= Baku =

Capital and largest city of Azerbaijan

Baku Bakı
- Capital city
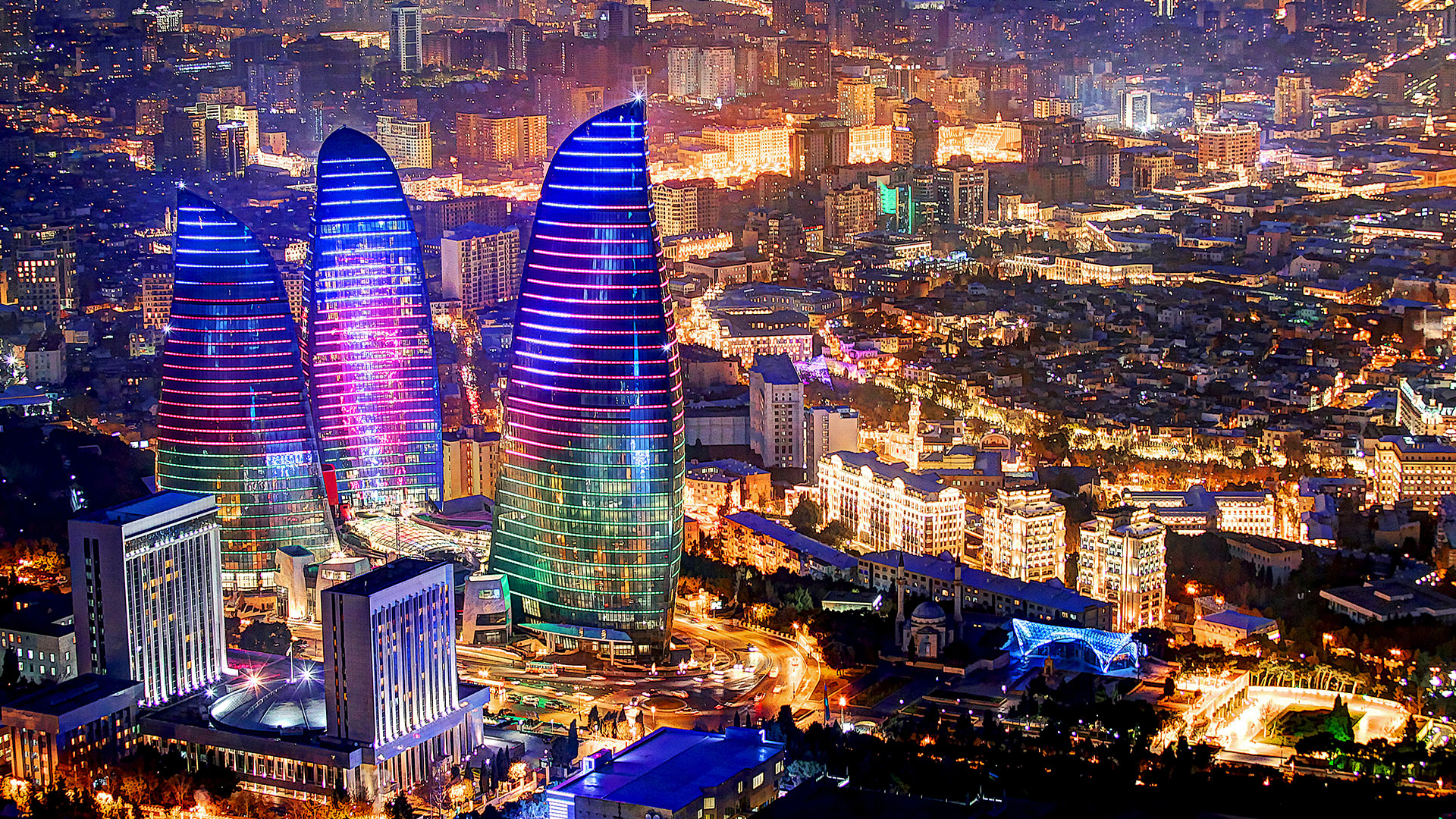
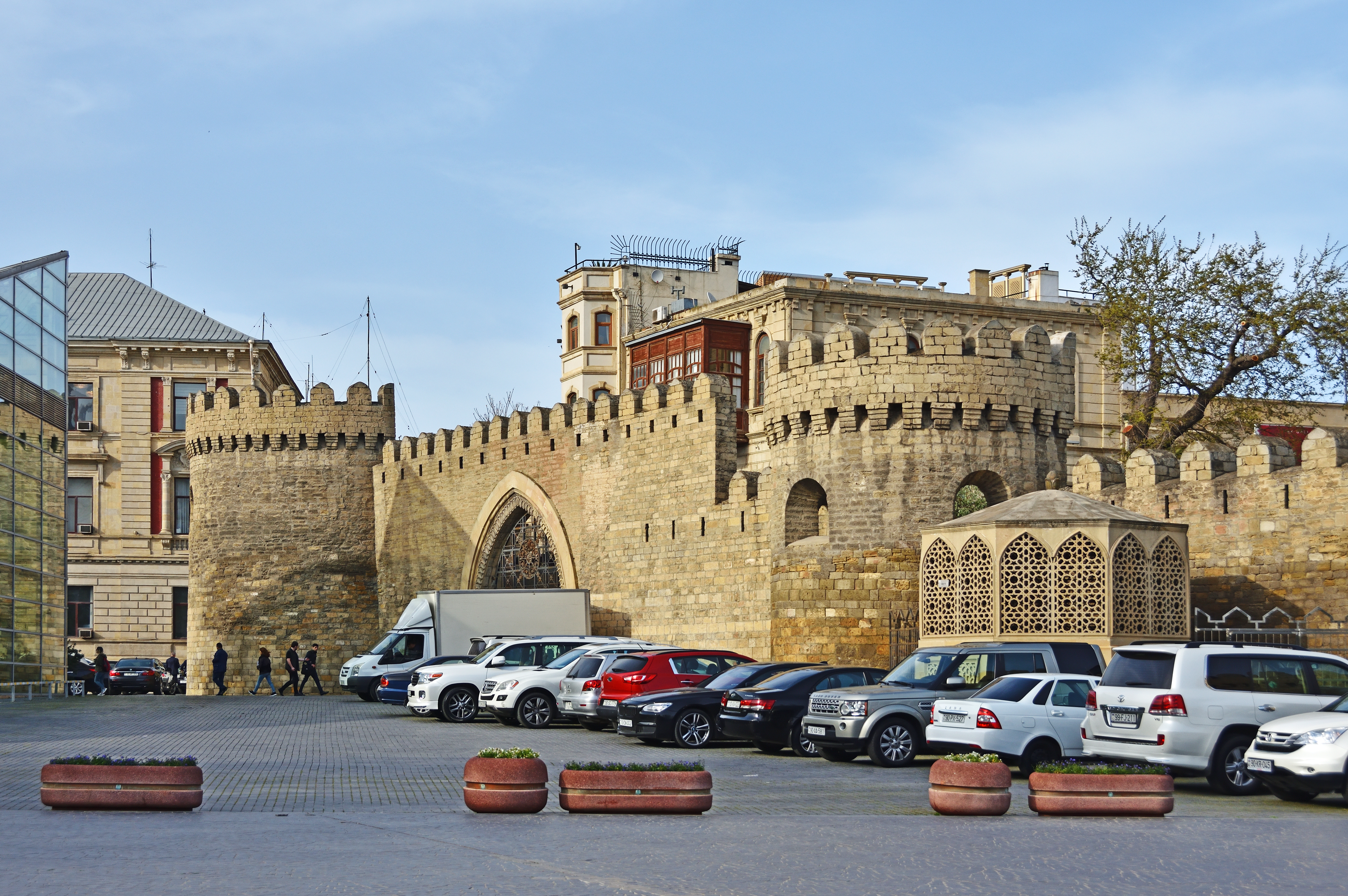
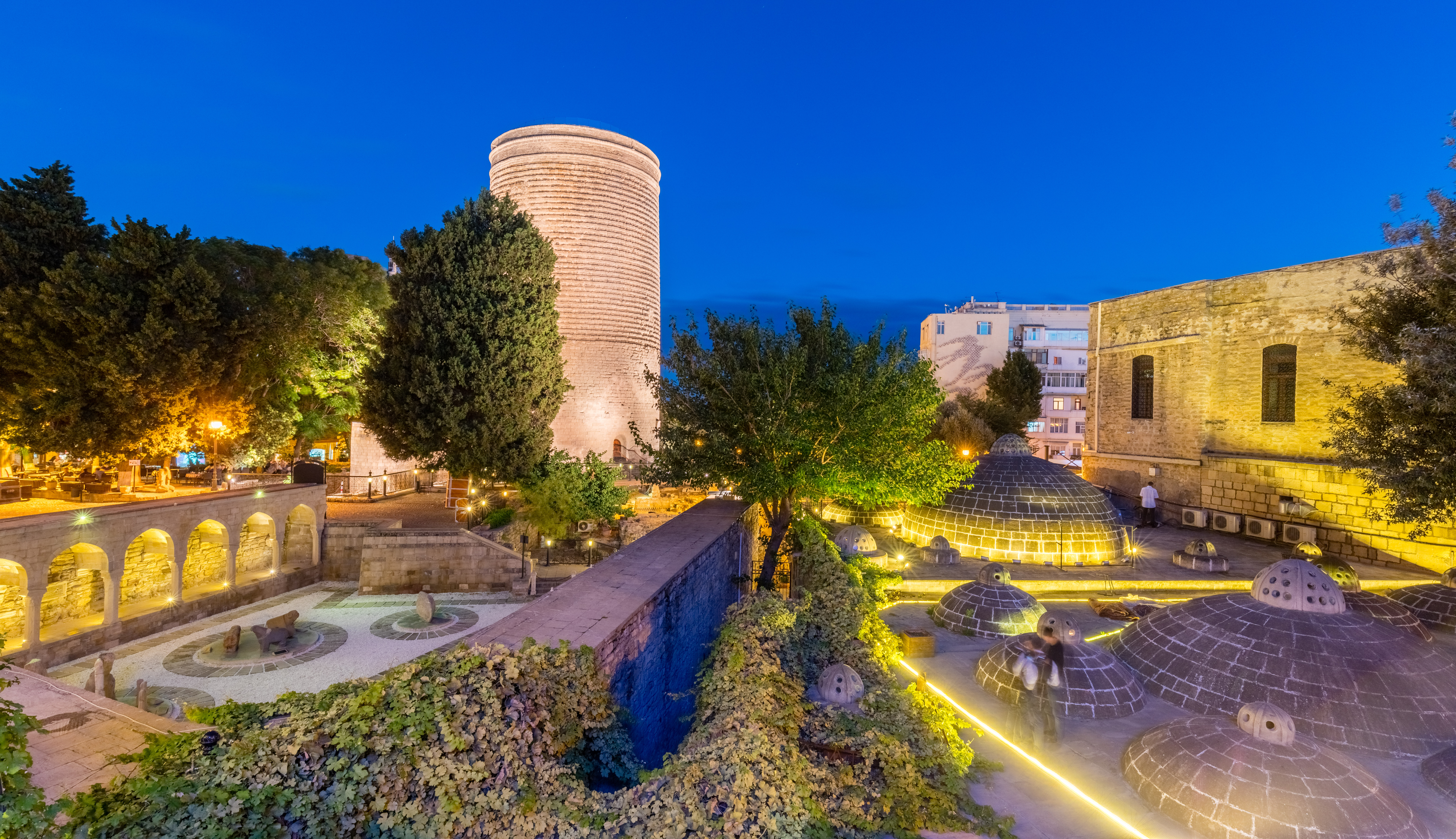
- Flame Towers city view Ismailiyya Palace Baku Fortress Wall Baku City Executive Power Palace of the Shirvanshahs Maiden Tower and the Old City of Baku

- Flag Coat of arms
- Nickname: City of Winds (Küləklər şəhəri)
- Location of Baku in Azerbaijan Location of Baku in Asia
- Coordinates: 40°22′32″N 49°49′57″E
- Country: Azerbaijan
- Region: BIR
- Districts (raion): 12 districts

Government
  - Mayor: Eldar Azizov

Area
  - Capital city: 2,140 km^{2} (830 sq mi)
- Elevation: −28 m (−92 ft)

Population (2024)
  - Capital city: 2,344,900
  - Rank: 1st
  - Density: 1,096/km^{2} (2,840/sq mi)
  - Metro: 3,725,000
- Demonym: Bakuvian (Bakılı)

GDP (nominal, 2023)
  - Capital city: AZN 91.2 billion (US$ 53.7 billion)
  - per capita: AZN 38,912 (US$ 22,890)
- Time zone: UTC+4 (AZT)
- Postal code: AZ1000
- Area code: +994 12
- ISO 3166 code: AZ-BA
- Vehicle registration: 10, 90, 99, 77, 88
- Website: www.baku-ih.gov.az

UNESCO World Heritage Site
- Official name: Walled City of Baku with the Shirvanshah's Palace and Maiden Tower
- Type: Cultural
- Criteria: iv
- Designated: 2000 (24th session)
- Reference no.: 958
- Endangered: 2003–2009
- Region: Asia, Europe

Baku (US: /bɑːˈkuː, ˈbɑːkuː/, UK: /bæˈkuː, ˈbækuː/; Azerbaijani: Bakı [bɑˈcɯ]) is the capital and largest city of Azerbaijan, as well as the largest city on the Caspian Sea and in the Caucasus region. Baku is 28 metres (92 ft) below sea level, which makes it the lowest lying national capital in the world and the largest city in the world below sea level. Baku lies on the southern shore of the Absheron Peninsula, along the Bay of Baku. Baku's urban population is estimated at over two million people. Baku is the primate city of Azerbaijan. It is the sole metropolis in the country, and about 25% of all inhabitants of the country live in Baku's metropolitan area.

Baku is divided into twelve administrative raions and 48 townships. Among these are the townships on the islands of the Baku Archipelago, as well as the industrial settlement of Neft Daşları built on oil rigs 60 kilometres (37 miles) away from Baku, in the Caspian Sea. The Old City, containing the Palace of the Shirvanshahs and the Maiden Tower, was designated as a UNESCO World Heritage Site in 2000.

The city is the scientific, cultural, and industrial centre of Azerbaijan. Many sizeable Azerbaijani institutions have their headquarters there. In the 2010s, Baku became a venue for major international events. It hosted the 57th Eurovision Song Contest in 2012, the 2015 European Games, the European Grand Prix in 2016, the 4th Islamic Solidarity Games in 2017, the Azerbaijan Grand Prix since 2017, the final of the 2018–19 UEFA Europa League, UEFA Euro 2020 and the 2024 United Nations Climate Change Conference. Baku joined the UNESCO Global Network of Learning Cities in 2020. The Baku International Sea Trade Port is capable of handling two million tonnes of general and dry bulk cargoes per year. Baku is renowned for its harsh winds, reflected in its nickname, the "City of Winds".

== Etymology ==
Baku gets its name from the word Baguan/Bagavan/Bagawan/Bhagawan which comes from the word Baga, which means "God" in Old Persian, and Bhaga in Sanskrit. It was called Bagavan during the Sassanian rule (22-651 CE). and later became known by its Perso-Arabic name باکو (Bākū). Early Arabic sources also refer to the city as Bākuh and Bākuya, all of which seem to come from a Persian name. The further etymology is unclear.

A popular etymology in the 19th century considered it to be derived from Persian بادکوبه (Bâd-kube, meaning "wind-pounded city", a compound of bād, "wind", and kube, which is rooted in the verb کوبیدن kubidan, "to pound", thus referring to a place where wind would be strong and pounding, as is the case of Baku, which is known to experience fierce winter snow storms and harsh winds). This popular name (Badkubə in modern Azerbaijani script) gained currency as a nickname for the city by the 19th century (e.g., it is used in Akinchi, volume 1, issue 1, p. 1), and is also reflected in the city's modern nickname as the "City of Winds" (Azerbaijani: Küləklər şəhəri). Another and even less probable folk etymology explains the name as deriving from Baghkuy, meaning "God's town". Baga (now بغ bagh) and kuy are the Old Persian words for "god" and "town" respectively; the name Baghkuy may be compared with Baghdād ("God-given") in which dād is the Old Persian word for "give".

During Soviet rule, the city was spelled in Cyrillic as "Бакы" in Azerbaijani (while the Russian spelling was and still is "Баку", Baku). The modern Azerbaijani spelling, which has been using the Latin alphabet since 1991, is Bakı; the shift from the Perso-Arabic letter و (ū) to Cyrillic "ы" and, later, Latin "ı" may be compared to that in other Azerbaijani words (e.g. compare قاپو qāpū in old Perso-Arabic spelling with modern Azerbaijani qapı, "door") or in suffixes, as و was often used to transcribe the vowel harmony in Azerbaijani (which was also the practice in Ottoman Turkish). (See also Azerbaijani alphabet.)

== History ==
=== Antiquity ===
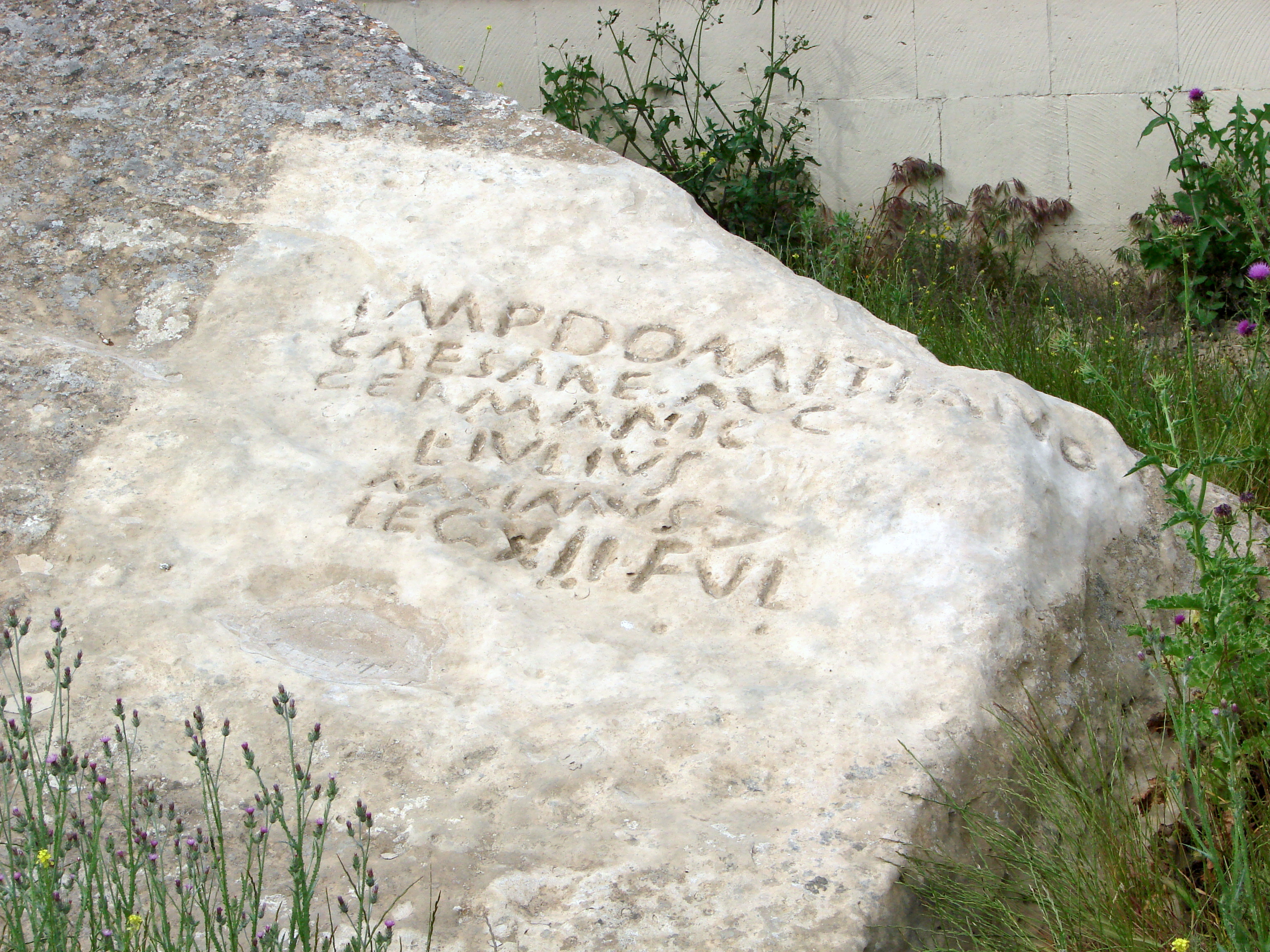
Roman stone inscription in Gobustan dating back to AD 84–96

Traces of human settlement in the region of present-day Baku date back to the Stone Age. Bronze Age rock carvings have been discovered near Bayil, and a bronze figure of a small fish in the territory of the Old City. These have led some to suggest the existence of a Bronze-Age settlement within the city's territory. Near Nardaran, a place called Umid Gaya features a prehistoric observatory, where images of the sun and of various constellations are carved into rock together with a primitive astronomic table. Further archeological excavations have revealed various prehistoric settlements, native temples, statues and other artifacts within the territory of the modern city and around it.

In the 1st century AD, the Romans organised two Caucasian campaigns and reached what is today Baku. Near the city, in what is today Gobustan, Roman inscriptions dating from AD 84 to 96 survive – some of the earliest written evidences for a city there.

According to the 6th-century archbishop and historian St. Sophronius of Cyprus, in 71, St. Bartholomew the Apostle was preaching Christianity in the city of Albana or Albanopolis, with majority academic consensus associating it with Greater Armenia, although some associate it with either present-day Baku or Derbent, both located by the Caspian Sea. St. Bartholomew managed to convert even members of the local royal family who had worshipped the idol Astaroth, but was later martyred by being flayed alive and crucified head down on orders from the pagan king Astyages. The remains of St. Bartholomew were secretly transferred to Mesopotamia.

=== Rise of the Shirvanshahs and the Safavid era ===
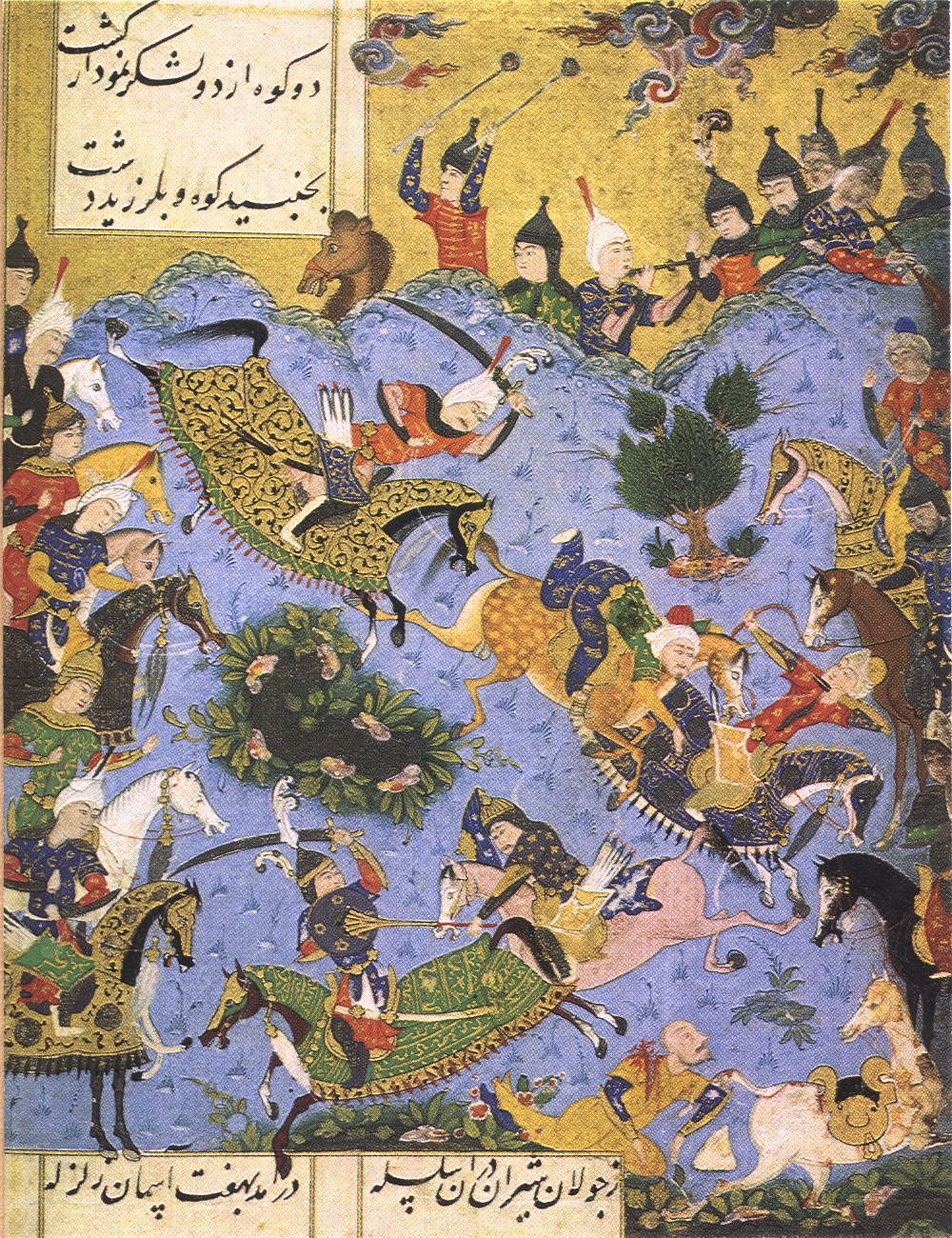
A miniature painting marking the downfall of the Shirvanshahs at the hands of the Safavids

Baku was the realm of the Shirvanshahs during the 8th century AD. The city frequently came under assault from the Khazars and (starting from the 10th century) from the Rus'. Akhsitan I built a navy in Baku and successfully repelled a Rus' assault in 1170. After a devastating earthquake struck Shamakhi, the capital of Shirvan, Shirvanshah's court moved to Baku in 1191.

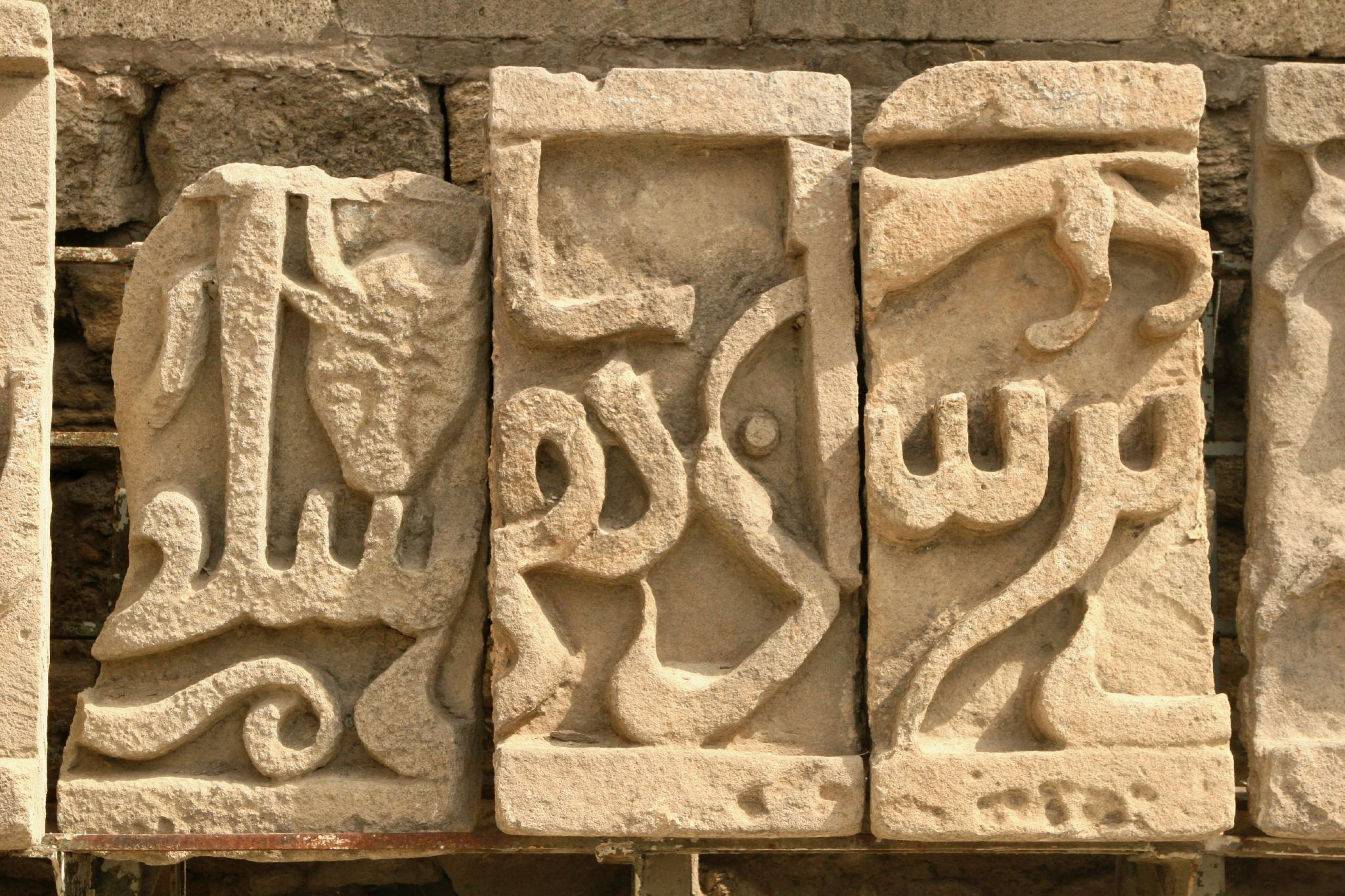
Relics from the sunken Sabayil Castle

The Shirvan era greatly influenced Baku and the remainder of present-day Azerbaijan. Between the 12th and 14th centuries, massive fortifications were built in Baku and the surrounding towns. The Maiden Tower, the Ramana Tower, the Nardaran Fortress, the Shagan Castle, the Mardakan Castle, the Round Castle and also the Sabayil Castle on the island of the Bay of Baku date from this period. The city walls of Baku were also rebuilt and strengthened.

By the early 16th century, Baku's wealth and strategic position attracted the attention of its larger neighbours; in the previous two centuries, it was under the rule of the Iran-centred Kara Koyunlu and Ak Koyunlu. The fall of the Ak Koyunlu brought the city immediately into the sphere of the newly formed Iranian Safavid dynasty, led by king (shah) Ismail I (r. 1501–1524). Ismail I laid siege to Baku in 1501 and captured it; he allowed the Shirvanshahs to remain in power, under Safavid suzerainty. His successor, king Tahmasp I (r. 1524–1576), completely removed the Shirvanshahs from power and made Baku a part of the Shirvan province. Baku remained as an integral part of his empire and of successive Iranian dynasties for the next centuries, until ceded to the Russian Empire through the 1813 Treaty of Gulistan. The House of Shirvan, which had ruled Baku since the 9th century, was extinguished in the course of Safavid rule.

At this time, the city was enclosed within lines of strong walls, which were washed by the sea on one side and protected by a wide trench on land. The Ottomans briefly gained control over Baku as a result of the Ottoman-Safavid War of 1578–1590; by 1607, it came under Iranian control again. In 1604 Shah Abbas I (r. 1588–1629) destroyed Baku fortress.

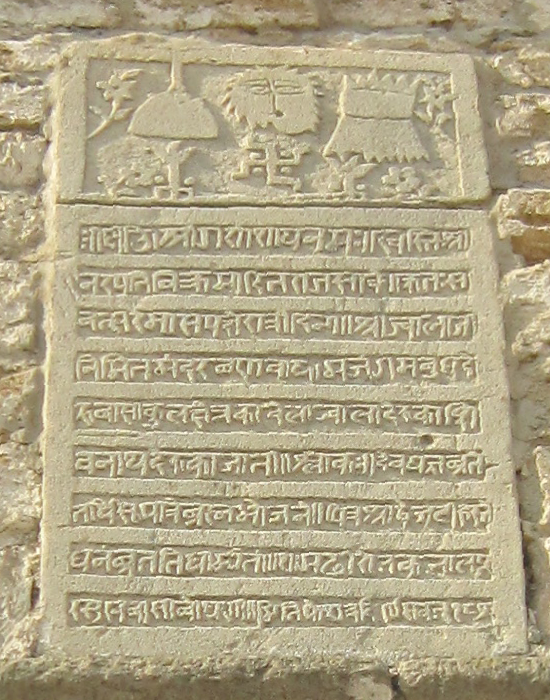
Atashgah is a temple built by Indian traders before 1745, west of the Caspian Sea. The inscription invokes Lord Shiva in Sanskrit at the Atashgah.

Baku had a reputation as a focal point for traders from across the world during the Early modern period; commerce was active and the area prospered. Notably, traders from the Indian subcontinent established themselves in the region. These Indian traders built the Ateshgah of Baku during 17th–18th centuries; the temple was used as a Hindu, Sikh, and Zoroastrian place of worship.

=== Downfall of the Safavids and the Khanate of Baku ===
The Safavids temporarily lost power in Iran in 1722; Emperor Peter the Great of Russia took advantage of the situation and invaded. As a result of the Russo-Persian War of 1722–1723, the Safavids were forced to cede Baku to Russia. By 1730 the situation had deteriorated for the Russians; the successes of Nader Shah (r. 1736–1747) led them to sign the Treaty of Ganja near Ganja on 10 March 1735, ceding the city and all other conquered territories in the Caucasus back to Iran.

The eruption of instability following Nader Shah's death in 1747 gave rise to the various Caucasian khanates.

=== Russo-Persian Wars and Iran's cession ===
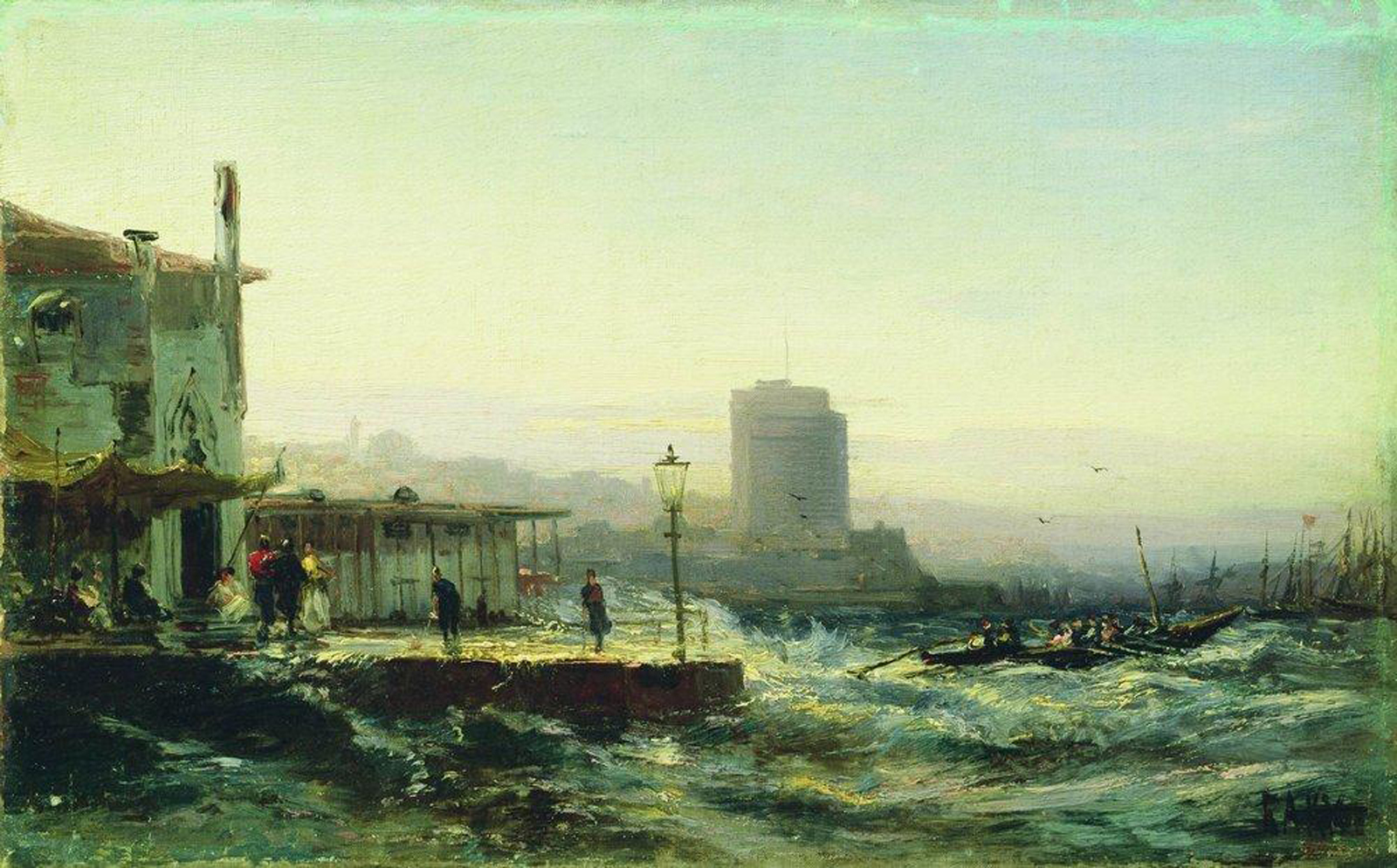
Painting of Baku's shoreline in 1861 by Alexey Bogolyubov

From the late 18th century, Imperial Russia switched to a more aggressive geopolitical stance towards its two neighbours and rivals to the south, namely Iran and the Ottoman Empire. In the spring of 1796, by Catherine the Great's order, General Valerian Zubov's troops started a large campaign against Qajar Persia. Zubov had sent 13,000 men to capture Baku, and it was overrun subsequently without any resistance. On 13 June 1796, a Russian flotilla entered Baku Bay, and a garrison of Russian troops was stationed inside the city. Later, however, Emperor Paul I of Russia ordered the cessation of the campaign and the withdrawal of Russian forces following Catherine's death. In March 1797 the tsarist troops left Baku, and the city became part of Qajar Iran again.

In 1813, following the Russo-Persian War of 1804–1813, Qajar Iran had to sign the Treaty of Gulistan with Russia. This provided for the cession of Baku and of most of Iran's territories in the North Caucasus and South Caucasus to Russia. During the next and final bout of hostilities between the two, the Russo-Persian War of 1826–1828, the Iranians briefly recaptured Baku. However, the militarily superior Russians ended this war with a victory as well, and the resulting Treaty of Turkmenchay (1828) made Baku's inclusion in the Russian Empire definite. When Baku was occupied by the Russian troops during the war of 1804–13, nearly the entire population of some 8,000 people was ethnic Tat. In 1809, more than 95% of the population consisted of Azerbaijani Turks. By 1860, this proportion had slightly decreased to 94.4%. The city also included small minority communities. Baku within Russia was the administrative center of the Baku Uyezd, Baku Governorate, and the Baku Gradonachalstvo.

After the capture of Baku, the Baku Khanate was abolished, and the city was governed under a military command system in the early years. In 1812, a city court was established where local customs and Russian law were applied together. With the transition to civilian administration in 1840, Baku became a district center attached to the Caspian Province. Following the devastating earthquake in Shamakhi in 1859, the city gained the status of a provincial capital and emerged as one of the major administrative and political centers of the Caucasus.

The social structure consisted of privileged groups such as beys and Islamic religious figures, as well as merchants, craftsmen, and a wage-earning working class that developed in connection with port activities. The city was divided into two main areas: the Inner City (Icherisheher) within the walls and the Forstadt outside the walls. In the second half of the nineteenth century, steps toward modernization were taken in the fields of infrastructure, education, and healthcare.

=== Discovery of oil ===
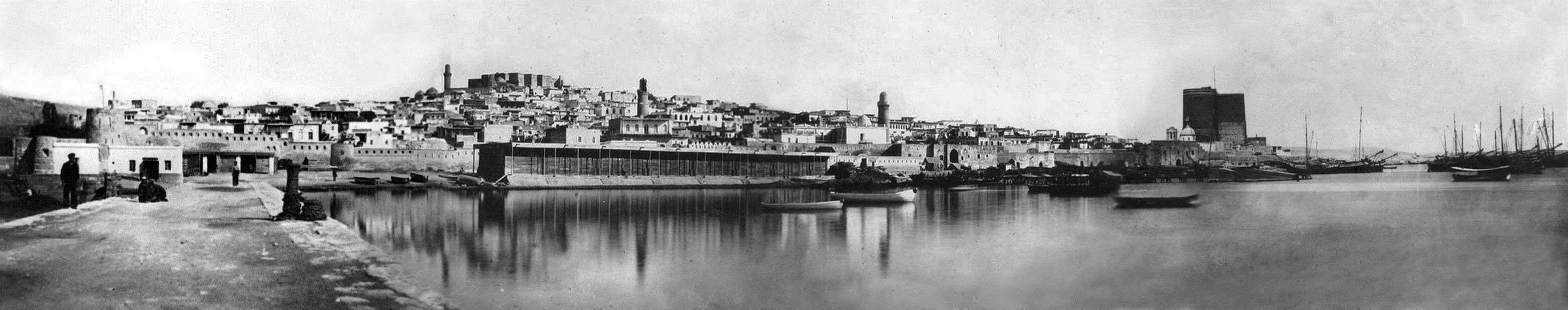
Panoramic view of Baku bay in 1861

The Russians built the first oil-distilling factory in Balaxani in 1837. The first person to drill oil in Baku was an ethnic Armenian Ivan Mirzoev, who is also known as a 'founding father of Baku's oil industry.' Drilling for oil began in the 1840s, with the first oil well drilled in the Bibi-Heybat suburb of Baku in 1846. Large-scale oil exploration started in 1872 when the Russian imperial authorities auctioned parcels of oil-rich land around Baku to private investors. The pioneer of oil extracting from the bottom of the sea was the Polish geologist Witold Zglenicki. Soon after, investors appeared in Baku, including the Nobel Brothers in 1873 as well as Alphonse James de Rothschild (Bnito) in 1883. An industrial area of oil refineries, better known as Black Town (Russian: Чёрный город), developed near Baku by the early 1880s.

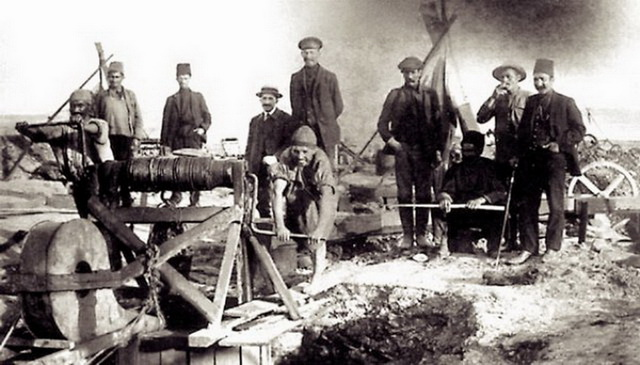
Oil workers digging an oil well by hand at Bibi-Heybat

Professor A. V. Williams Jackson of Columbia University wrote in his work From Constantinople to the Home of Omar Khayyam (1911):

Baku is a city founded upon oil, for to its inexhaustible founts of naphtha it owes its very existence, its maintenance, its prosperity... At present Baku produces one-fifth of the oil that is used in the world, and the immense output in crude petroleum from this single city far surpasses that in any other district where oil is found. Verily, the words of the Scriptures find illustration here: 'the rock poured me out rivers of oil. Oil is in the air one breathes, in one's nostrils, in one's eyes, in the water of the morning bath (though not in the drinking water, for that is brought in bottles from distant mineral springs), in one's starched linen – everywhere. This is the impression one carries away from Baku, and it is certainly true in the environs.

By the beginning of the 20th century, half of the oil sold in international markets was extracted in Baku. The oil boom contributed to the massive growth of Baku. Between 1856 and 1910 Baku's population grew at a faster rate than that of London, Paris, New York City, or Tokyo.

=== World War I ===
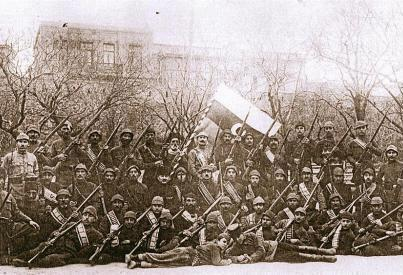
Soldiers and officers of the army of the Azerbaijan Democratic Republic shortly after the Battle of Baku

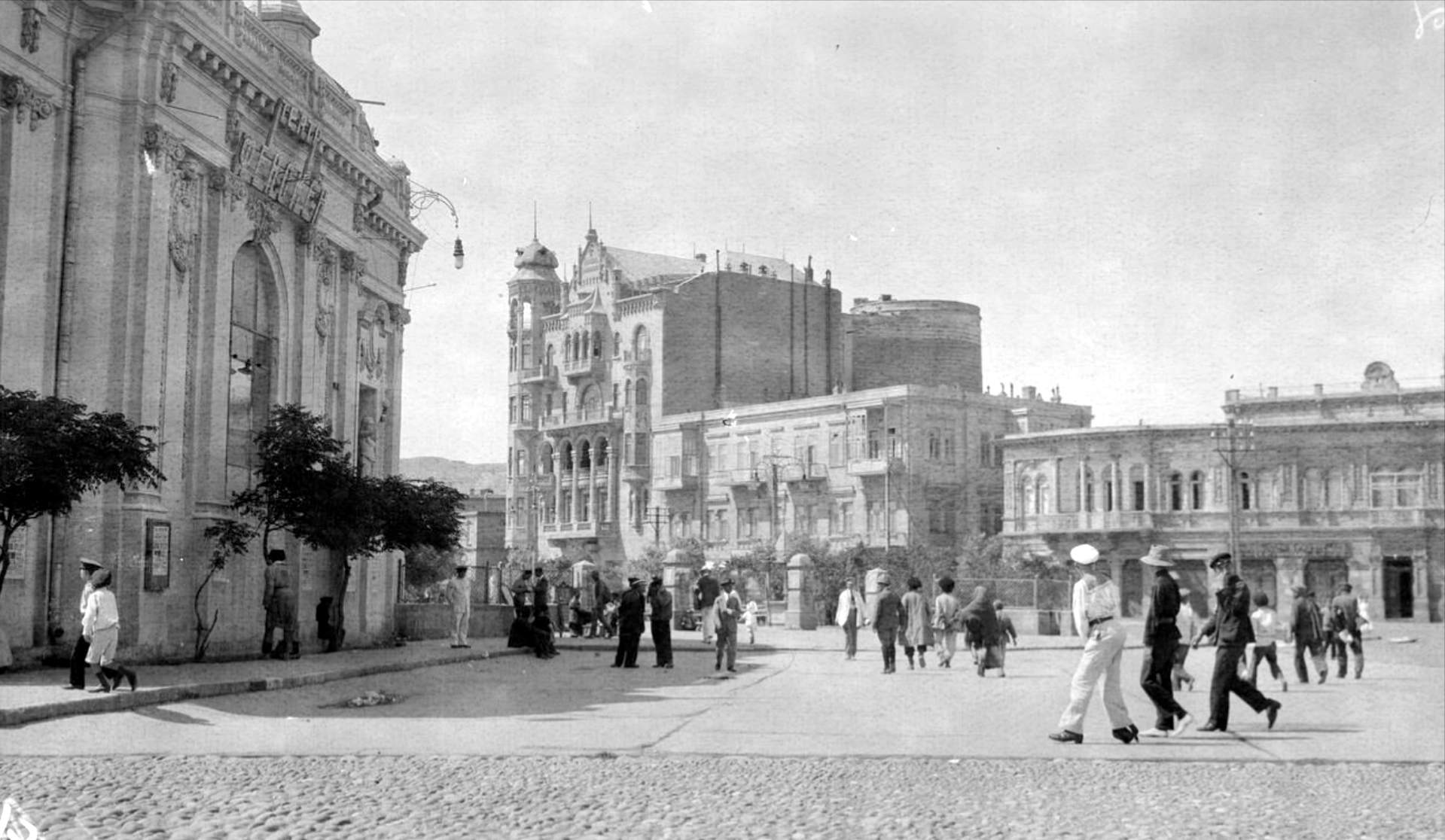
Neftchiler Avenue in Baku, c. 1920

In 1917, after the October Revolution and amidst the turmoil of World War I and the Russian Revolution, Baku came under the control of the Baku Commune, led by the veteran Bolshevik Stepan Shahumyan. Seeking to capitalize on the existing ethnic conflicts, by spring 1918, Bolsheviks inspired and condoned civil war in and around Baku. During the March Days of 1918, Bolsheviks and Dashnaks, seeking to establish control over Baku streets, faced armed Azerbaijani groups. The Azerbaijanis suffered defeat from the united forces of the Baku Soviet and were massacred by Dashnak teams in what was called the March Days. An estimated 3,000–12,000 Azerbaijanis were killed in their own capital. After the massacre, on 28 May 1918, the Azerbaijani faction of the Transcaucasian Sejm proclaimed the independence of the Azerbaijan Democratic Republic (ADR) in Ganja, thereby founding the first Muslim-majority democratic and secular republic. The newly independent Azerbaijani republic, being unable to defend the independence of the country on their own, asked the Ottoman Empire for military support in accordance with clause 4 of the treaty between the two countries. Shortly after, Azerbaijani forces, with support of the Ottoman Army of Islam led by Nuru Pasha, started their advance on Baku, eventually capturing the city from the loose coalition of Bolsheviks, SRs, Dashnaks, Mensheviks and British forces under the command of General Lionel Dunsterville on 15 September 1918.

After the Battle of Baku of August–September 1918, the Azerbaijani irregular troops, with the tacit support of the Turkish command, conducted four days of pillaging and killing 10,000–30,000 Armenians of Baku. This pogrom became known as the "September Days". Shortly after this, Baku was proclaimed the new capital of the Azerbaijan Democratic Republic.

The Ottoman Empire, recognising defeat in World War I by October 1918, signed the Armistice of Mudros with the British (30 October 1918); this meant the evacuation of Turkish forces from Baku. Headed by General William Thomson, some 5,000 British troops, including parts of the former Dunsterforce, arrived in Baku on 17 November. Thomson declared himself military governor of Baku and implemented martial law in the city until "the civil power would be strong enough to release the forces from the responsibility to maintain the public order". British forces left before the end of 1919.

=== Soviet period ===
The independence of the Azerbaijani republic was short-lived. On 28 April 1920, the 11th Red Army invaded Baku and reinstalled the Bolsheviks, making Baku the capital of the Azerbaijan Soviet Socialist Republic within the Soviet Union.

Baku was the major oil city of the Soviet Union. From 1922 to 1930 Baku became the venue for one of the major trade fairs of the Soviet Union, serving as a commercial bridgehead to Iran and the Middle East.

=== World War II ===
The major powers continued to note Baku's growing importance as a major energy hub. During World War II (1939–1945) and particularly during the 1942 Nazi German invasion of the southwestern Soviet Union, Baku became of vital strategic importance to the Axis powers. In fact, capturing the oil fields of Baku was a primary goal of the Wehrmacht's Operation Edelweiss, carried out between May and November 1942. However, the German Army reached only a point some 530 kilometres (329 miles) northwest of Baku in November 1942, falling far short of the city's capture before being driven back during the Soviet Operation Little Saturn in mid-December 1942.

=== Fall of the Soviet Union and later ===
After the 1991 dissolution of the Soviet Union, Baku embarked on a process of restructuring on a scale unseen in its history. Thousands of panel buildings from the Soviet period were demolished to make way for a green belt on its shores; parks and gardens were built on the land reclaimed by filling up the beaches of the Baku Bay. Improvements were made in general cleaning, maintenance, and garbage collection to bring these services up to Western European standards. The city is growing dynamically and developing at pace on an east–west axis along the shores of the Caspian Sea. Sustainability has become a key factor in future urban development.

== Geography ==
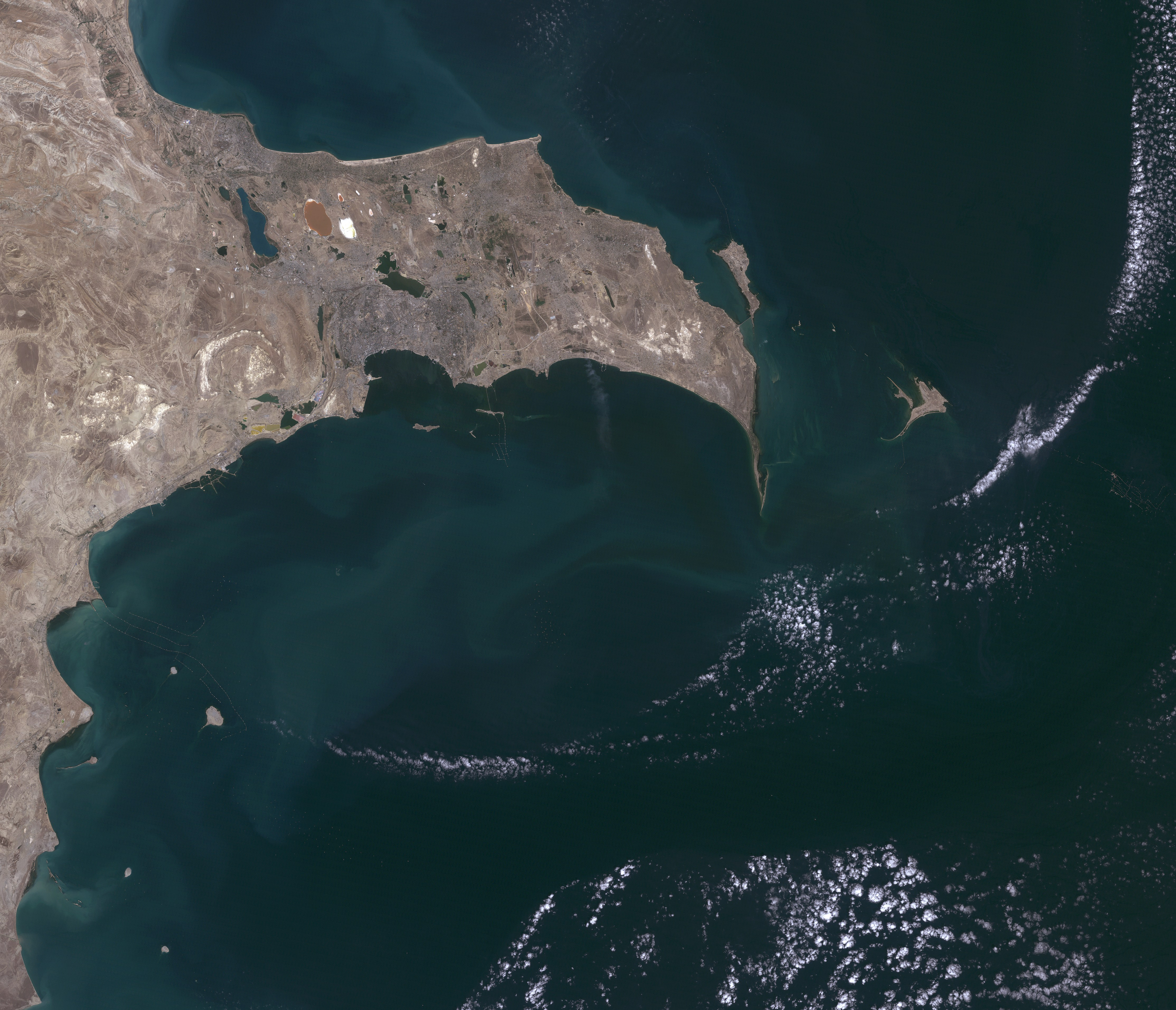
Satellite image of the Absheron peninsula, Landsat 5, 6 September 2010

Baku is situated on the western coast of the Caspian Sea. In the vicinity of the city there are a number of mud volcanoes (Keyraki, Bogkh-bogkha, Lokbatan and others) and salt lakes (Boyukshor, Khodasan, etc.).

=== Climate ===
Baku has a cold semi-arid climate (Köppen climate classification: BSk) with hot and humid summers, cool and occasionally wet winters, and strong winds all year long. However, unlike many other cities with such climate features, Baku does not see extremely hot summers and substantial sunshine hours. This is largely because of its northerly latitude and the fact that it is located on a peninsula on the shore of the Caspian Sea.

Baku, and the Absheron Peninsula on which it is situated, is the most arid part of Azerbaijan (precipitation here is around or less than 200 mm (8 in) a year). This is largely due to the rain shadow effect from the Caucasus Mountains, with corresponding latitudes on the Black Sea on average receiving 2,300 mm (91 in) or more. The majority of the light annual precipitation occurs in seasons other than summer, but none of these seasons is particularly wet.

Baku was a popular vacation destination in the Soviet times. The city's past as a Soviet industrial centre left it one of the most polluted cities in the world, as of 2008.

At the same time, Baku is noted as a very windy city throughout the year, hence the city's nickname the "City of Winds", and gale-force winds, the cold northern wind khazri and the warm southern wind gilavar are typical here in all seasons. Indeed, the city is renowned for its fierce winter snow storms and harsh winds. The speed of the khazri sometimes reaches 144 km/h (89 mph), which can cause damage to crops, trees and roof tiles.

The daily mean temperature in July and August averages 26.4 °C (79.5 °F), and there is very little rainfall during that season. During summer, the khazri sweeps through, bringing desired coolness. Winter is cool and occasionally wet, with the daily mean temperature in January and February averaging 4.3 °C (39.7 °F). During winter, the khazri sweeps through, driven by polar air masses; temperatures on the coast frequently drop below freezing and make it feel bitterly cold. Winter snow storms are occasional; snow usually melts within a few days after each snowfall.

Climate data for Baku (Maştağa) (1991–2020 normals, extremes 1987–present)
Month	Jan	Feb	Mar	Apr	May	Jun	Jul	Aug	Sep	Oct	Nov	Dec	Year
Record high °C (°F)	20.4 (68.7)	24.0 (75.2)	27.8 (82.0)	27.8 (82.0)	35.0 (95.0)	40.5 (104.9)	42.7 (108.9)	41.9 (107.4)	39.4 (102.9)	30.1 (86.2)	25.0 (77.0)	26.0 (78.8)	42.7 (108.9)
Mean daily maximum °C (°F)	7.3 (45.1)	7.6 (45.7)	10.9 (51.6)	16.8 (62.2)	23.4 (74.1)	28.0 (82.4)	30.5 (86.9)	30.6 (87.1)	25.8 (78.4)	19.5 (67.1)	13.4 (56.1)	9.4 (48.9)	18.6 (65.5)
Daily mean °C (°F)	4.8 (40.6)	4.7 (40.5)	7.3 (45.1)	11.9 (53.4)	18.0 (64.4)	23.2 (73.8)	26.1 (79.0)	26.5 (79.7)	22.0 (71.6)	16.7 (62.1)	10.9 (51.6)	6.6 (43.9)	14.9 (58.8)
Mean daily minimum °C (°F)	2.9 (37.2)	2.7 (36.9)	4.6 (40.3)	8.9 (48.0)	14.6 (58.3)	19.7 (67.5)	22.9 (73.2)	22.5 (72.5)	18.7 (65.7)	13.2 (55.8)	8.4 (47.1)	4.7 (40.5)	12.0 (53.6)
Record low °C (°F)	−13.7 (7.3)	−8.4 (16.9)	−7.0 (19.4)	−6.1 (21.0)	0.2 (32.4)	10.0 (50.0)	11.2 (52.2)	11.9 (53.4)	9.1 (48.4)	1.2 (34.2)	−2.8 (27.0)	−5.5 (22.1)	−13.7 (7.3)
Average precipitation mm (inches)	32.4 (1.28)	30.3 (1.19)	18.4 (0.72)	16.6 (0.65)	15.1 (0.59)	9.3 (0.37)	3.9 (0.15)	8.2 (0.32)	28.5 (1.12)	32.5 (1.28)	44.3 (1.74)	34.6 (1.36)	274.1 (10.77)
Average precipitation days (≥ 1.0 mm)	6	6	5	4	3	2	1	2	2	6	6	6	49
Average snowy days	4	3	0	0	0	0	0	0	0	0	0	3	10
Average relative humidity (%)	79.2	81.1	83.8	83.9	83.4	78.0	75.3	72.9	72.8	76.1	77.5	78.7	78.6
Mean monthly sunshine hours	79.3	74.8	116.5	194.6	281.1	300.4	311.6	283.6	214.5	144.6	92.3	93.5	2,186.8
Average ultraviolet index	1	2	4	6	8	9	9	8	6	3	1	1	5
Source 1: NOAA (precipitation days and sun 1971–1990) Starlings Roost Weather
Source 2: Meoweather (Snowy days) infoclimat.fr (extremes), Weather.Directory

== Administrative divisions ==
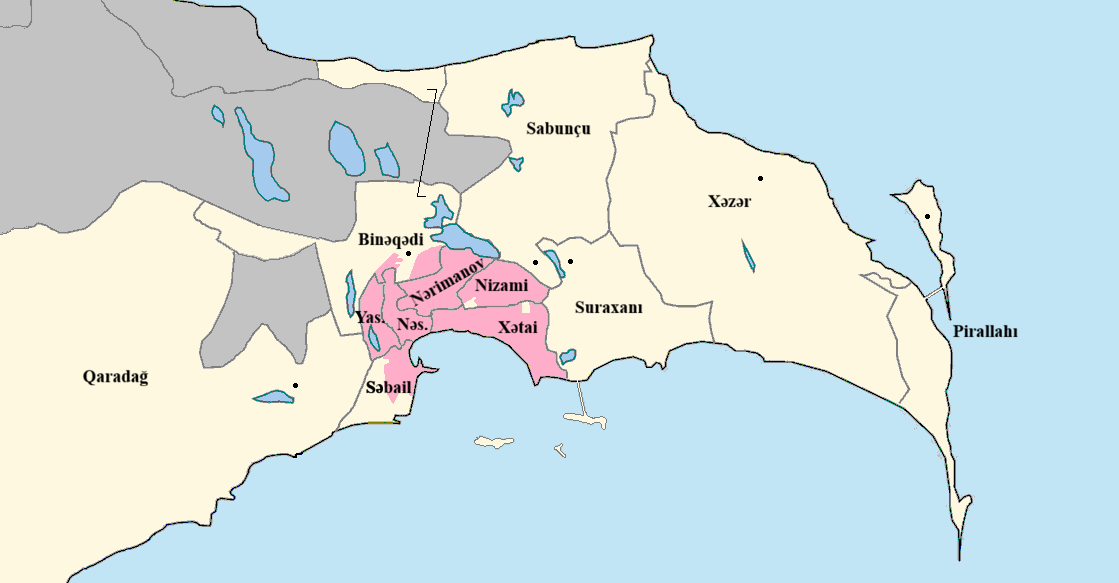
Map of the districts of Baku

Baku is divided into 12 rayonlar (sub-rayons) (administrative districts).

- Binagadi (Binəqədi) raion
- Garadagh (Qaradağ) raion
- Khatai (Xətai) raion
- Khazar (Xəzər) raion
- Narimanov (Nərimanov) raion
- Nasimi (Nəsimi) raion
- Nizami raion
- Pirallahi (Pirallahı) raion
- Sabail (Səbail) raion
- Sabunchu (Sabunçu) raion
- Surakhani (Suraxanı) raion
- Yasamal raion

== Demographics ==
Until 1988, Baku had large Russian, Armenian, and Jewish populations. With the onset of the First Nagorno-Karabakh War and the pogrom against Armenians starting in January 1990, the city's large Armenian population was expelled. After the collapse of the Soviet Union, Azerbaijani President Heydar Aliyev returned several synagogues and a Jewish college, nationalised by the Soviets, to the Jewish community, and encouraged the restoration of these buildings. Seven of the original 11 synagogues, including the Gilah synagogue, built in 1896, and the large Kruei Synagogue, were renovated.

Year	Tatars (Note: Later known as Azerbaijanis.)		Russians		Armenians		Jews		Others		TOTAL
Year	Number	%	Number	%	Number	%	Number	%	Number	%	TOTAL
1851	5,000+	67.3			405	5.5					7,431
1886	37,530	43.3	21,390	24.7	24,490	28.3	391	0.5	2,810	3.2	86,611
1897	40,341	36.0	37,399	33.4	19,099	17.1	3,369	3.0	11,696	10.5	111,904
1903	44,257	28.4	59,955	38.5	26,151	16.8			28,513	18.3	155,876
1913	45,962	21.4	76,288	35.5	41,680	19.4	9,690	4.5	41,052	19.1	214,672
1916	69,366 (Note: This is the number of Shia Muslims within the Baku Gradonachalstvo.)	26.4	79,702	30.4	62,357	23.8	6,412	2.4	44,585	17.0	262,422

Year	Turks (Note: Later known as Azerbaijanis.)		Russians		Armenians		Jews		Others		TOTAL
Year	Number	%	Number	%	Number	%	Number	%	Number	%	TOTAL
1917 (Note: Described as a "rough" census organised in October 1917.)	67,190	28.2	77,123	32.4	52,184	21.9	12,427	5.2	29,244 (Note: 11,904 or 5.0% were Persians.)	12.3	238,168
1926	118,737	26.2	167,373	36.9	76,656	16.9	19,589	4.3	70,978	15.7	453,333

Year	Azerbaijanis		Russians		Armenians		Jews		Others		TOTAL
Year	Number	%	Number	%	Number	%	Number	%	Number	%	TOTAL
1939	215,482	27.4	343,064	43.6	118,650	15.1	31,050	3.9	79,377	10.1	787,623
1959	211,372	32.9	223,242	34.7	137,111	21.3	24,057	3.7	56,725	8.7	652,507
1970	586,052	46.3	351,090	27.7	207,464	16.4	29,716	2.3	88,193	6.9	1,262,515
1979	530,556	52.4	229,873	22.7	167,226	16.5	22,916	2.3	62,865	6.2	1,013,436
January 1990: Baku pogrom. Massacre and expulsion of Armenian population
1999	1,574,252	88.0	119,371	6.7	378	0.0	5,164	0.3	89,689	5.0	1,788,854
2009	1,848,107	90.3	108,525	5.3	104	0.0	6,056	0.3	83,023	4.1	2,045,815
2019	2,208,486	94.8	65,418	2.8	74	0.0	2,277	0.1	54,170	2.3	2,330,425

=== Ethnic groups ===
The Armenian Saint Gregory the Illuminator's Church, Baku

Today, the vast majority of Baku's population is made up of ethnic Azerbaijanis, and the rest are Talysh, Russians, Lezgi and others. The intensive growth of the population started in the middle of the 19th century when Baku was a small town with a population of about 7,000 people. The population increased again from about 13,000 in the 1860s to 112,000 in 1897 and 215,000 in 1913, making Baku the largest city in the Caucasus region.

Several times during its history, Azerbaijanis were not a majority ethnic group in Baku. From the 1970s, ethnic Azerbaijanis became a majority group in the city. In 2003 Baku had 153,400 internally displaced persons and 93,400 refugees.

=== Religion ===
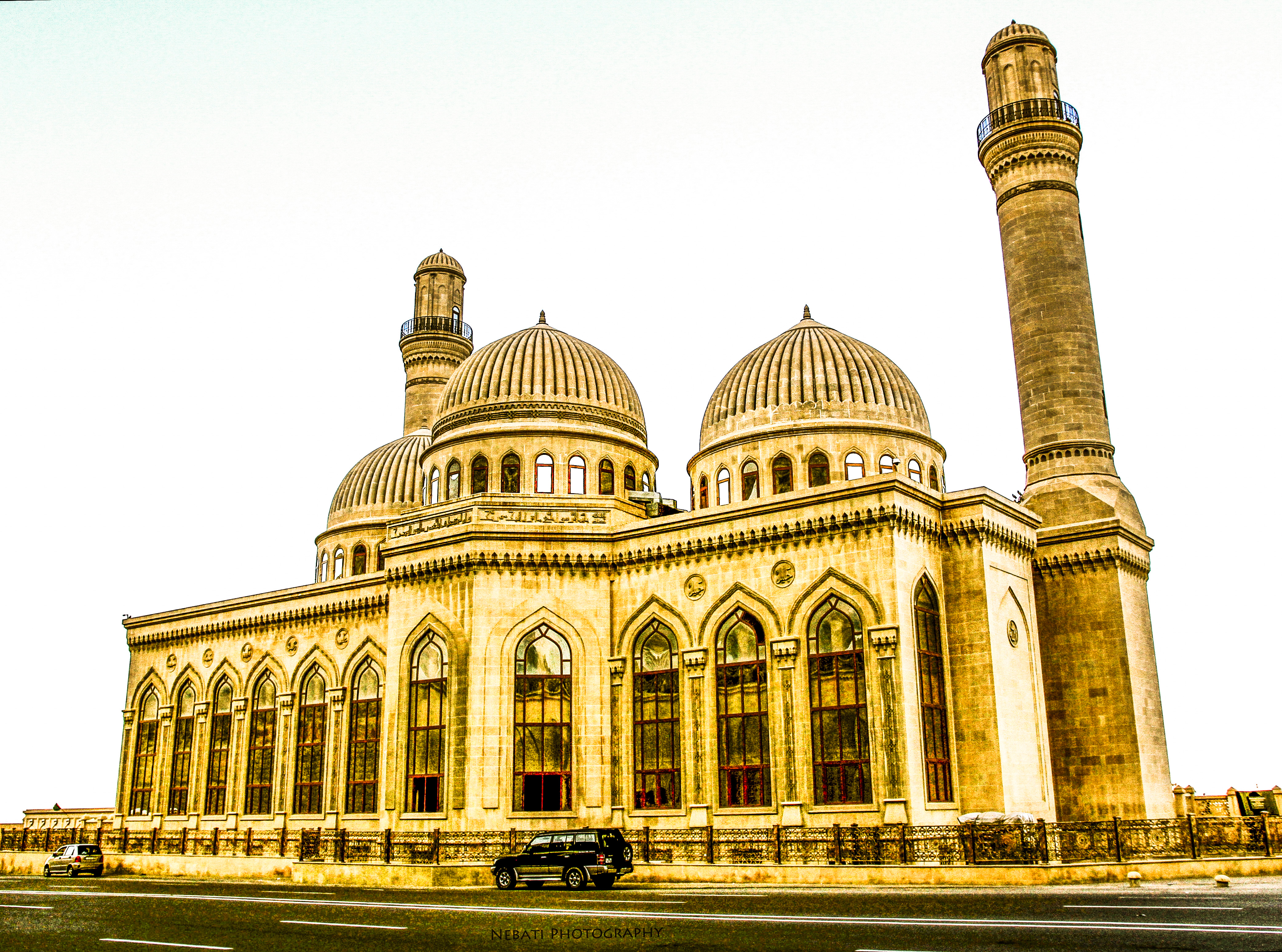
The 13th-century Bibi-Heybat Mosque was built over the tomb of a descendant of the Islamic prophet Muhammad.

The largest religious community in Baku are Shia Muslims. The city's notable mosques include Juma Mosque, Bibi-Heybat Mosque, Muhammad Mosque and Taza Pir Mosque.

By article 48 of its Constitution, Azerbaijan is a secular state and ensures religious freedom. Religious minorities in the city include Russian Orthodox Christians, Catholic Levantines, Georgian Orthodox Christians, Albanian-Udi Apostolic Christians, Lutherans, Jews, Molokans, and Sufi Muslims. Baku is the seat of the Catholic Apostolic Prefecture of Azerbaijan.

Zoroastrianism, although extinct in the city as well as in the rest of the country by the present time, had a long history in Azerbaijan and the Zoroastrian New Year (Nowruz) continues to be the main holiday in the city as well as in the rest of Azerbaijan.

== Economy ==
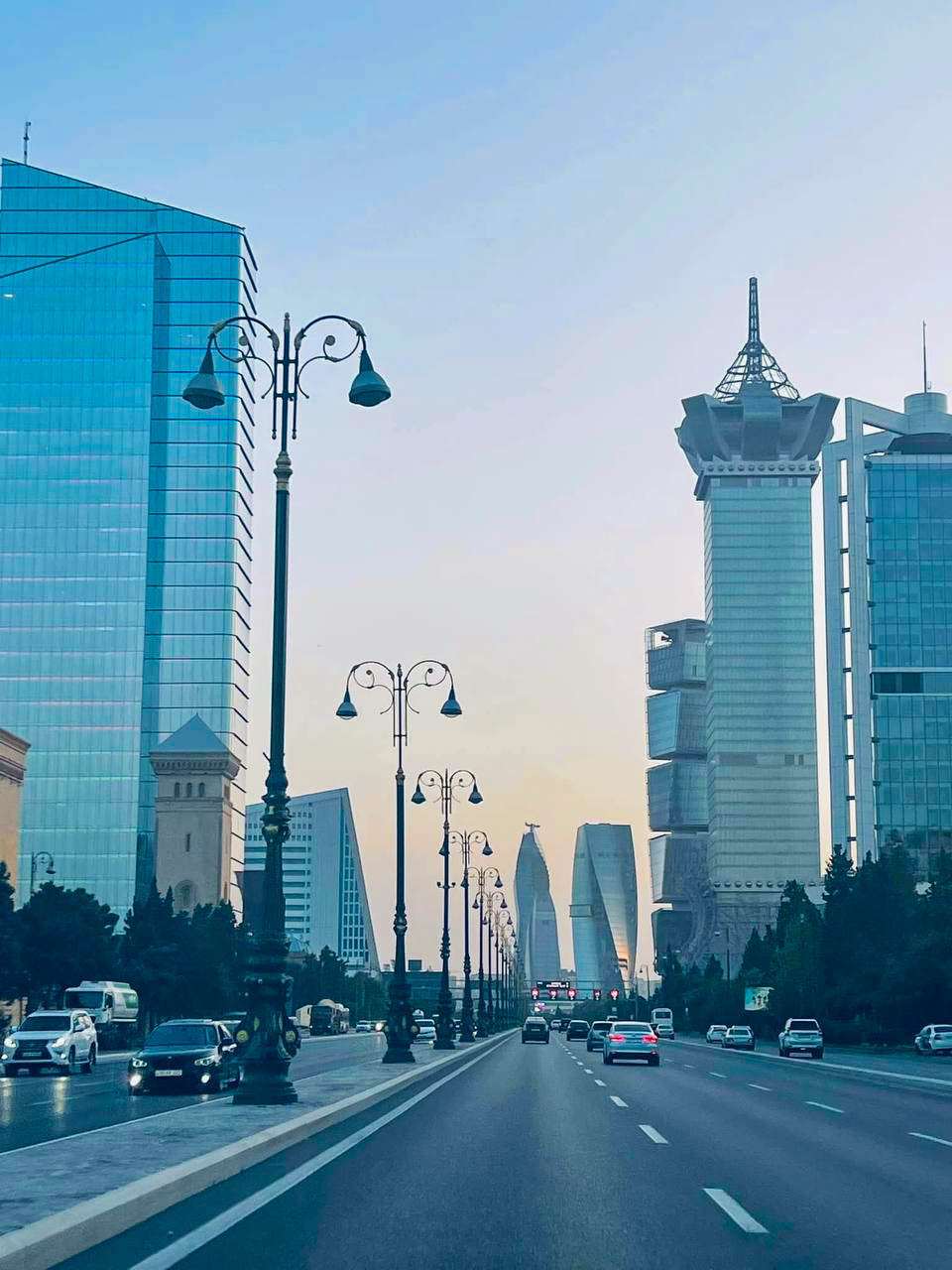
Heydar Aliyev Avenue, home to the headquarters of multiple publicly owned companies and enterprises in Azerbaijan. Along with the Bay of Baku, it hosts the majority of the country's skyscrapers

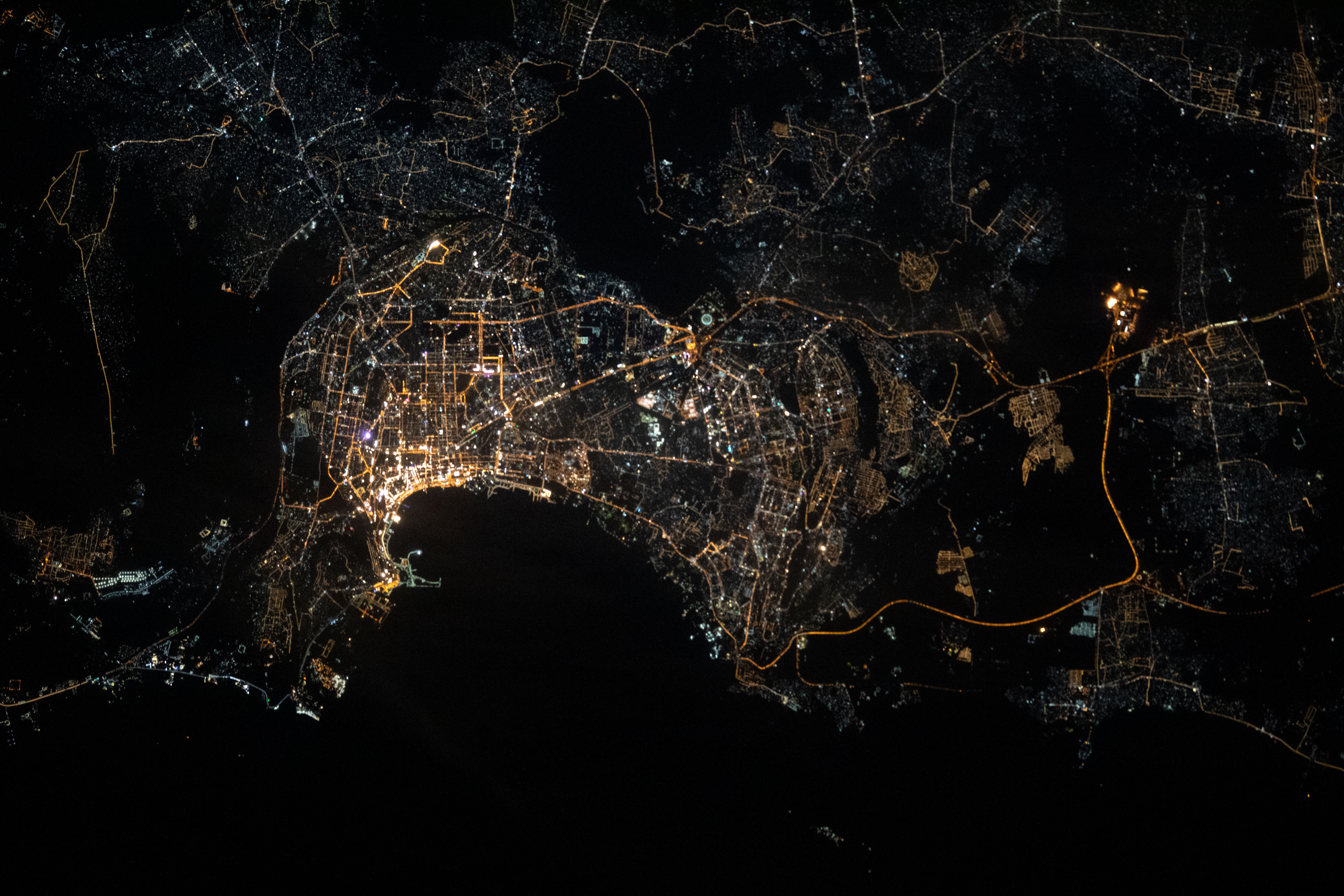
Satellite image of Baku at night

Baku's largest industry is petroleum, and its petroleum exports make it a large contributor to Azerbaijan's balance of payments. The existence of petroleum has been known since the 8th century. In the 10th century, the Arabian traveler, Marudee, reported that both white and black oil were being extracted naturally from Baku. By the 15th century, oil for lamps was obtained from hand-dug surface wells. Commercial exploitation began in 1872, and by the beginning of the 20th century the Baku oil fields were the largest in the world. Towards the end of the 20th century, much of the onshore petroleum had been exhausted, and drilling had extended into the sea offshore. By the end of the 19th century skilled workers and specialists flocked to Baku. By 1900 the city had more than 3,000 oil wells, of which 2,000 were producing oil at industrial levels. Baku ranked as one of the largest centres for the production of oil industry equipment before World War II. The World War II Battle of Stalingrad was fought to determine who would have control of Baku oil fields. Fifty years before the battle, Baku produced half of the world's oil supply.

The oil economy of Baku is undergoing a resurgence, with the development of the massive Azeri-Chirag-Guneshli field (Shallow water Gunashli by SOCAR, deeper areas by a consortium led by BP), development of the Shah Deniz gas field, the expansion of the Sangachal Terminal and the construction of the BTC Pipeline.

The Baku Stock Exchange is Azerbaijan's largest stock exchange, and largest in the Caucasian region by market capitalization. A relatively large number of transnational companies are headquartered in Baku. One of the more prominent institutions headquartered in Baku is the International Bank of Azerbaijan, which employs over 1,000 people. International banks with branches in Baku include HSBC, Société Générale and Credit Suisse.

Skyscrapers in Baku

SOCAR Tower

SOFAZ Tower

=== Tourism and shopping ===
Baku is popular tourist destination in the Caucasus. Many sizable world hotel chains have a presence in the city. Baku has many popular tourist and entertainment spots, such as the downtown Fountains Square, the One and Thousand Nights Beach, Shikhov Beach and Oil Rocks. Baku's vicinities feature Yanar Dag, an ever-blazing spot of natural gas. On 2 September 2010 with the inauguration of National Flag Square, Baku set the world record for tallest flagpole; on 24 May 2011, the city of Dushanbe in Tajikistan set a new record with a 3 metres (9.8 feet)-higher flagpole. A few years later, the Flag Pole was dismantled and the National Flag Square was closed off with fences.

Azersu Tower

Baku has several shopping malls, including Ganjlik Mall, Deniz Mall, Crescent Mall, Port Baku Mall, 28 Mall, Park Bulvar, City Park and Metro Park.

== Culture ==
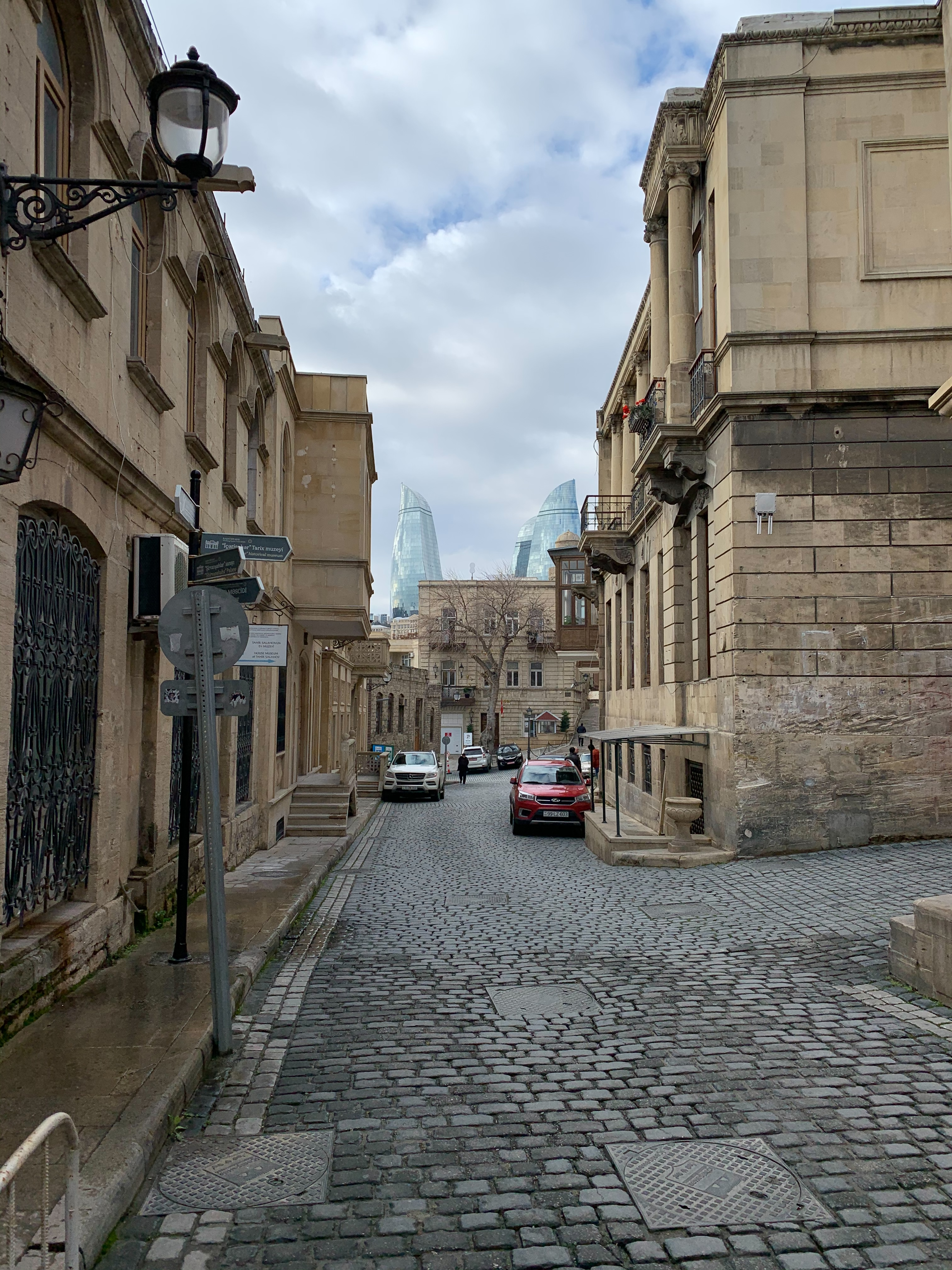
Inner City of Baku is the oldest area of the capital

Baku is often referred to as the "Paris of the East". The city's historic center, known as Icheri Sheher, the Inner City, or the Old City, has various landmarks dating back to at least the 12th century. Among these are the Maiden Tower and the Shirvanshahs' Palace. Baku has many museums and galleries, including the National Art Museum of Azerbaijan and the National Museum of History of Azerbaijan, which display both traditional Azerbaijani and contemporary art. The city maintains certain traditional crafts such as carpet-weaving and pottery, which are displayed in Azerbaijan National Carpet Museum. Baku's theaters include the Azerbaijan State Academic Opera and Ballet Theater and the Azerbaijan State Academic National Drama Theatre, which host both local and international performances. Music is an important part of Baku's cultural landscape, with mugham being a traditional genre of music that has been recognized by UNESCO as part of the Intangible Cultural Heritage of Humanity. Baku hosts events like the Baku International Jazz Festival and the Baku International Film Festival.

In 2007, the Heydar Aliyev Cultural Centre, designed by Pritzker Prize-winning architect Zaha Hadid, was opened. Baku also has many museums such as Baku Museum of Modern Art and National Museum of History, most notably featuring historical artifacts and art. Many of the city's cultural sites were celebrated in 2009 when Baku was designated an Islamic Culture Capital. Baku was chosen to host the Eurovision Dance Contest 2010. It has also become the first city to host the first European Games in 2015.

Heydar Aliyev Cultural Center

=== Theatres ===
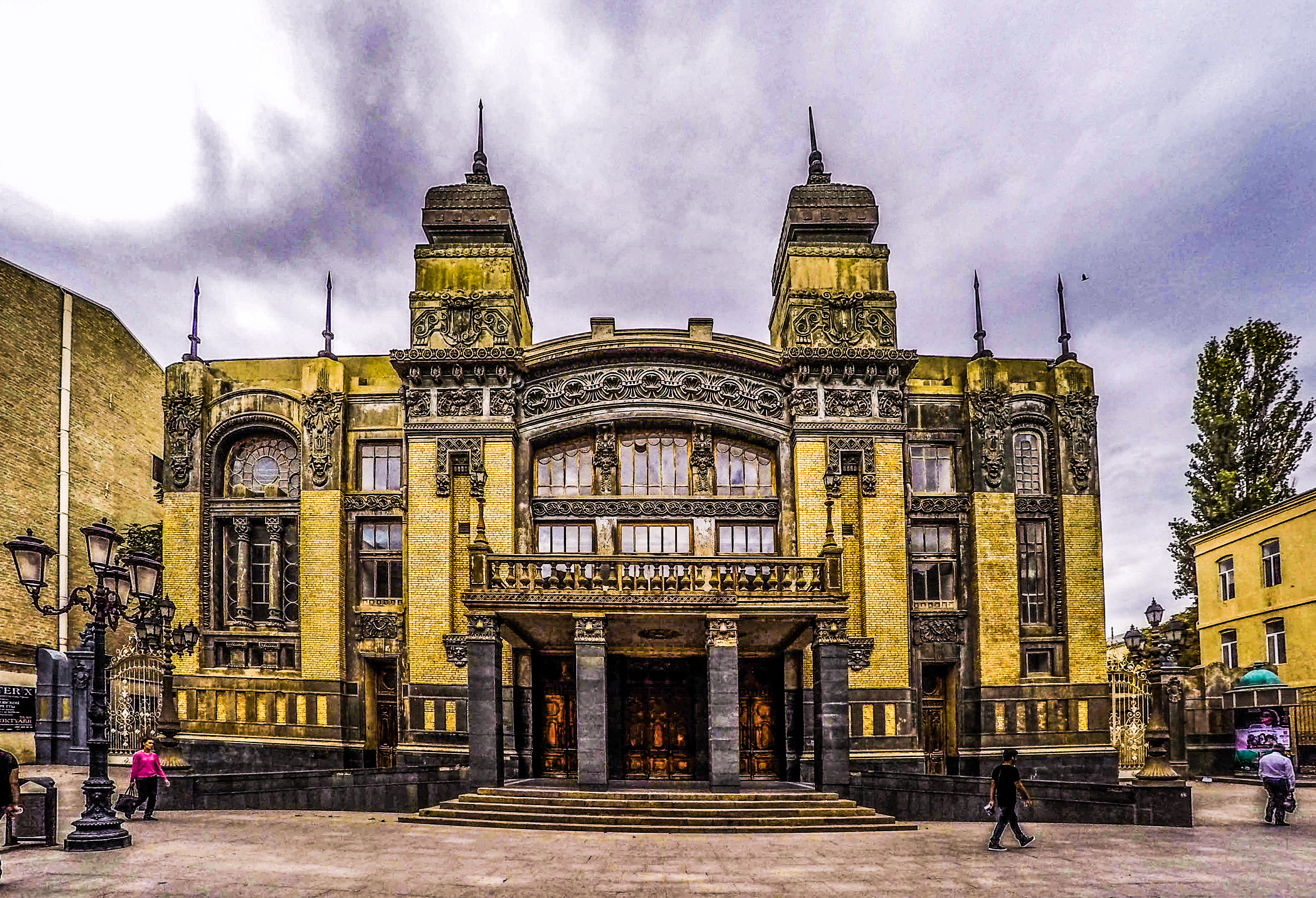
Azerbaijan State Academic Opera and Ballet Theater

- Azerbaijan State Academic Opera and Ballet Theater
- Azerbaijan State Academic National Drama Theatre
- Azerbaijan State Russian Drama Theatre named after Samad Vurgun
- Baku Puppet Theatre (formally Azerbaijan State Puppet Theatre named after Abdulla Shaig)
- Azerbaijan State Theatre of Young Spectators
- Azerbaijan State Theatre of Musical Comedy
- Baku State Circus
- "Oda" Theatre
- Baku Marionette Theatre
- Baku Municipal Theatre
- Azerbaijan State Pantomime Theatre
- Mugham Azerbaijan National Music Theatre
- Azerbaijan State Theatre of Song named after Rashid Behbudov
- "UNS" Theatre
- "Yugh" Theatre

Among Baku's cultural venues are Azerbaijan State Philharmonic Hall, Azerbaijan State Academic Opera and Ballet Theatre. The main movie theater is Azerbaijan Cinema. Festivals include Baku International Film Festival, Baku International Jazz Festival, Novruz Festival, Gül Bayramı (Flower Festival) and the National Theater Festival. International and local exhibitions are presented at the Baku Expo Centre.

=== Museums ===
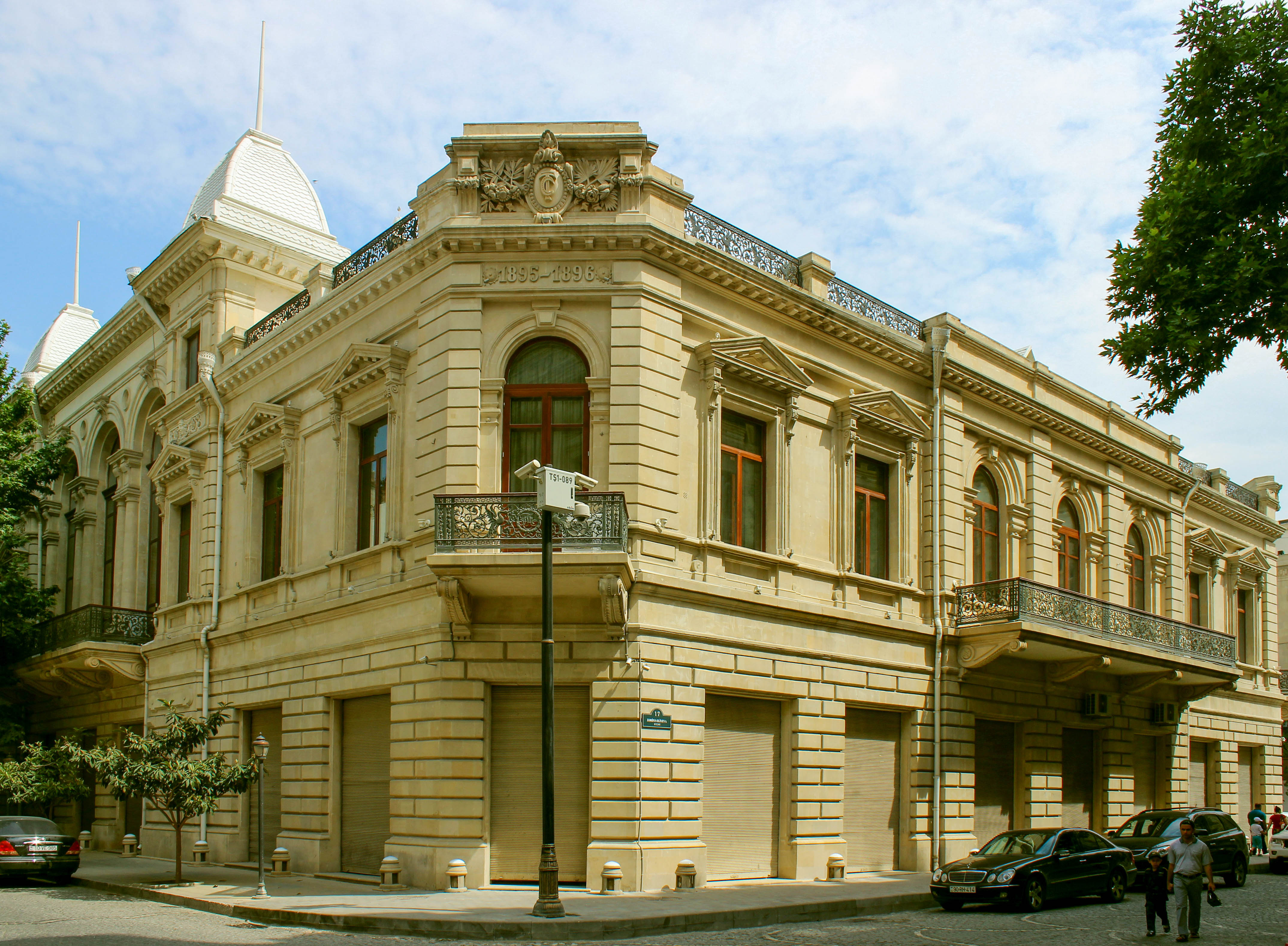
National Museum of History

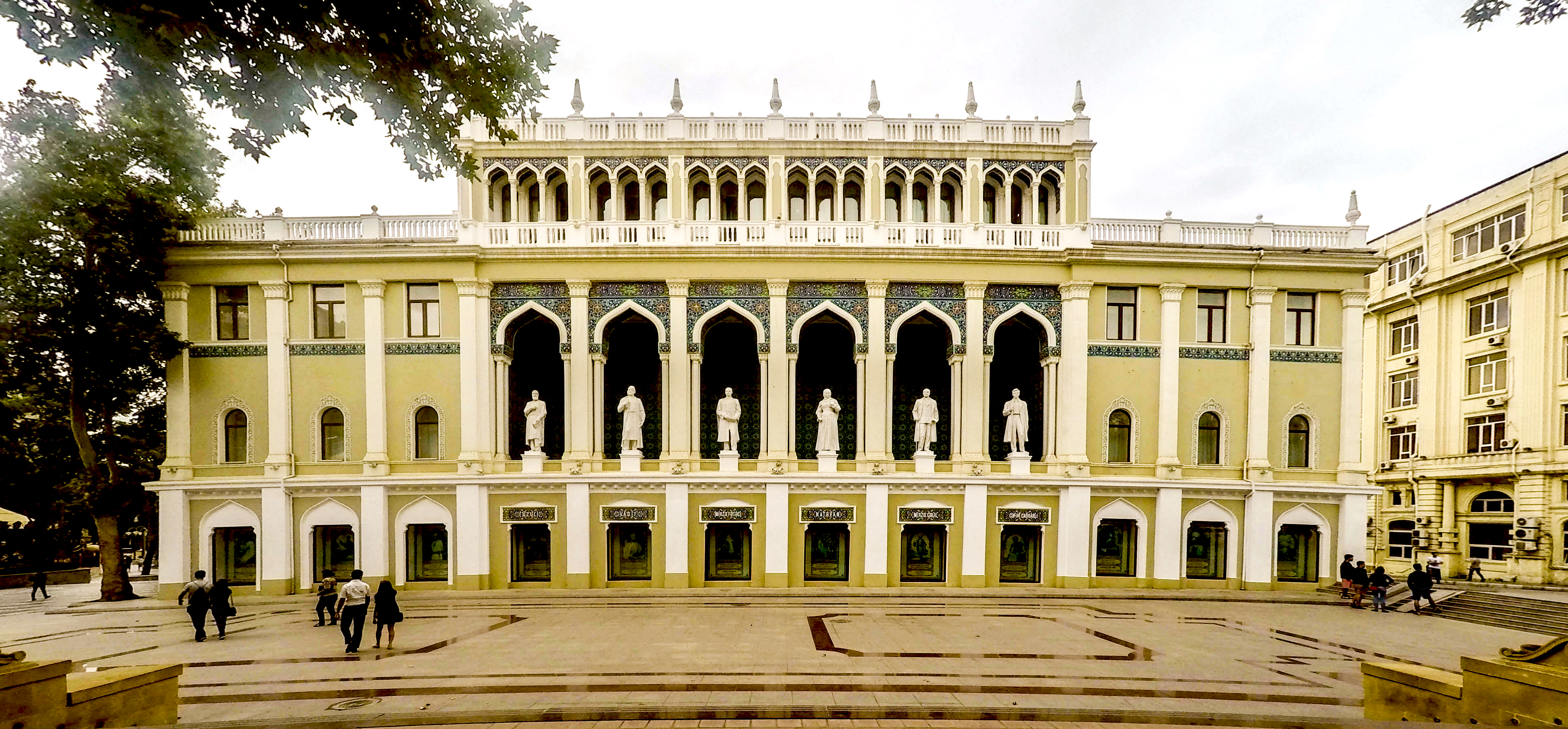
Nizami Museum of Literature

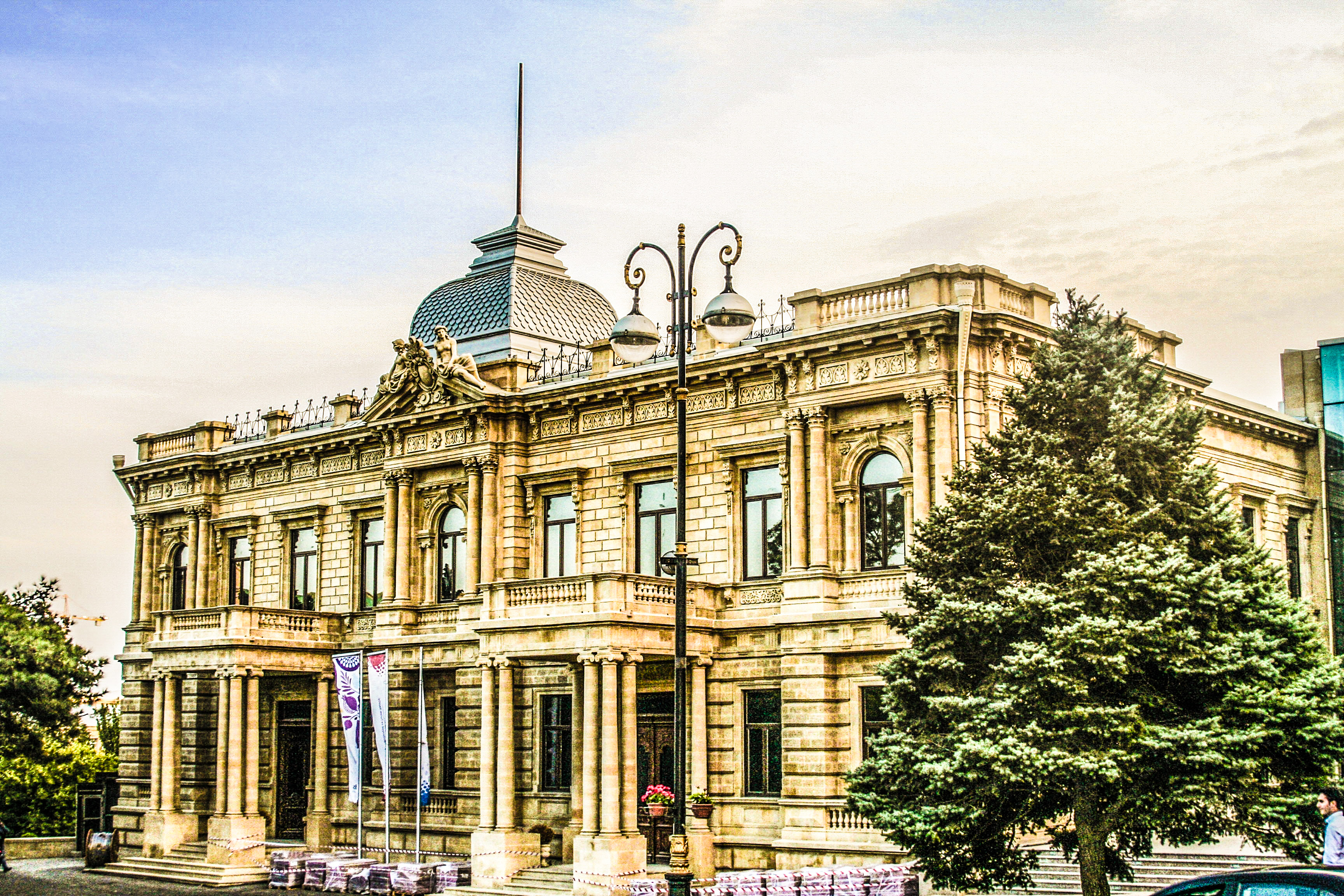
National Art Museum

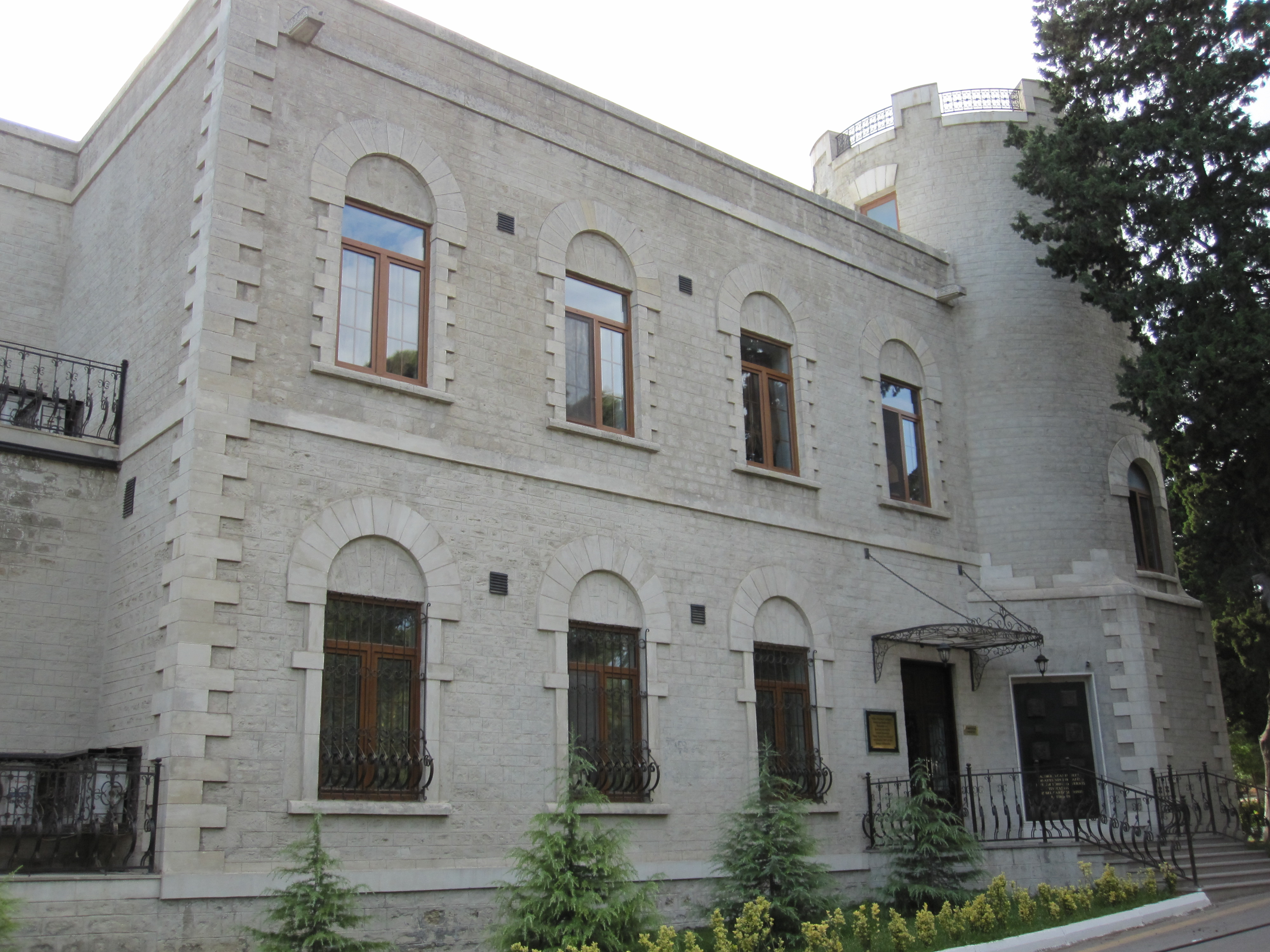
Villa Petrolea

Baku Museum of Modern Art

"From Waste to Art" Museum
- The Museum Centre
- Museum of Archaeology and Ethnography
- Azerbaijan State Carpet Museum
- Azerbaijan Museum of Geology
- "From Waste to Art" Museum

==== Absheron Museum of History and Local Studies ====
The Absheron Museum of History and Local Studies(Azerbaijani: Abşeron Tarix-Diyarşünaslıq Muzeyi) was opened in 1983. The area of the museum, which was thoroughly renovated in 2015, is 296 square meters and consists of 5 halls. Currently, about 3000 exhibits are preserved in the museum and 1800 items are displayed in the exposition. Exhibits reflecting the history, geography, nature, everyday life and culture of Absheron region are preserved in the museum. The museum consists of 4 halls, 1 fund room and 1 room for employees. The exhibition area is 250 square meters, the manager's room is 1 square meter, the fund room is 10 square meters, and the staff room is 25 square meters. In 2018, the number of visitors to the museum was 1,932.

=== Libraries ===
- National Library of Azerbaijan
- ANAS Central Library of Science
- Presidential Library (former Library of the Armenian Philanthropic Society)

=== Architecture ===
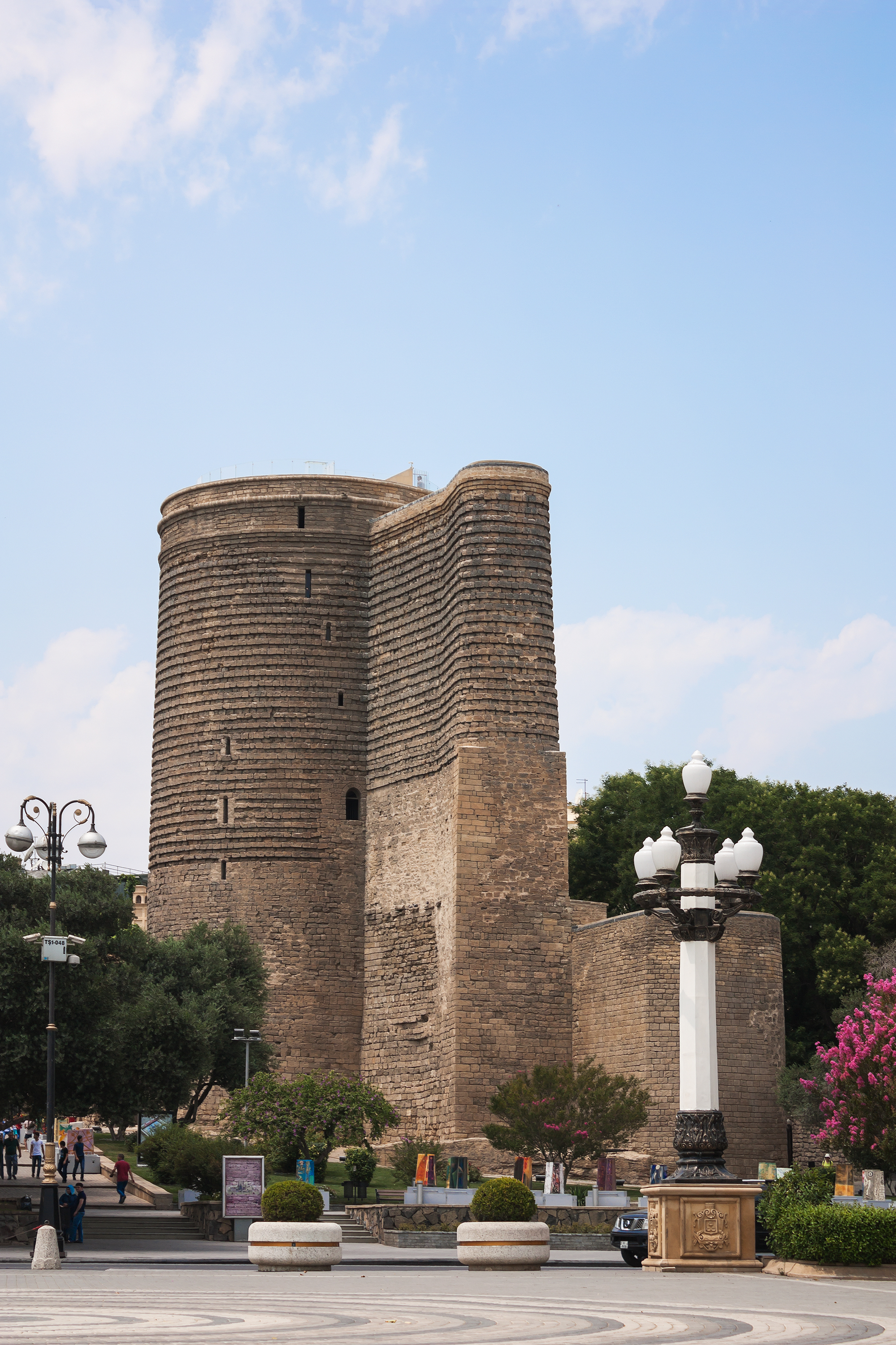
Maiden Tower in Old Baku, a UNESCO World Heritage Site built in the 11th–12th century, recognised as the symbol of the city.

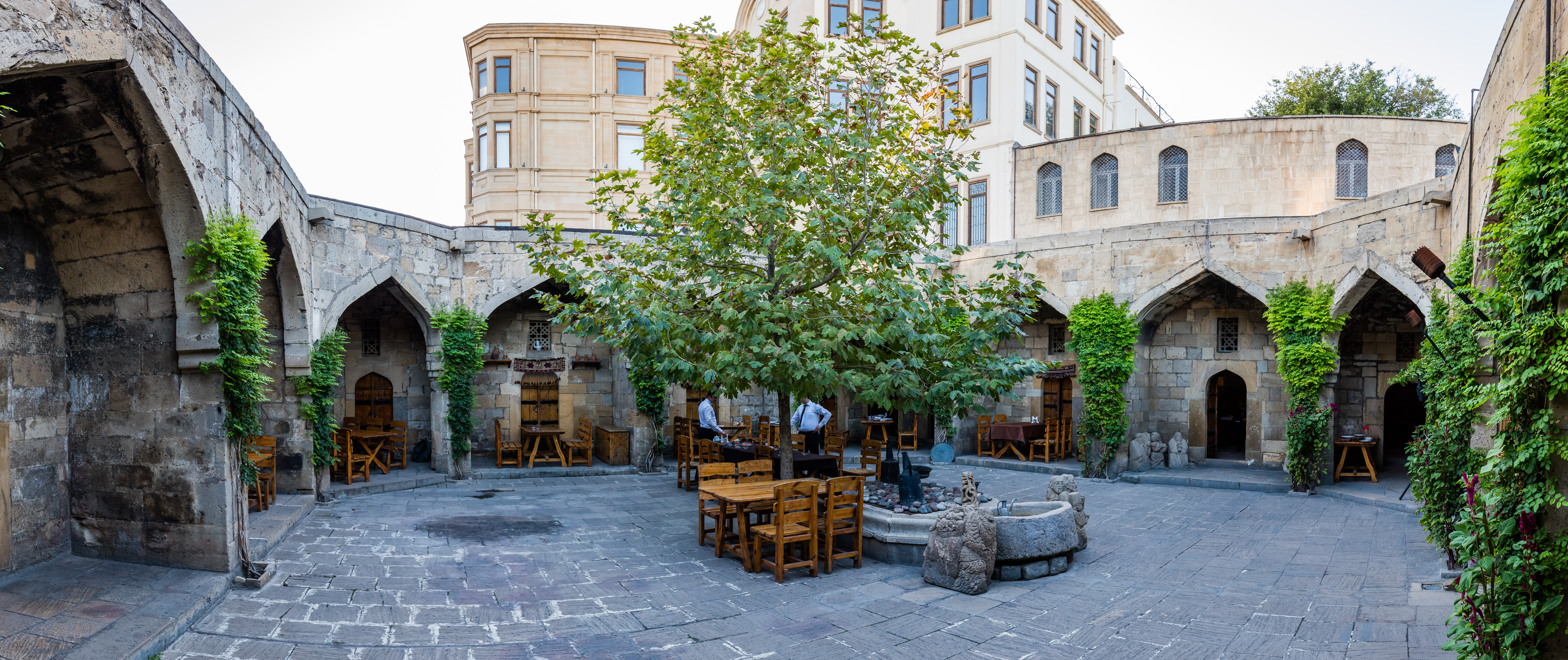
Multani Caravanserai, Baku

Baku has varying architecture, ranging from the Old City core to modern buildings and the spacious layout of Baku port. Many of the city's landmarks were built during the early 20th century, when architectural elements of the European styles were combined in eclectic style. Baku has an original and unique appearance, earning it a reputation as the Paris of the East. Baku joined UNESCO's Network of Creative Cities as a Design City on 31 October 2019 on the occasion of World Cities' Day.

==== Hamams ====
There are a number of ancient hamams in Baku dating back to the 12th, 14th and 18th centuries. Hamams play a very important role in the architectural appearance of Baku.

==== Modern architecture ====
Late modern and postmodern architecture began to appear in the early 2000s. With economic development, old buildings such as Atlant House were razed to make way for new ones. Buildings with all-glass shells have appeared around the city, the most prominent examples being the International Mugham Center, Azerbaijan Tower, Heydar Aliyev Cultural Centre, Flame Towers, Baku Crystal Hall, Baku White City, SOCAR Tower and DENIZ Mall. These projects also caught the attention of international media as notable programmes such as Discovery Channel's Extreme Engineering did pieces focusing in on changes to the city.

The Old City of Baku, also known as the Walled City of Baku, refers to the ancient Baku settlement. Most of the walls and towers, strengthened after the Russian conquest in 1806, survived. This section is picturesque, with its maze of narrow alleys and ancient buildings: the cobbled streets past the Palace of the Shirvanshahs, two caravansaries, the baths and the Juma Mosque (which used to house the Azerbaijan National Carpet and Arts Museum but is now a mosque again). The old town core also has dozens of small mosques, often without any particular sign to distinguish them as such.

In 2003, UNESCO placed the Inner City on the List of World Heritage in Danger, citing damage from a November 2000 earthquake, poor conservation as well as "dubious" restoration efforts. In 2009 the Inner City was removed from the List of World Heritage in Danger.

=== Visual arts ===
The three main institutions for exhibiting modern and contemporary art in Baku are:

- Baku Museum of Modern Art
- Heydar Aliyev Centre
- Yarat Contemporary Art Space (Azerbaijani: Yarat Müasir İncəsənət Mərkəzi)

=== Music and media ===
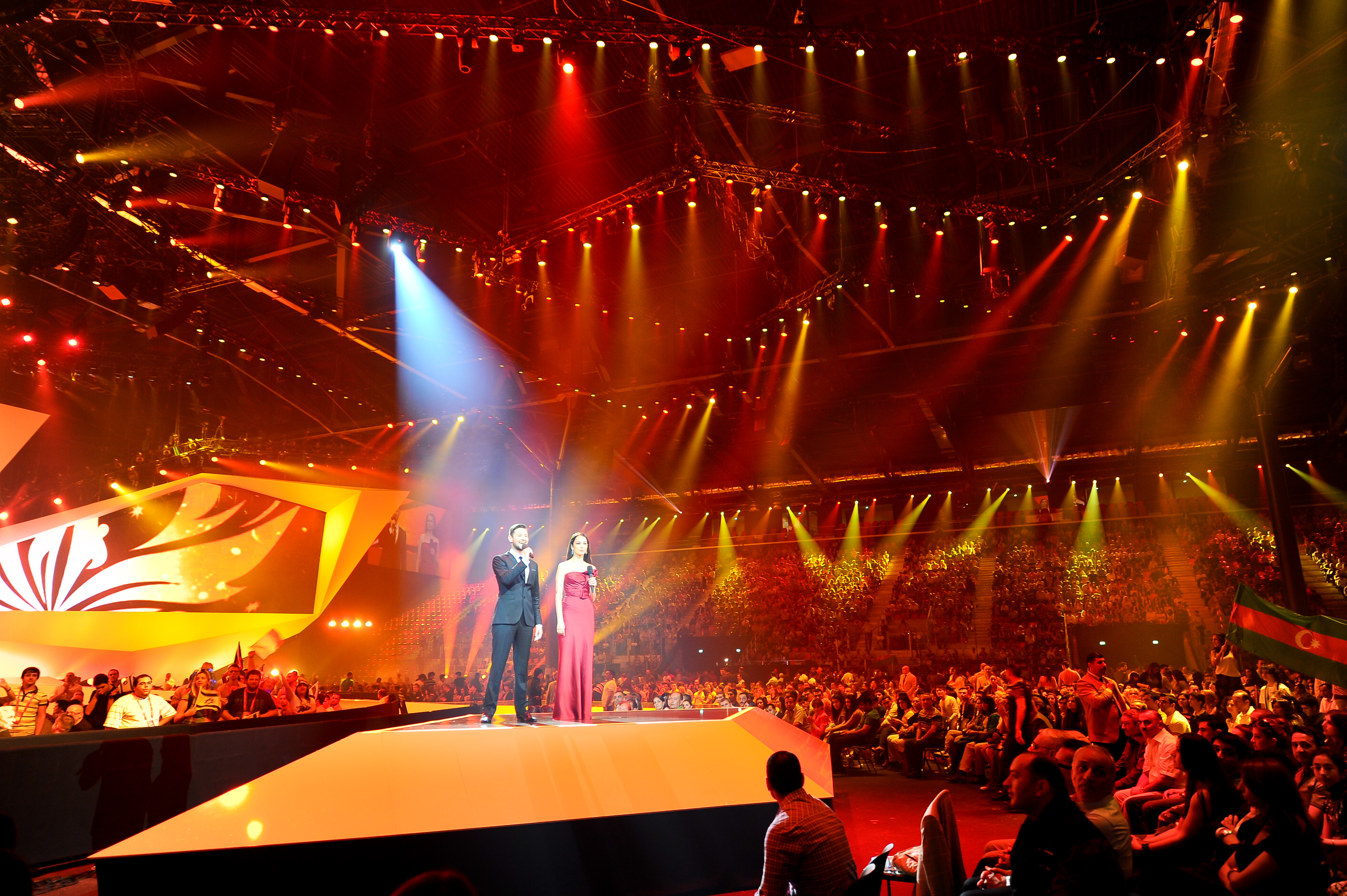
Baku Crystal Hall during the Eurovision Song Contest 2012

The music scene in Baku can be traced back to ancient times and villages of Baku, generally revered as the fountainhead of meykhana and mugham in the Azerbaijan.

Following the victory of Azerbaijan's representative Eldar & Nigar at the Eurovision Song Contest 2011, Baku hosted the Eurovision Song Contest 2012.

Among Baku's prominent annual fairs and festivals is Baku International Jazz Festival.

Baku also has an International Centre of Mugham, which is located in Baku Boulevard, Gulustan Palace and Buta Palace, one of the principal performing arts centres and music venues in the city.

The majority of Azerbaijan's media companies (including television, newspaper and radio, such as, Azad Azerbaijan TV, Ictimai TV, Lider TV and Region TV) are headquartered in Baku. The films The World Is Not Enough and The Diamond Arm, among others, are set in the city, while Amphibian Man includes several scenes filmed in Old City.

The city's radio stations include: Ictimai Radio, Radio Antenn, Burc FM, Avto FM, ASAN Radio and Lider FM Jazz

Some of Baku's newspapers include the daily Azadliq, Zaman (The Time), Bakinskiy Rabochiy (Baku Worker), Echo and the English-language Baku Today.

=== Nightlife ===
Many clubs that are open until dawn can be found throughout the city. Clubs with an eastern flavour provide special treats from the cuisine of Azerbaijan along with local music. Western-style clubs target younger, more energetic crowds. Most of the public houses and bars are located near Fountains Square and are usually open until the early hours of the morning.

=== Parks and gardens ===
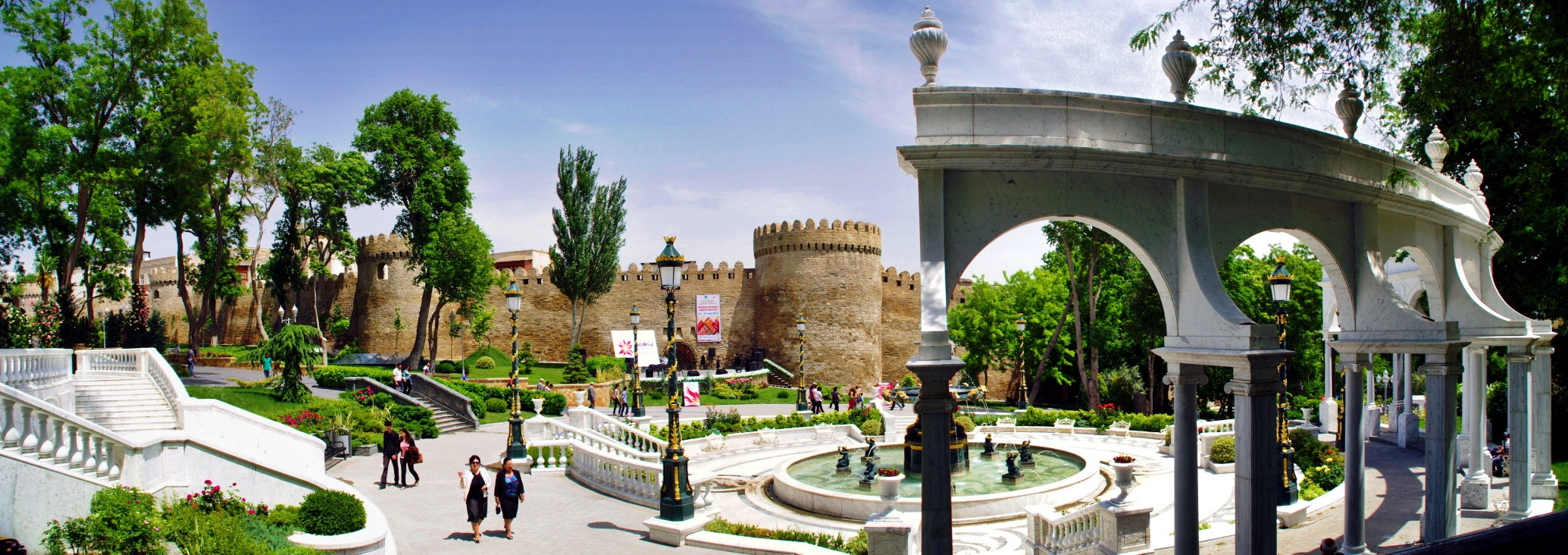
Philarmony garden

Baku has large sections of greenery, either preserved by the National Government or designated as green zones. The city, however, continues to lack a green belt development as economic activity pours into the capital, resulting in massive housing projects along the suburbs.

Baku Boulevard is a pedestrian promenade that runs parallel to Baku's seafront. The boulevard contains an amusement park, yacht club, musical fountain, statues and monuments. The park is popular with dog-walkers and joggers and is convenient for tourists. It is adjacent to the newly built International Centre of Mugham and the musical fountain.

Other parks and gardens include Heydar Aliyev Park, Samad Vurgun Park, Narimanov Park, Alley of Honor and the Fountains Square. The Martyrs' Lane, formerly the Kirov Park, is dedicated to the memory of those who died during the Nagorno-Karabakh conflict and also to the 137 people killed on Black January.

== Sports ==
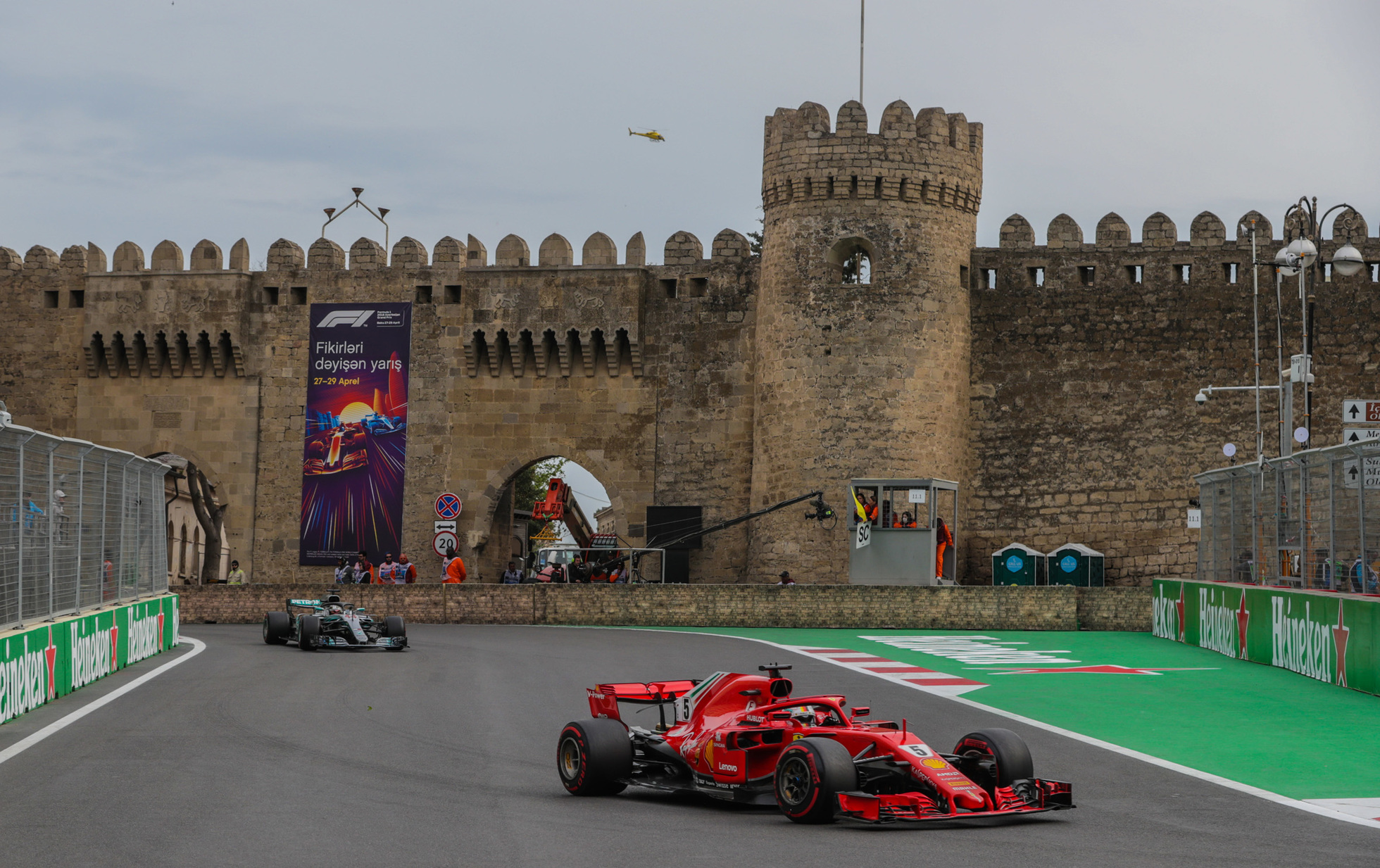
2018 Azerbaijan Grand Prix

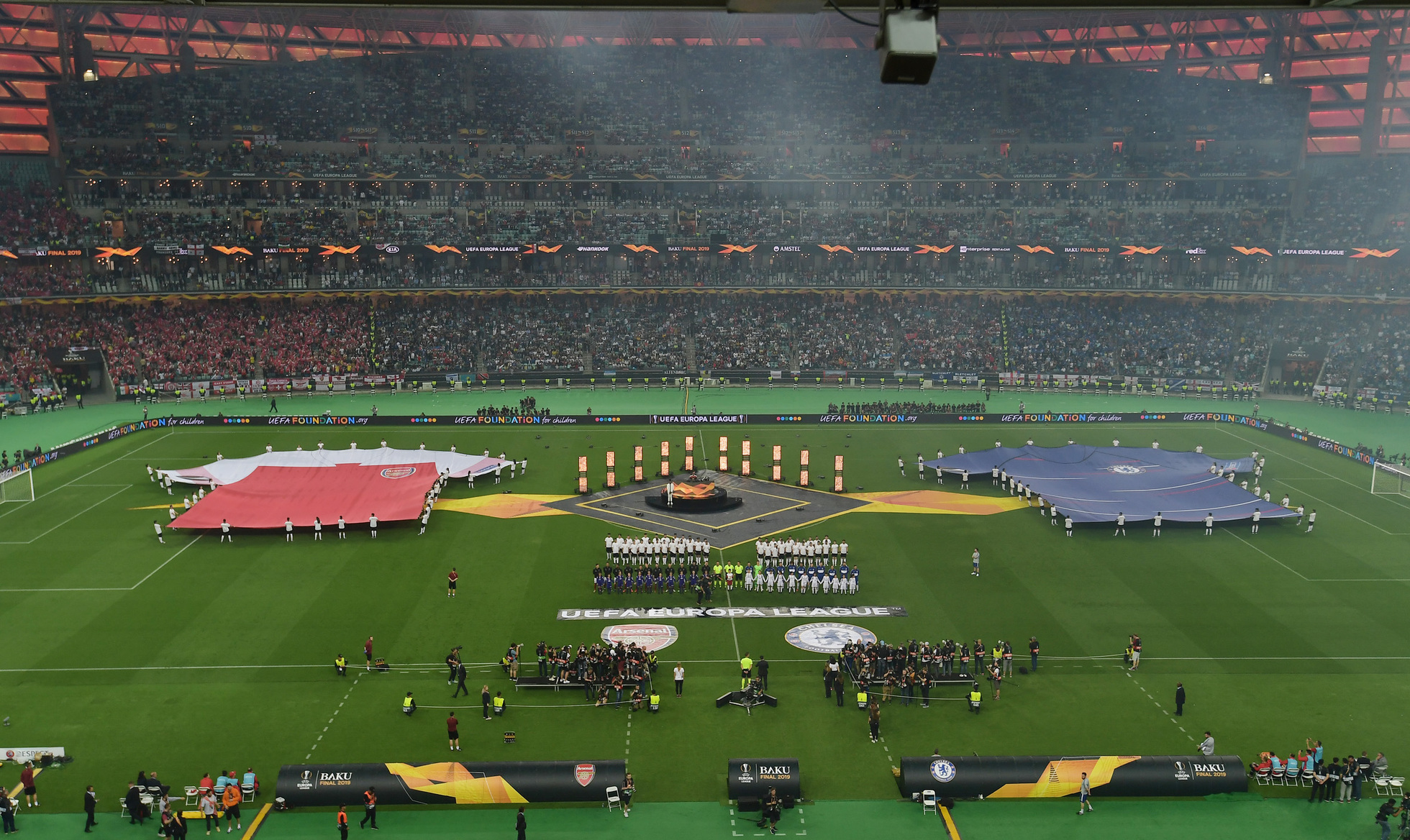
Chelsea playing against Arsenal at Baku Olympic Stadium during the 2019 UEFA Europa League Final

Baku hosts a Formula One race on the Baku City Circuit. The first was the 2016 European Grand Prix, with the track going around the old city. The track measures 6.003 km (3.730 mi), and it has been on the Formula One calendar since its 2016 debut.

The city also hosted three group games and one quarter-final of the UEFA Euro 2020 European Football Championship.

Since 2002, Baku has hosted 36 major sporting events and also hosted the 2015 European Games, which was the first edition. Baku is also to host the fourth edition of the Islamic Solidarity Games in 2017.

Baku is also one of world's leading chess centres, having produced grandmasters like Teimour Radjabov, Vugar Gashimov, Garry Kasparov, Shahriyar Mammadyarov and Rauf Mammadov, as well as the arbiter Faik Hasanov. The city also annually hosts the international tournaments such as Baku Chess Grand Prix, President's Cup, Baku Open and bidding to host 42nd Chess Olympiad in 2014.

First class sporting facilities were built for the indoor games, including the Palace of Hand Games and Heydar Aliyev Sports and Exhibition Complex. It hosted many sporting events, including FIFA U-17 Women's World Cup, Rhythmic Gymnastics European Championships in 2007 and 2009, 2005 World Rhythmic Gymnastics Championships, 2007 FILA Wrestling World Championships and 2010 European Wrestling Championships, 2011 World Amateur Boxing Championships, 2009 Women's Challenge Cup and European Taekwondo Championships in 2007. Since 2011 the city annually hosts WTA tennis event called Baku Cup.

The Synergy Baku Cycling Project participates in the Tour d'Azerbaïdjan a 2.2 multi-stage bicycle race on the UCI Europe Tour.

Baku made a bid to host the 2016 Summer Olympics and 2020 Summer Olympics, but failed to become a Candidate City both times.

The largest sports hub in the city is Baku Olympic Stadium with 69,870 seating capacity, whose construction was completed in 2015. UEFA Europa League Final 2019 was played at the Olympic Stadium in Baku on 29 May 2019 between English sides Chelsea and Arsenal. The city's main football clubs is Neftçi Baku of who first has nine Premier League titles, making Neftchi the second most successful Azerbaijani football club. Baku also has several football clubs in the premier and regional leagues, including Zira in the Premier League, and Sabail in the First League. The city's second-largest stadium, Tofiq Bahramov Stadium hosts a number of domestic and international competitions and was the main sports centre of the city for a long period until the construction of Baku Olympic Stadium.

In the Azerbaijan Women's Volleyball Super League, Baku is represented by Rabita Baku, Azerrail Baku, Lokomotiv Baku and Azeryol Baku.

Baku has been designated the World Capital of Sport for 2026.

== Transport ==
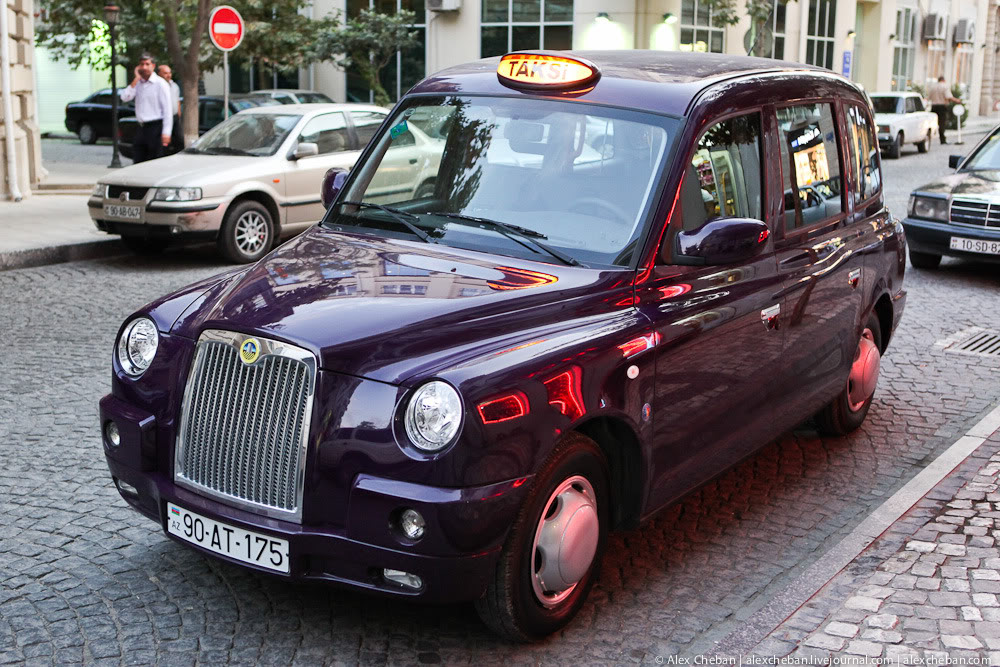
Baku black cab, introduced in 2011

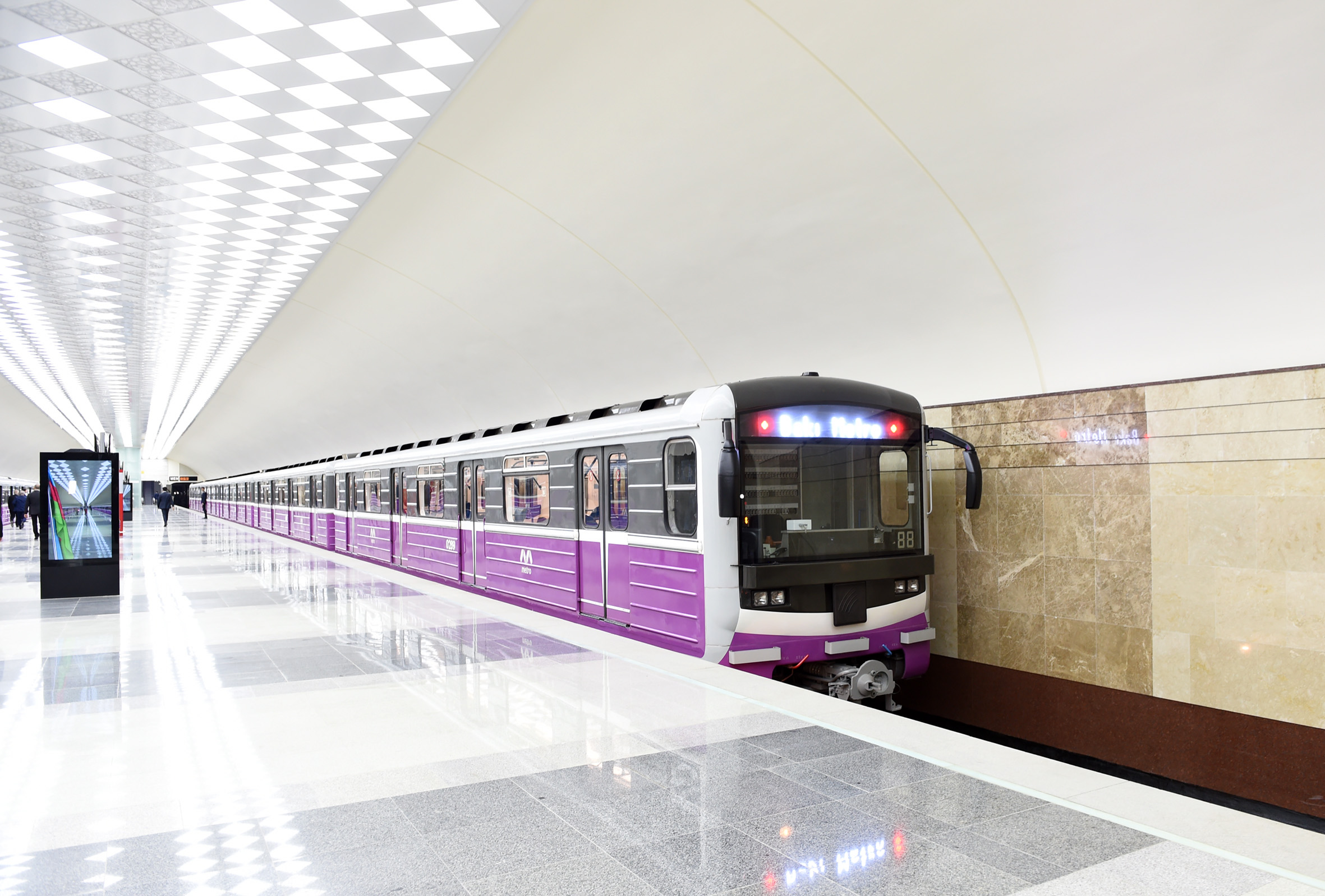
Baku Metro

Throughout history, the transport system of Baku used the now-defunct horsecars, trams and narrow gauge railways. As of 2011, 1,000 black cabs are ordered by Baku Taxi Company, and as part of a programme originally announced by the Transport Ministry of Azerbaijan, there is a plan to introduce London cabs into Baku. The move was part of £16 million agreement between Manganese Bronze subsidiary LTI Limited and Baku Taxi Company.

Local rail transport includes the Baku Funicular and the Baku Metro. Baku Metro was opened in November 1967 and includes 3 lines and 25 stations. In 2008, the plans to construct 41 new stations over the next 17 years were announced. These will serve the new bus complex and the international airport. In 2019, the Baku suburban railway opened.

Baku Railway Station is the terminus for national and international rail links to the city. The Kars–Tbilisi–Baku railway, which directly connects Turkey, Georgia and Azerbaijan, began to be constructed in 2007 and opened in 2017.

Baku Funicular

Shipping services operate regularly from Baku across the Caspian Sea to Turkmenbashi (formerly Krasnovodsk) in Turkmenistan and to Bandar Anzali and Bandar Nowshar in Iran. The commuter ferries, along with the high-speed catamaran Seabus (Deniz Avtobusu), also form the main connection between the city and the Absheron peninsula.

Baku Port was founded in 1902 and claims to be the largest Caspian Sea port. It has six facilities: the main cargo terminal, the container terminal, the ferry terminal, the oil terminal, the passenger terminal and the port fleet terminal. The port's throughput capacity reaches 15 million tonnes of liquid bulk and up to 10 million tons of dry cargoes. In 2010, the Baku International Sea Trade Port began to be reconstructed. The construction was planned to take place in three stages and to be completed by 2016. The estimated costs were US$400 million. From April to November, Baku Port is accessible to ships loading cargoes for direct voyages from Western European and Mediterranean ports. The State Road M-1 and the European route E60 are the two main motorway connections between Europe and Azerbaijan.

The Heydar Aliyev International Airport is the only commercial airport serving Baku. There are also several military airbases near Baku, such as Baku Kala Air Base.

== Education ==
- Baku Oxford School, international school

=== Secondary schools ===
- Elite Gymnasium

== Health care ==
According to the Ministry of Healthcare, healthcare facilities in Baku are "highly developed compared with the regions and doctors are waiting to work there. The regions, meanwhile, lack both doctors and clinics providing specialized medical treatment." Resulting in citizens travelling for many hours to Baku to receive adequate medical treatment.

== Notable residents ==
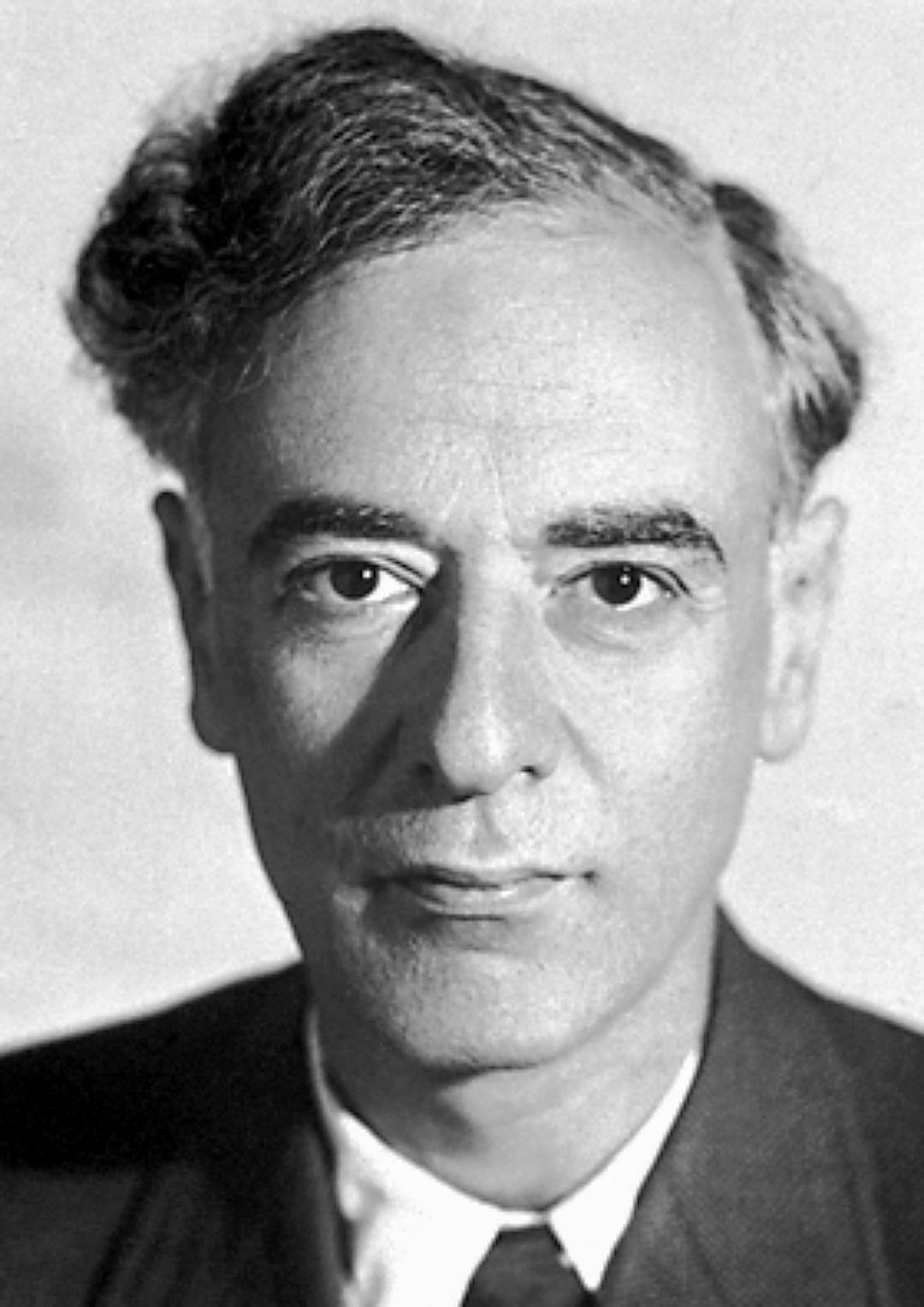
Physicist Lev Landau, Baku State University student, winner of the Nobel Prize in Physics in 1962

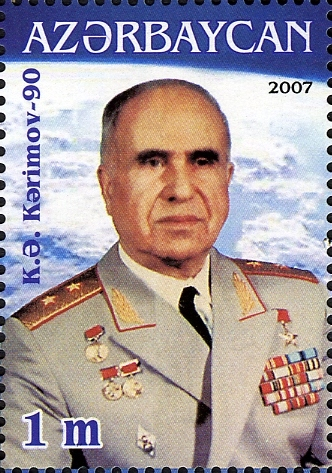
Kerim Kerimov, one of the founders of the Soviet space program

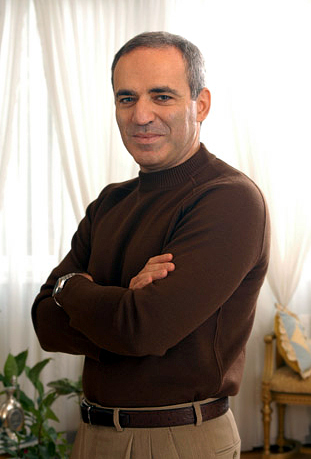
Garry Kasparov, chess grandmaster, former World Chess Champion

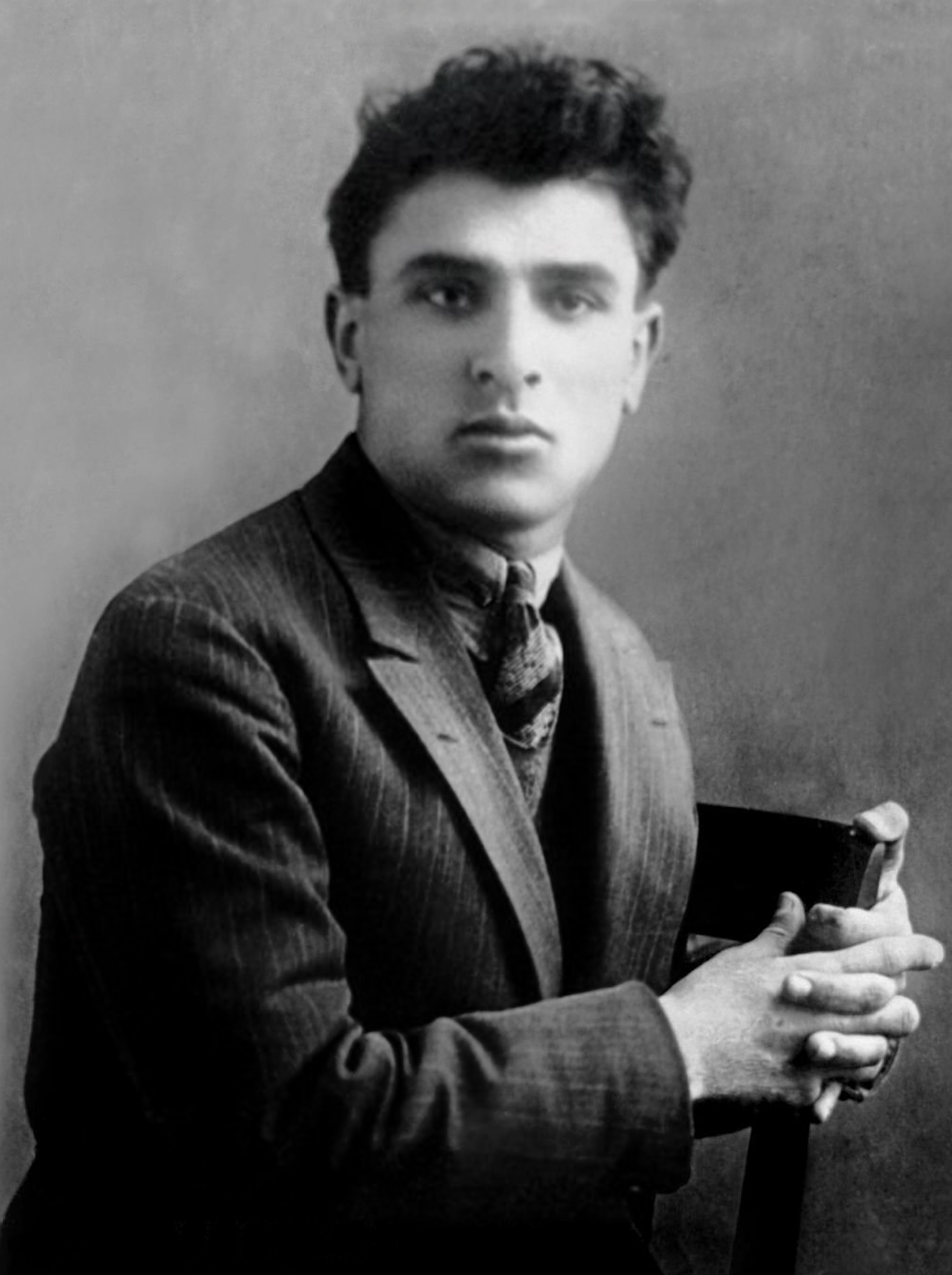
Mikayil Mushfig, Bakuvian poet and victim of the Stalinist purges

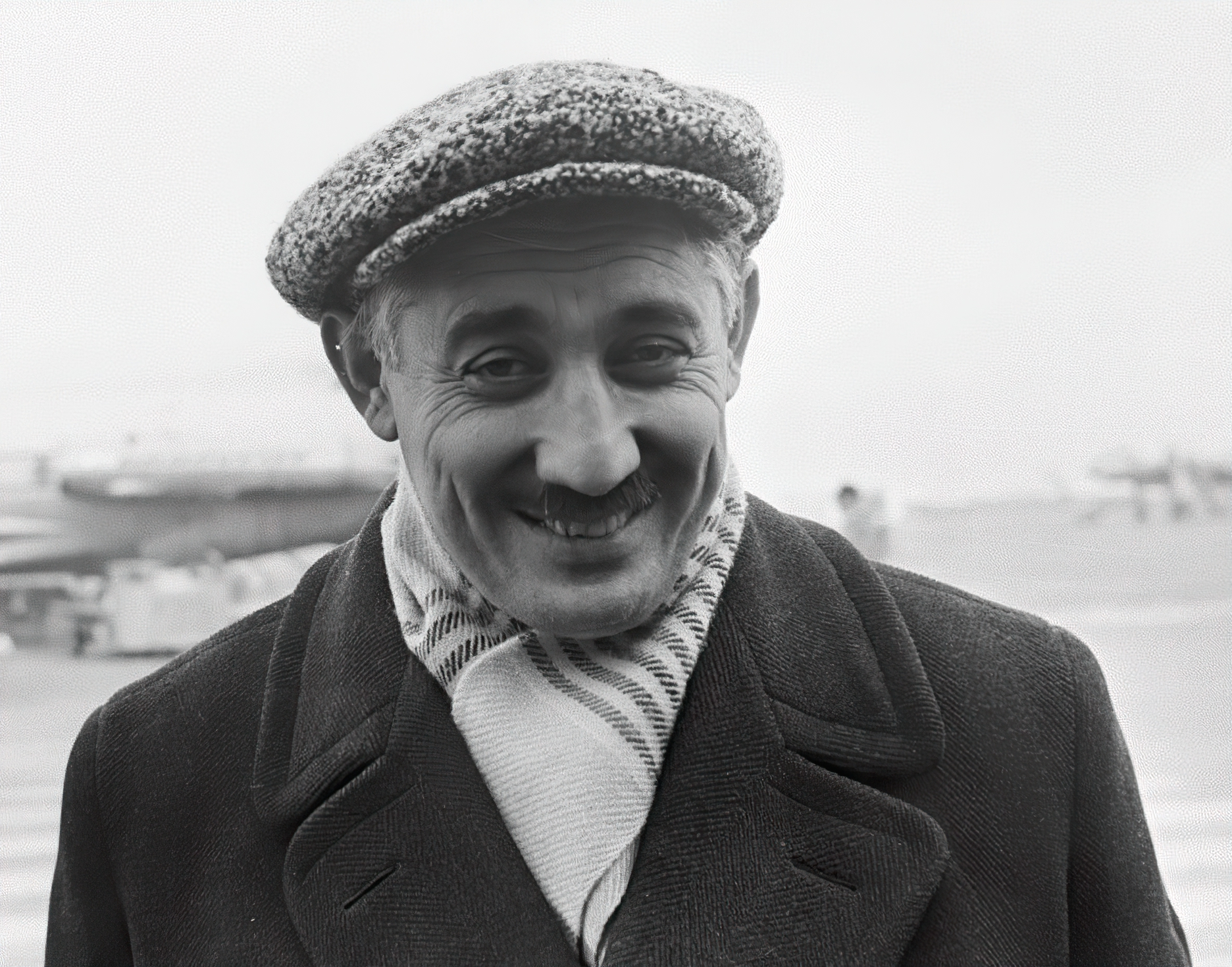
Tofiq Bahramov, a Soviet footballer and football referee from Azerbaijan

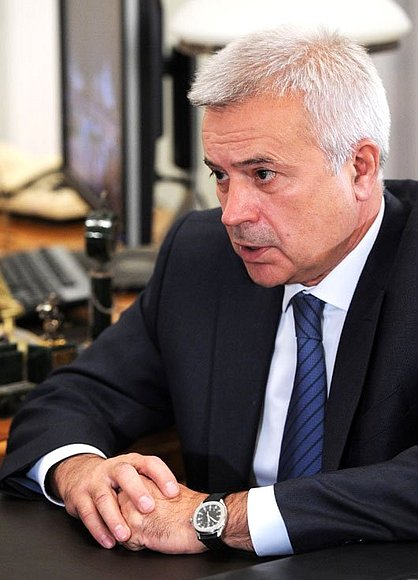
Vagit Alekperov, President of the leading Russian oil company LUKOIL

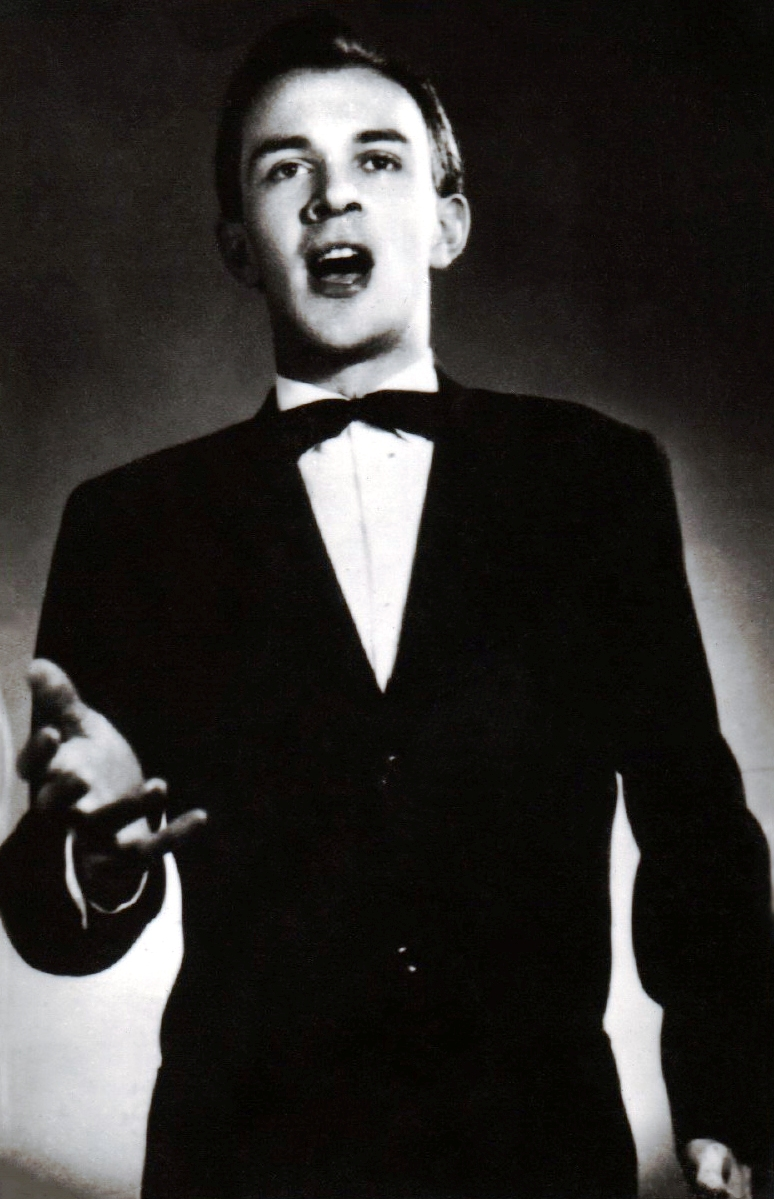
Muslim Magomayev, singer

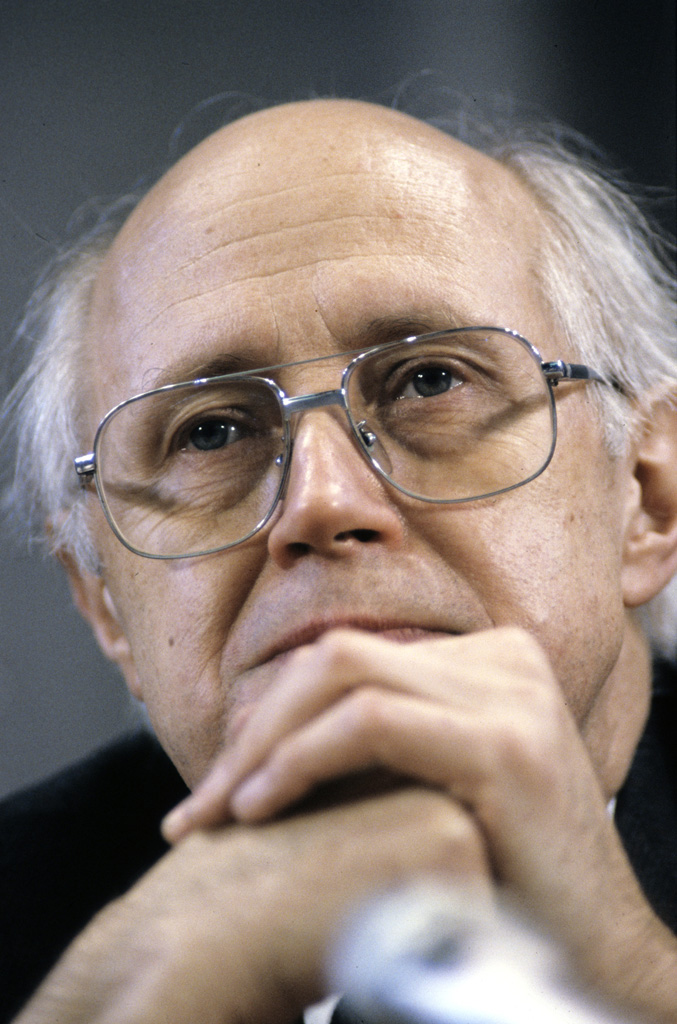
Mstislav Rostropovich, Grammy Award–winning cellist

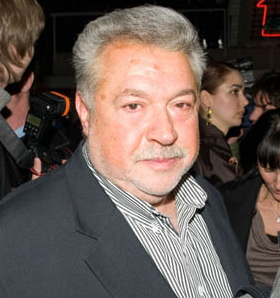
Yuli Gusman, film director and actor, founder and CEO of the Nika Award

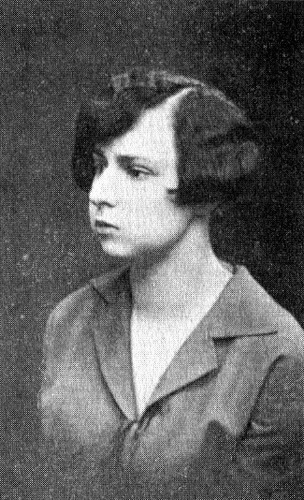
Natallia Arsiennieva, Belarusian playwright, poet and translator

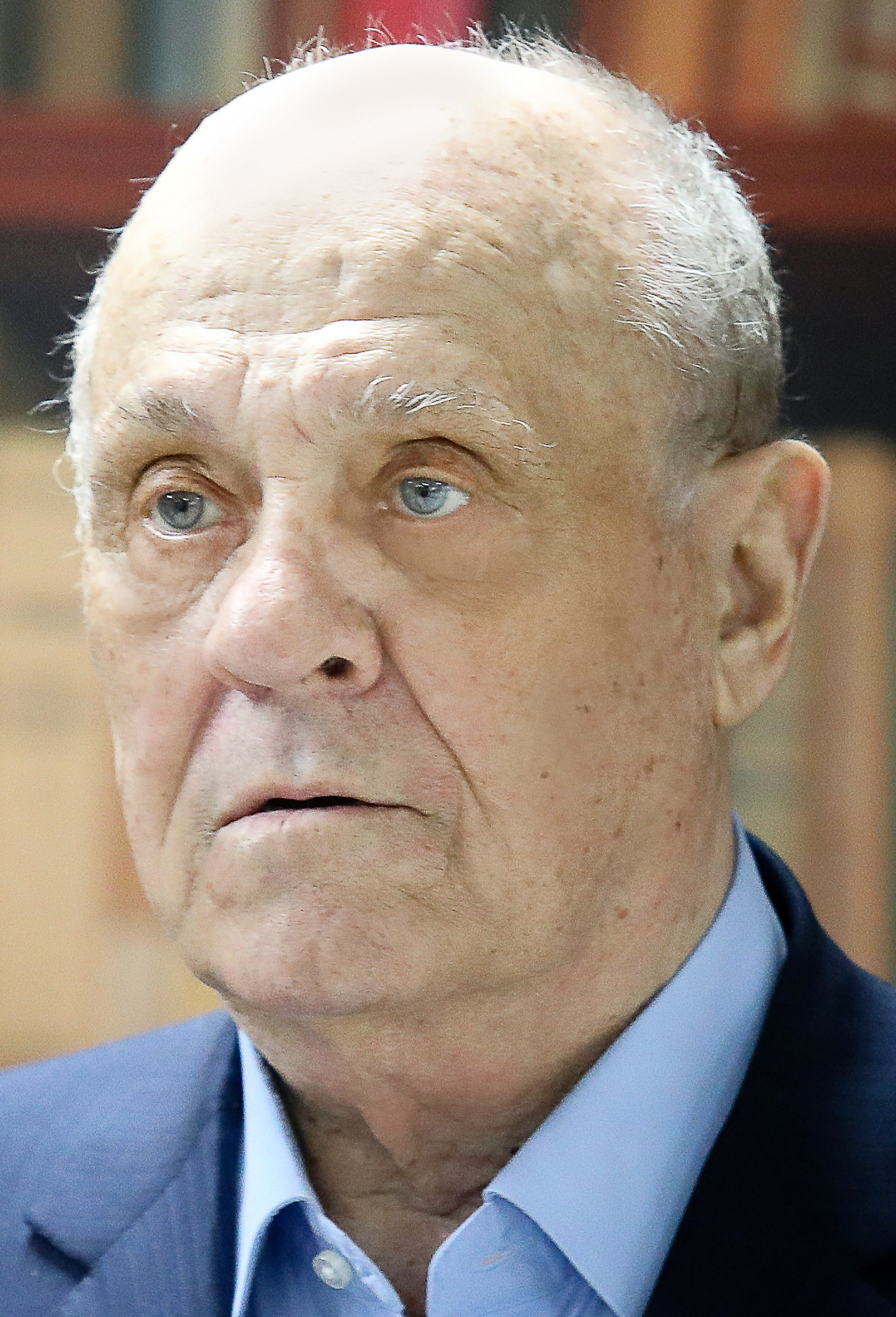
Vladimir Menshov, Soviet and Russian actor and film director

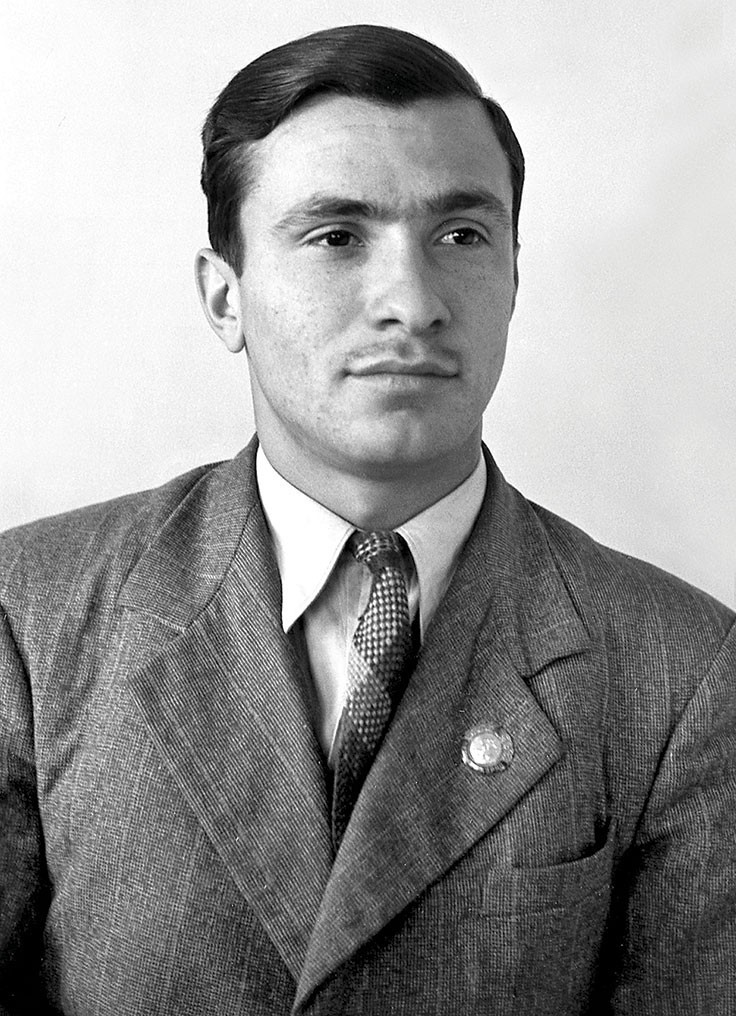
Alakbar Mammadov, Soviet footballer, four-time champion player in the Soviet Top League

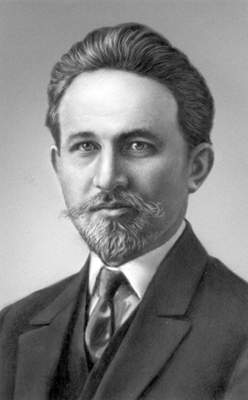
Matvey Skobelev, Russian revolutionary and politician

== International relations ==
=== Twin towns and sister cities ===
Baku is twinned with:^{[in chronological order]}

Country	City	State / Province / Region / Governorate	Date
Senegal	(Senegal) Dakar	Dakar Region	1967
Italy	(Italy) Naples	Campania	1972
Iraq	(Iraq) Basra	Basra Governorate	1972
Bosnia and Herzegovina	(Bosnia and Herzegovina) Sarajevo	Sarajevo Canton	1975
United States	(United States) Christiansted	Virgin Islands	1976
United States	(United States) Houston	Texas	1976
France	(France) Bordeaux	Aquitaine	1979
Iran	(Iran) Tabriz	East Azerbaijan province	1980
Turkey	(Turkey) İzmir	İzmir Province	1985
Vietnam	(Vietnam) Vũng Tàu	Bà Rịa–Vũng Tàu province	1985
Russia	(Russia) Moscow	Moscow City	
Russia	(Russia) Saint Petersburg	Saint Petersburg City	
United States	(United States) Honolulu County	Hawaii	1998
Turkey	(Turkey) Sivas	Sivas Province	2000
Brazil	(Brazil) Rio de Janeiro	State of Rio de Janeiro	2013
Ukraine	(Ukraine) Kyiv	Kyiv City	2021
Israel	(Israel) Haifa	Haifa District	
South Africa	(South Africa) Johannesburg	Johannesburg City	
South Africa	(South Africa) Pretoria	Pretoria City	
Turkey	(Turkey) Ankara	Ankara City	2016
Saudi Arabia	(Saudi Arabia) Jeddah	Jeddah City	
Kyrgyzstan	(Kyrgyzstan) Bishkek	Bishkek City	2022
Tajikistan	(Tajikistan) Dushanbe	Dushanbe City	2022

=== Partner cities ===
- Mainz, Germany (1984)
- Paris, France
- Vienna, Austria
- (Georgia (country)) Tbilisi, Georgia
- Astana, Kazakhstan
- Minsk, Belarus (2024)
- Moscow, Russia
- Volgograd, Russia
- Kizlyar, Russia
- Tashkent, Uzbekistan
- Chengdu, China

== See also ==
- Baku Gradonachalstvo
- 1920 Baku Congress
- Alexander III visit to Baku
- Administrative divisions of Azerbaijan
- List of cities in Azerbaijan
- Mingachevir
- Nakhchivan
- Sumgait

== Notes ==
Preceded by Alexandria, Djibouti, Lahore	Capital of Islamic Culture; 2009	Succeeded by Tarim
