= Dashli ada =

Azerbaijani island in the Caspian Sea

Native name: Daşlı ada
- Interactive map of Dashli ada

Geography
- Coordinates: 39°37′13″N 49°42′43″E

Dashli ada (Azerbaijani: Daşlı ada), Ignat Dash or Kamen Ignatiya (Russian: Камень Игнатия, lit. 'Ignatius Rock') is an island in the Caspian Sea. It is one of the islands of Baku Archipelago located in the Bay of Baku, 74 km to the south of Baku. Dashli ada is part of the Baku Archipelago, which consists of the following islands: Boyuk Zira, Dash Zira, Qum Island, Zenbil, Sangi-Mugan, Chikil, Qara Su, Khara Zira, Gil and a few smaller ones. The island is located 32.2 km east of Cape Bandovan. The closest island to Dashly - Adsiz Ada - is 13.9 km to the north. The island is of volcanic origin and has a mud volcano.

== Discovery ==
The island was discovered during Russo-Persian War (1722–1723), the island was named St. Ignatius Rock (Russian: Камень Святого Игнатия) on a map drawn by the Russians. The island was named after Ignatius of Antioch because it was explored on his feast day.

== Volcanic eruptions ==
On July 4, 2021, at 21:51, an 8-minute-long strong eruption from the mud volcano was recorded on the island. The blaze was observed in the form of a red light in the sky off the coast from Azerbaijan, including from the capital Baku, which is 74 km to the north. The flames towered 500 meters into the air. The last previous volcanic eruption on the island was recorded in 1945, and the preceding one in 1920.
