= Geography of Azerbaijan =

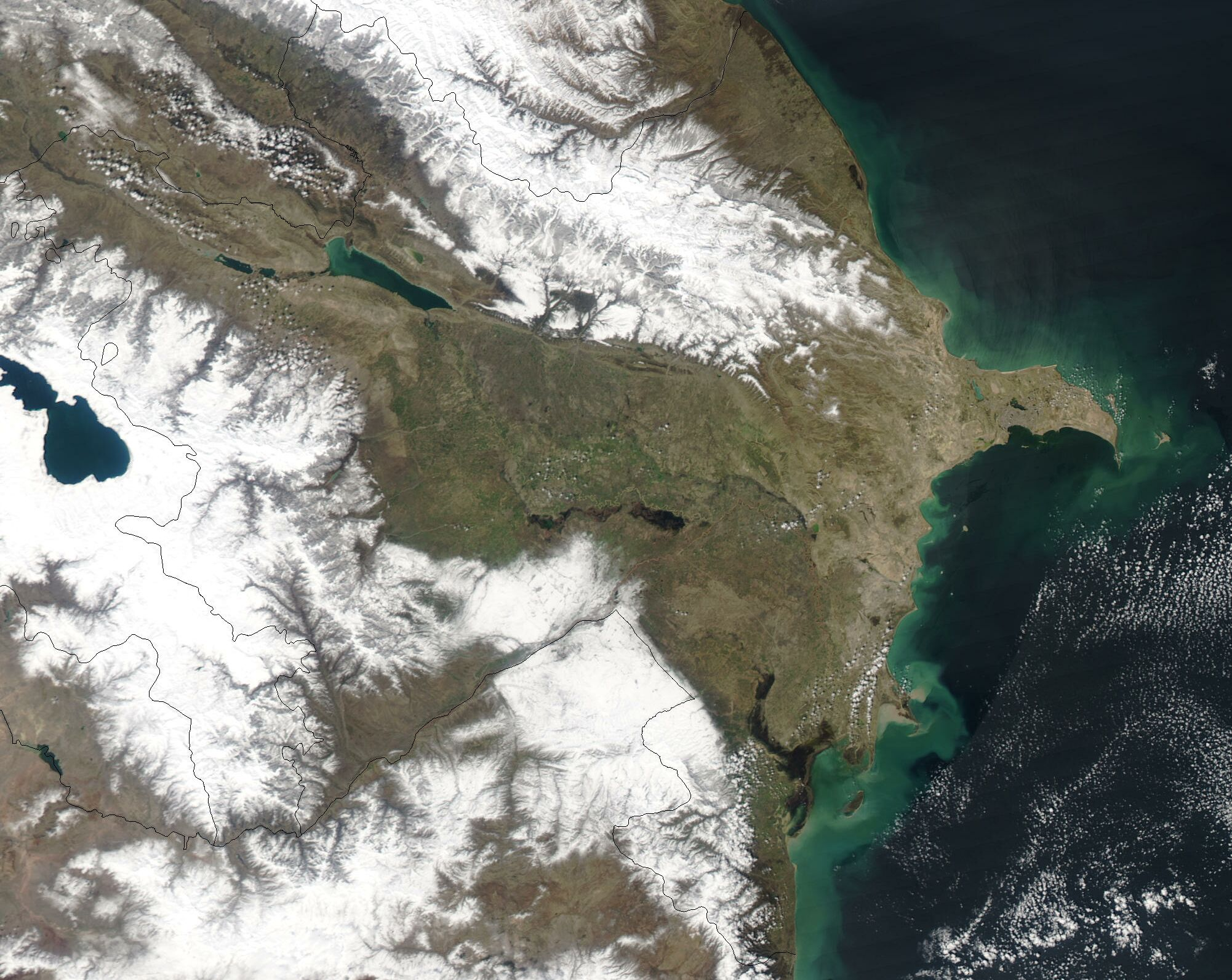
- Continent: Europe and Asia
- Region: Caucasus
- Coordinates: 40°30′N 47°30′E
- Area: Ranked 112th
  - Total: 86,600 km^{2} (33,400 sq mi)
  - Land: 99.87%
  - Water: 0.13%
- Coastline: 713 km (443 mi)
- Highest point: Bazardüzü; 4,466 m (14,652 ft)
- Lowest point: Caspian Sea −28 m (−92 ft)
- Longest river: Kura River; 1,514 km (941 mi)
- Largest lake: Mingachevir reservoir 605 km^{2} (234 mi^{2})
- Climate: subtropical and humid in the southeast, subtropical and dry in the center and east, continental and humid in the mountains, and continental and dry in Nakhchivan
- Terrain: mountainous and lowlands
- Natural resources: Petroleum, natural gas, iron ore, nonferrous metals, bauxite
- Natural hazards: Droughts and floods, rising levels of the Caspian Sea
- Environmental issues: air pollution, water pollution, desertification, hazardous wastes, marine dumping, ship pollution
- Exclusive economic zone: None, the Caspian Sea is a lake

Azerbaijan map of Köppen climate classification zones

Azerbaijan is a country in the Caucasus region, situated at the juncture of Eastern Europe and West Asia. Three physical features dominate Azerbaijan: the Caspian Sea, whose shoreline forms a natural boundary to the east; the Greater Caucasus mountain range to the north; and the extensive flatlands at the country's center. About the size of Portugal or the US state of Maine, Azerbaijan has a total land area of approximately 86,600 square kilometres (33,400 sq mi). Azerbaijan has the greatest land area of the three Transcaucasian states. Special administrative subdivisions are the Nakhchivan Autonomous Republic, which is separated from the rest of Azerbaijan by a strip of Armenian territory, and the Nagorno-Karabakh Autonomous Region, entirely within Azerbaijan. The status of Nagorno-Karabakh is internationally recognized as territory of Azerbaijan.

Located in the region of the southern Caucasus Mountains, Azerbaijan borders the Caspian Sea to the east, Georgia and Russia to the north, Iran to the south, and Armenia to the southwest and west. A small part of Nakhchivan also borders Turkey to the northwest. The capital of Azerbaijan is the ancient city of Baku, which has the largest and best harbor on the Caspian Sea and has long been the center of the republic's oil industry.

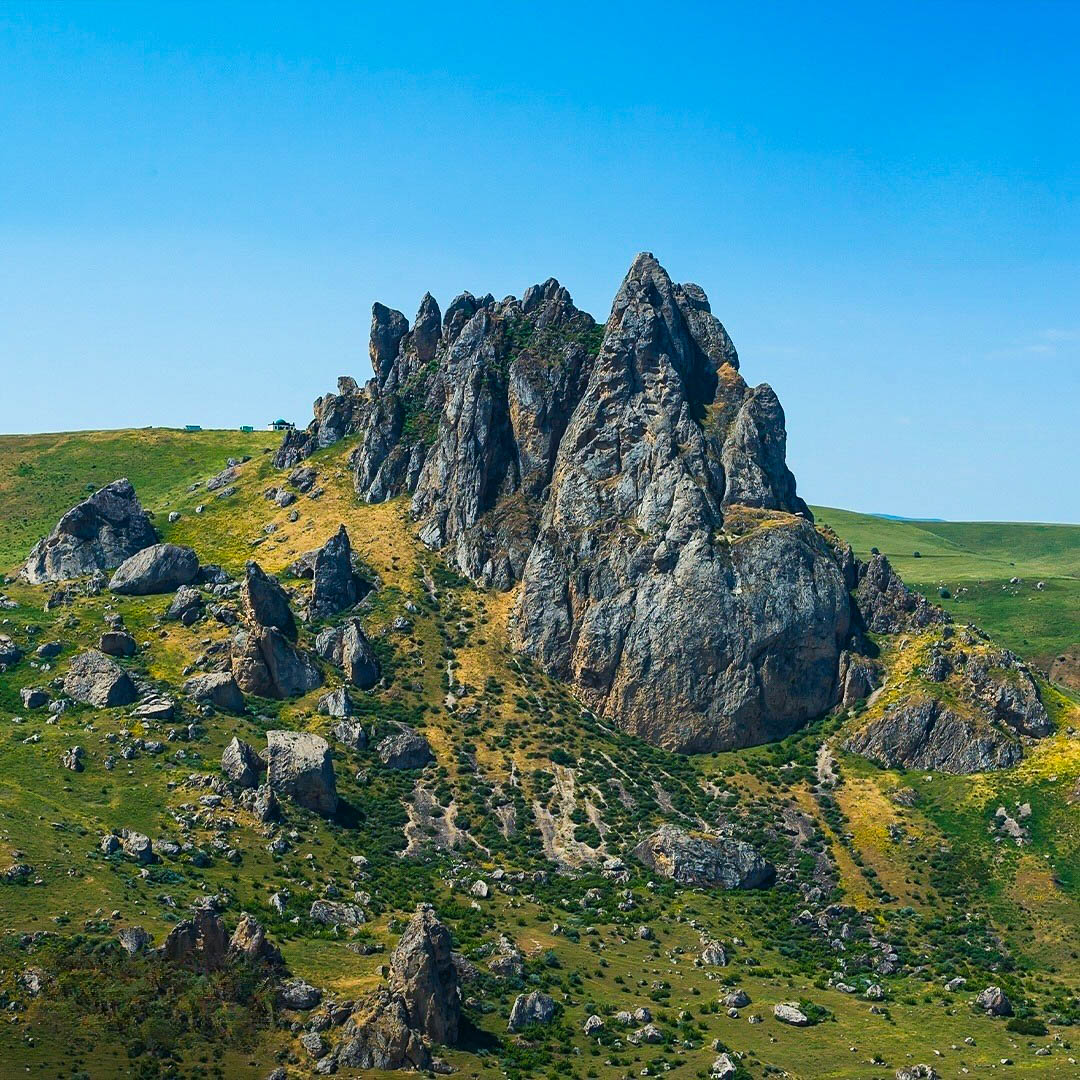
Beşbarmaq mountain in 2024

== Topography and drainage ==
Topographic map of Azerbaijan

The elevation changes over a relatively short distance from lowlands to highlands; nearly half the country is considered mountainous. Notable physical features are the gently undulating hills of the subtropical southeastern coast, which are covered with tea plantations, orange groves, and lemon groves; numerous mud volcanoes and mineral springs in the ravines of Kobustan Mountain near Baku; and coastal terrain that lies as much as twenty-eight meters below sea level.

Except for its eastern Caspian shoreline and some areas bordering Georgia and Iran, Azerbaijan is ringed by mountains. To the northeast, bordering Russia's Dagestan Autonomous Republic, is the Greater Caucasus range; to the west, bordering Armenia, is the Lesser Caucasus range. To the extreme southeast, the Talysh Mountains form part of the border with Iran. The highest elevations occur in the Greater Caucasus, where Mount Bazardüzü rises 4,466 meters above sea level. Eight large rivers flow down from the Caucasus ranges into the central Kura-Aras Lowlands, alluvial flatlands and low delta areas along the seacoast designated by the Azerbaijani name for the Mtkvari River (Kura) and its main tributary, the Aras. The Mtkvari, the longest river in the Caucasus region, forms the delta and drains into the Caspian a short distance downstream from the confluence with the Aras. The Mingachevir Reservoir, with an area of 605 square kilometers that makes it the largest body of water in Azerbaijan, was formed by damming the Kura in western Azerbaijan. The waters of the reservoir provide hydroelectric power and irrigation of the Kura–Aras plain. Most of the country's rivers are not navigable. About 15% of the land in Azerbaijan is arable.

Map of Azerbaijan

== Mountains ==
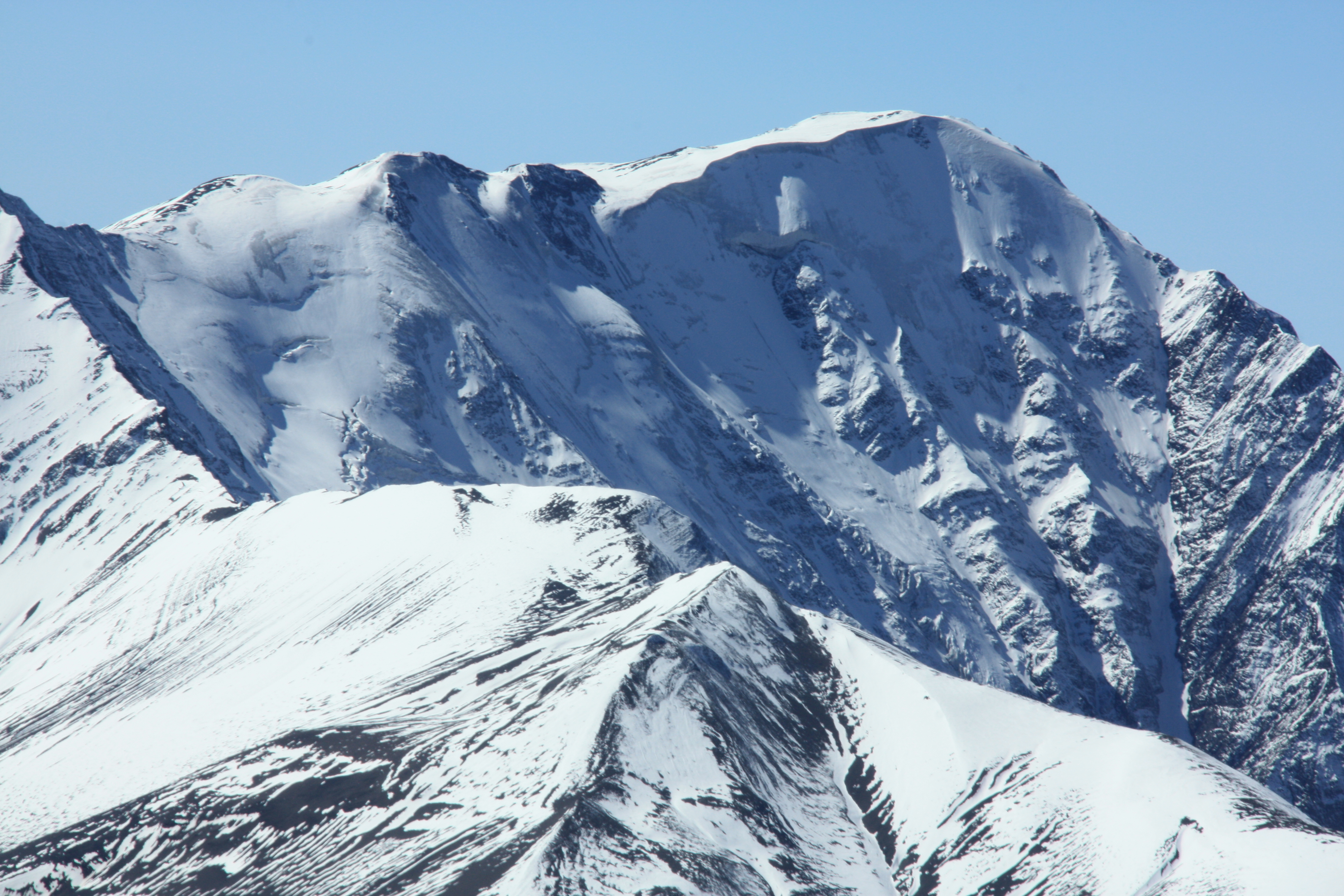
Bazarduzu

The country's highest peak, Bazardüzü, rises to 4,485 metres (14,715 ft) at the Azerbaijan-Russia border.

== Climate ==
=== Temperature ===
The climate varies from subtropical and humid in the southeast to subtropical and dry in central and eastern Azerbaijan, continental and humid in the mountains, and continental and dry in Nakhchivan. Baku, on the Caspian, enjoys mild weather that averages 4 °C (39.2 °F) in January and 25 °C (77 °F) in July.

=== Precipitation ===
Physiographic conditions and different atmosphere circulations admit 8 types of air currents including continental, sea, arctic, tropical currents of air that formulates the climate of the Republic. The maximum annual precipitation falls in Lenkeran (1,600 to 1,800 millimetres or 63 to 71 inches) and the minimum in Absheron (200 to 350 millimetres or 8 to 14 inches). The maximum daily precipitation of 334 millimetres or 13.1 inches was observed at the Bilieser Station in 1955.

== Environmental problems ==
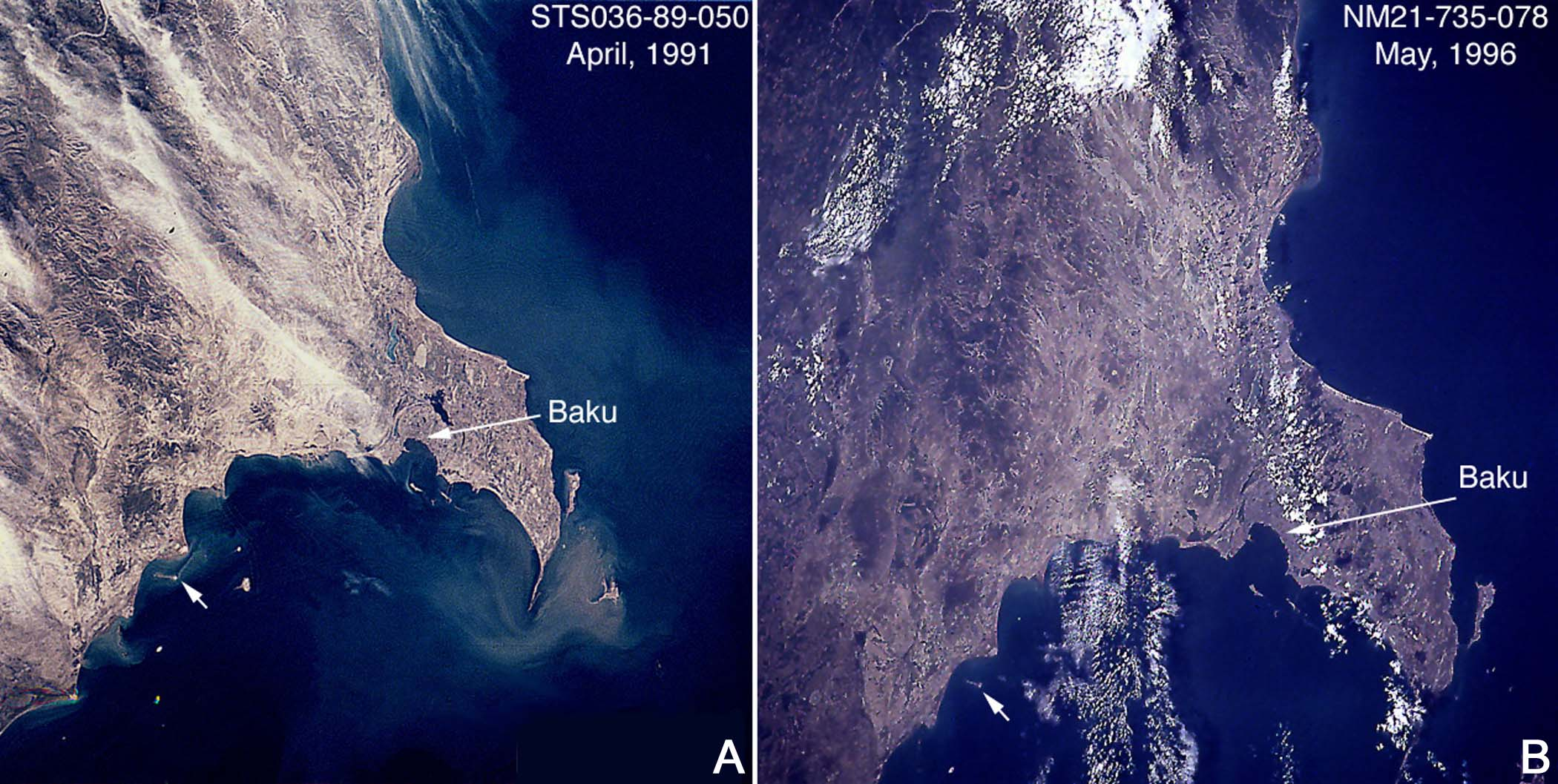
Subtle changes due to falling sea level (in the Caspian Sea) can be seen along this coastline.

Air and water pollution are widespread and pose great challenges to economic development. Major sources of pollution include oil refineries and chemical and metallurgical industries, which in the early 1990s continued to operate as inefficiently as they had in the Soviet era. Air quality is extremely poor in Baku, the center of oil refining. Some reports have described Baku's air as the most polluted in the former Soviet Union, and other industrial centers suffer similar problems.

The Caspian Sea, including Baku Bay, has been polluted by oil leakages and the dumping of raw or inadequately treated sewage, reducing the yield of caviar and fish. In the Soviet period, Azerbaijan was pressed to use extremely heavy applications of pesticides to improve its output of scarce subtropical crops for the rest of the Soviet Union. The continued regular use of the pesticide DDT in the 1970s and 1980s was an egregious lapse, although that chemical was officially banned in the Soviet Union because of its toxicity to humans. Excessive application of pesticides and chemical fertilizers has caused extensive groundwater pollution and has been linked by Azerbaijani scientists to birth defects and illnesses. Rising water levels in the Caspian Sea, mainly caused by natural factors exacerbated by man-made structures, have reversed the decades-long drying trend and now threaten coastal areas; the average level rose 1.5 meters (4.9 ft) between 1978 and 1993. Because of the Nagorno-Karabakh conflict, large numbers of trees were felled, roads were built through pristine areas, and large expanses of agricultural land were occupied by military forces.

Like other former Soviet republics, Azerbaijan faces a gigantic environmental cleanup complicated by the economic uncertainties left in the wake of the Moscow-centered planning system. The Committee for the Protection of the Natural Environment is part of the Azerbaijani government, but in the early 1990s it was ineffective at targeting critical applications of limited funds, establishing pollution standards, or monitoring compliance with environmental regulations. Early in 1994, plans called for Azerbaijan to participate in the international Caspian Sea Forum, sponsored by the European Union (EU).

Natural hazards
Droughts and floods; some lowland areas threatened by rising levels of the Caspian Sea
Environment – current issues
Local scientists consider the Abseron Yasaqligi (Apsheron Peninsula) (including Baky and Sumqayit) and the Caspian Sea to be the ecologically most devastated area in the world because of severe air, water, and soil pollution; soil pollution results from the use of DDT as a pesticide and also from toxic defoliants used in the production of cotton.
Environment – international agreements
- Party to: Air Pollution, Biodiversity, Climate Change, Desertification, Endangered Species, Hazardous Wastes, Marine Dumping, Ozone Layer Protection, Ship Pollution, Wetlands

== Area and boundaries ==
Area
- Total: 86,600 square kilometres (33,436 sq mi)
  - country rank in the world: 113th
- Land: 82,629 square kilometres (31,903 sq mi)
- Water: 3,971 square kilometres (1,533 sq mi)
- Note: Includes the exclave of Nakhchivan Autonomous Republic and the Nagorno-Karabakh region; the region's autonomy was abolished by Azerbaijani Supreme Soviet on November 26, 1991.

Area comparative
- Australia comparative: approximately 2/7 larger than Tasmania
- Canada comparative: approximately 1/5 larger than New Brunswick
- United Kingdom comparative: slightly larger than Scotland
- United States comparative: slightly smaller than Maine
- EU comparative: slightly smaller than Portugal
Land boundaries
- Total: 2,468 kilometres (1,534 mi)
- Border countries:
  - Armenia (with Azerbaijan-proper) 566 kilometres (352 mi)
  - Armenia (with Azerbaijan-Nakhchivan exclave) 221 kilometres (137 mi)
  - Georgia 428 kilometres (266 mi)
  - Iran (with Azerbaijan-proper) 432 kilometres (268 mi)
  - Iran (with Azerbaijan-Nakhchivan exclave) 700 kilometres (435 mi)
  - Russia 338 kilometres (210 mi)
  - Turkey 17 kilometres (11 mi)
Coastline

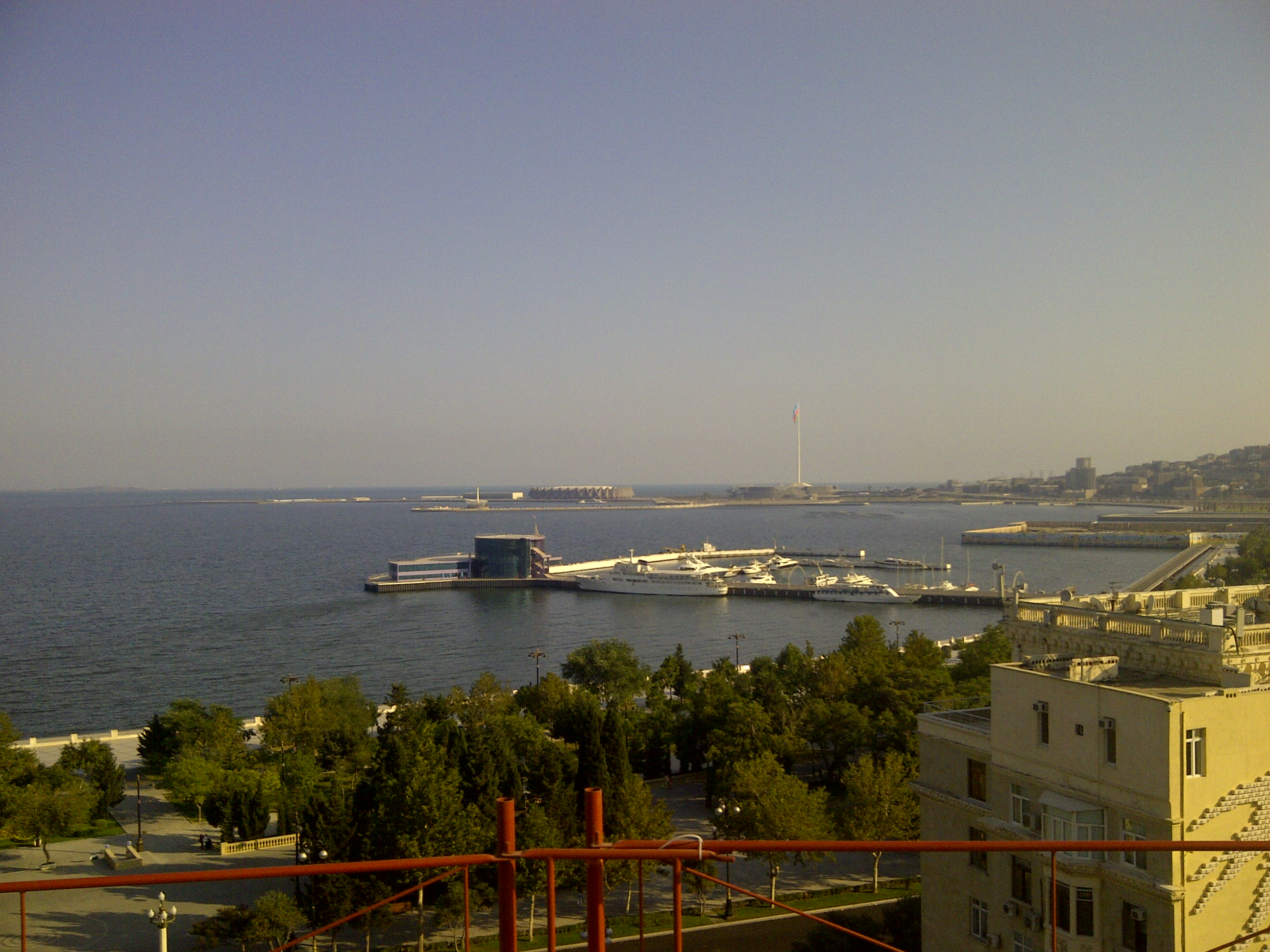
Baku and Caspian Sea

- 0 km
  - Note: Azerbaijan borders the Caspian Sea. Its coastline with the Caspian Sea is 713 kilometres (443 mi).
Maritime claims
- Border disputes with Turkmenistan, Kazakhstan, Iran, and Russia
Terrain
- large, flat lowland (much of it below sea-level) with Great Caucasus Mountains to the north, uplands in the west
Elevation extremes
- Lowest point: Caspian Sea −28 metres (−92 ft)
- Highest point: Bazardüzü 4,466 metres (14,652 ft) (on the border with Russia)
- Highest peak entirely within Azeri territory: Shah Dagi 4,243 metres (13,921 ft)

=== Islands ===
- Bulla
- Çikil
- Çilov
- Gil
- Glinyaniy
- Nargin
- Pirallahı
- Qara Su
- Qum
- Səngi Muğan
- Vulf
- Zənbil

== Resources and land use ==
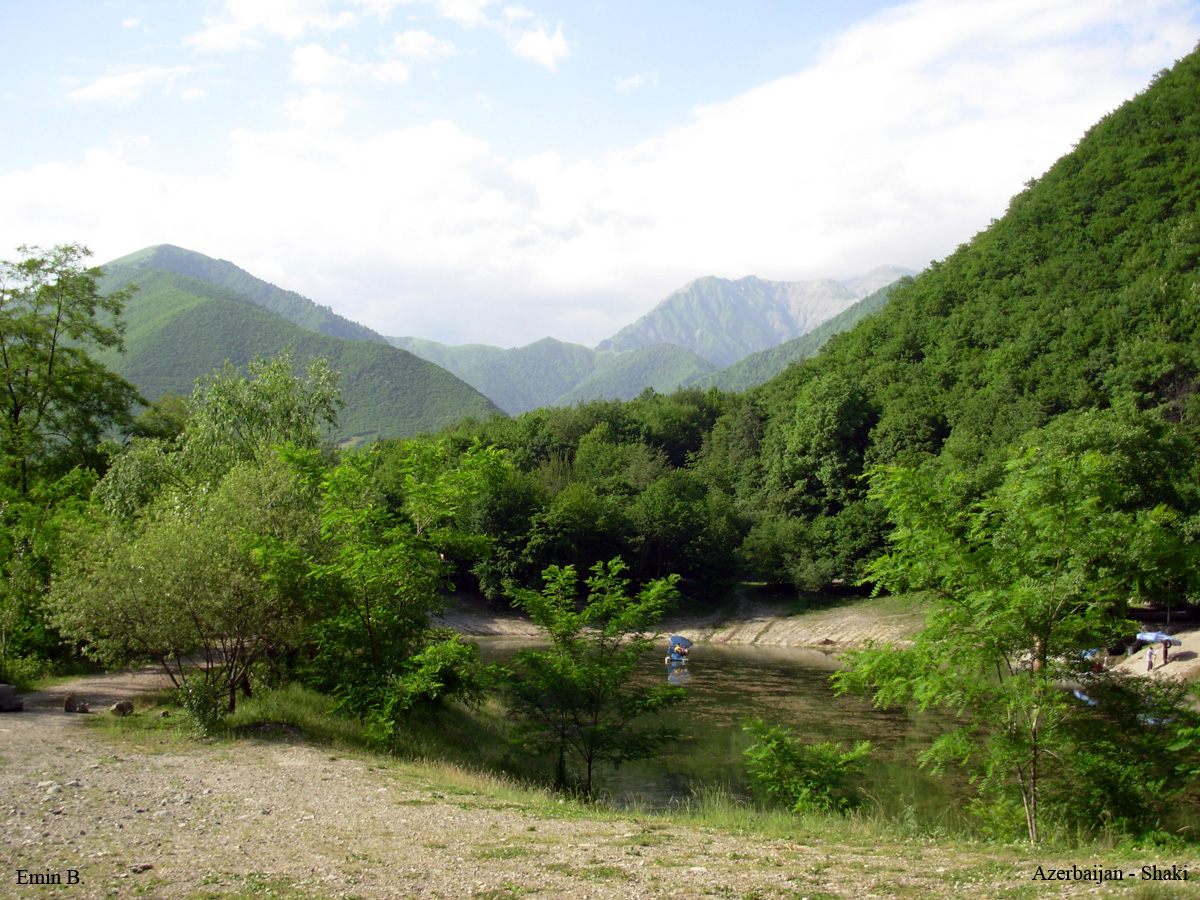
Azerbaijan Nature Shaki

Natural resources
Petroleum, natural gas, iron ore, nonferrous metals, bauxite
Land use
- Arable land: 22.95%
- Permanent crops: 2.79%
- Other: 74.26% (2012 est.)
Irrigated land
- 14,250 km² (2010)
Total renewable water resources
- 34.68 km^{3} (2011)
Freshwater withdrawal (domestic/industrial/agricultural)
- Total: 12.21 km^{3}/yr (4%/18%/78%)
- Per capita: 1,384 cu m/yr (2010)

== See also ==
- List of volcanoes in Azerbaijan
- List of islands of Azerbaijan
- Wikimedia Atlas of Azerbaijan
