= Chikil =

Coordinates: 39°38′24″N 49°26′22″E

Chikil Oblivnoy
- Island of the Baku Archipelago
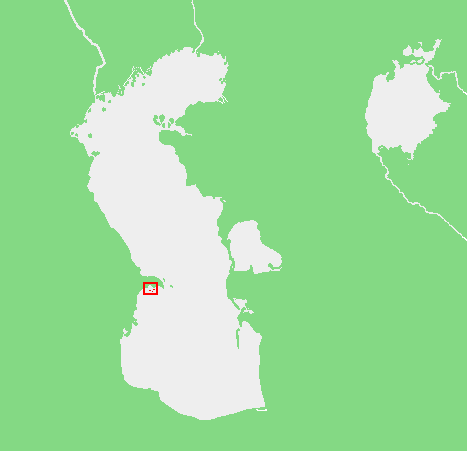
- Map showing the location of the Baku Archipelago.
- Country: Azerbaijan
- Region: Absheron Region

Area
  - Total: 0.4 km^{2} (0.15 sq mi)
- Elevation: 25 m (82 ft)

Chikil (Azerbaijani: Çigil adasi), also known as Oblivnoy, is an uninhabited island off the Bay of Baku, Azerbaijan. This island is part of the Baku Archipelago, which consists of the following islands: Boyuk Zira, Dash Zira, Qum Island or Peschanny, Zenbil, Sangi-Mugan, Chikil, Qara Su, Khara Zira, Gil, Ignat Dash and a few smaller ones.

== Ecology ==
Chikil's surrounding waters are very shallow. There is very little vegetation on the island due to oil pollution as well as other factors.

Caspian seals, sturgeon, and numerous types of birds, like teal ducks, herring gulls and grebes, are some of the animal species that can be found on and around the island.

== See also ==
- List of islands of Azerbaijan
