= Pirallahı =

Pirallahı or Pirallahi may refer to:

- Pirallahi Island, Azerbaijan, in the Caspian Sea
- Pirallahı, Baku, a village in Baku, Azerbaijan

== See also ==
- Pirallahy raion, a municipal district of Baku, Azerbaijan
- Boyuk Zira
- Vulf
- Qum Island
- Tava Island
