= Zanbil =

Zanbil Zənbil / Duvanni
- Island of the Baku Archipelago
- Location within Caspian Sea
- Coordinates: 40°2′30″N 49°35′15″E
- Country: Azerbaijan
- Region: Absheron Region

Area
  - Total: 0.4 km^{2} (0.15 sq mi)
- Elevation: 25 m (82 ft)

Zanbil (Azerbaijani: Zənbil) is a small island in the Caspian Sea off the Bay of Baku, Azerbaijan. It is also known as Duvanni Island.

== Etymology ==
The name Zanbil is Persian (زنبیل) and means "a big basket". The name "Duvanni" (Дуванный), meaning "money" in Russian, is connected to Stepan Razin.

== Geography ==
The island is part of the Baku Archipelago, located in the Ələt (Alat) municipality area, which consists of the following islands: Boyuk Zira, Dash Zira, Qum Island, Zanbil, Sangi-Mugan, Chikil, Qara Su, Khara Zira, Gil, Ignat Dash, and a few smaller ones.

The area of Zanbil Island is 0.4 km^{2}. Its length is 0.9 km and its maximum width 0.5 km. Zanbil lies 5.5 km (3.4 mi) NW of Xara Zira and the nearest shore of the mainland is about 9.5 km (5.9 mi) to the SW.

There is a 25 m high mud volcano on Zanbil.

== See also ==
- List of islands of Azerbaijan
- Petroleum industry in Azerbaijan
