= Tava Island =

Coordinates: 40°17′30″N 49°57′37″E

Tava Tava adası
- Island of the Baku Archipelago
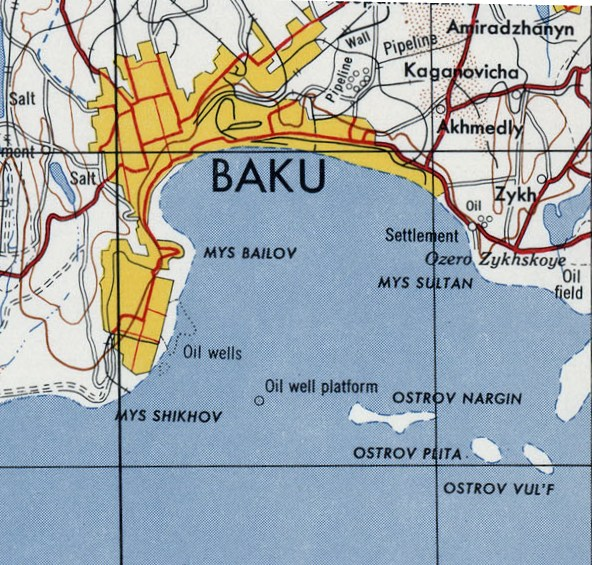
- Tava ("O. Plita") island on a 1965 topographic map
- Nickname: Plita
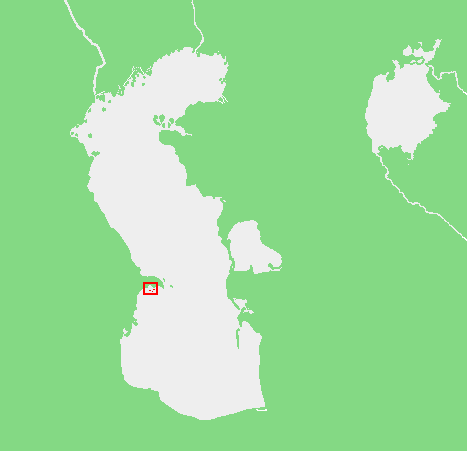
- Map showing the location of the Baku Archipelago.
- Country: Azerbaijan
- Region: Absheron Region

Tava or Plita, is an island in the Bay of Baku, Azerbaijan.

== Geography ==
It is a small island, located between Boyuk Zira and Vulf (Dash Zira).

Caspian seals, sturgeon, and numerous types of birds like teal ducks, herring gulls, and grebes are a few of the species that can be found on and around the island.

== See also ==
- List of islands of Azerbaijan
