= Qara Su =

Qara Su Los Island
- Island of the Baku Archipelago
- Location within Caspian Sea
- Coordinates: 39°50′N 49°32′E
- Country: Azerbaijan
- Region: Absheron Region

Area
  - Total: 0.6 km^{2} (0.23 sq mi)
- Elevation: 25 m (82 ft)

Qara Su, Qarasu or Los Island, is an uninhabited sandy island located south of the Bay of Baku, Azerbaijan.

The island is part of the Baku Archipelago, which includes of the following islands: Boyuk Zira or Nargin, Dash Zira, Qum Island, Zenbil, Sangi-Mugan, Chikil, Qara Su, Khara Zira, Gil, Ignat Dash, and several smaller ones.

== Geography ==
Qara Su is an island of tectonic origin. It has a length of 1,160 metres (3,806 feet), and a width of 700 metres (2,297 feet). It was formerly home to substantial gas fields on the island.

Qara Su is located approximately 8 km (5 mi) from the nearest shore, the island is surrounded by shallow waters.

== Ecology ==
There is minimal vegetation on the island due to oil pollution as well as other factors.

Qara Su Island is home to diverse wildlife, including Caspian seals, sturgeon, and various bird species such as teal ducks, herring gulls, and grebes that inhabit the island and its surrounding area.

== See also ==
- List of islands of Azerbaijan
