= Podvodnyye Islands =

Podvodnyye Qutan Adasi / Baburi Adasi
- Island group of the Baku Archipelago
- Interactive map of Podvodnyye
- Location within Caspian Sea
- Coordinates: 39°48′07″N 49°27′57″E
- Country: Azerbaijan
- Region: Absheron Region

The Podvodnyye Islands (Azerbaijani: Qutan Adası and Baburi Adasi) are a small island group off the Azerbaijan coast in the Caspian Sea.

== Geography ==
The Podvodnyye are a cluster of islets extending for about 7 km in a NW - SE direction. The group is part of the Baku Archipelago, but it lies south of the bay.

The northernmost islet is located 0.8 km from the mainland shore. The largest islet is about 2 km in length, but very narrow.

== See also ==
- List of islands of Azerbaijan
