= Nargin =

Nargin can refer to:

- Nargin (island), an island
- Nargin (programming) (number arguments in), a programming command in MATLAB indicating how many input arguments a user has supplied
- MV Nargin, a Russian coastal tanker

== See also ==
- Nargout
