= Gyzyldag =

Mountain in Azerbaijan

Coordinates: 39°22′26.7″N 45°26′50.2″E

Gyzyldag (Azerbaijani: Qızıldağ) is a mountain in Azerbaijan with a height of 1,319.1 m (4,328 ft) above sea level, in the Shahbuz district of the Nakhchivan Autonomous Republic, on the border with the Babek district.

== Geography ==
It is located 19 kilometers north-east of the city of Nakhichevan, 4 kilometers north-east of Jagri, on the right bank of the middle course of the Nakhchivanchay river, in the interfluve of Nakhchivanchay and Jagrichay.

The Khal-Khal deposit of native copper is located one kilometer to the south-east of Gyzyldag. The deposit was studied in 1961-1963 by G. Mammadov and M. Mammadov. In 1980–1981, the deposit was explored in detail by V. Nagiyev and Y. Kerimov.

== See also ==
- Geography of Azerbaijan
