= Vulf =

Coordinates: 40°17′20″N 49°58′55″E

Vulf Dash Zira / Kichik Zira
- Island of the Baku Archipelago
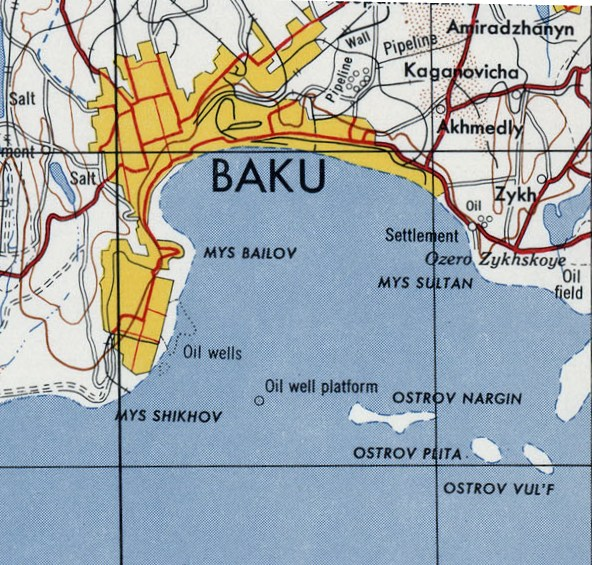
- Dash Zira ("OSTROV VUL'F") island on a 1965 topographic map

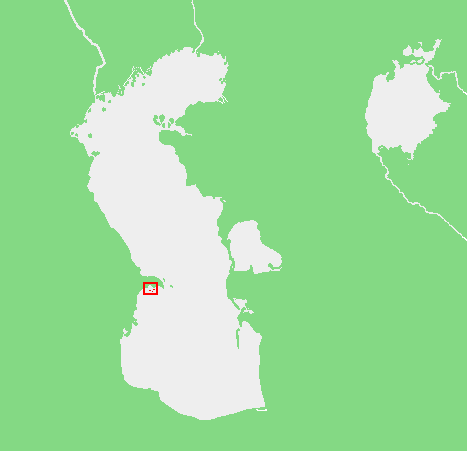
- Map showing the location of the Baku Archipelago.
- Country: Azerbaijan
- Region: Absheron Region

Area
  - Total: 0.3 km^{2} (0.12 sq mi)

Vulf, or Volf , and also known as Dash Zira (Azeri: Daş Zirə) or Kichik Zira (Kiçik Zirə), is an island of Azerbaijan, in the Caspian Sea. The word "Zira" originated in the Arabic word "Jazīra", meaning "island". Vulf is tiny and uninhabited. It is one of the many islands that protect the Bay of Baku.

== Geography ==
The island is part of the Baku Archipelago, which consists of the following islands: Boyuk Zira, Kichik Zira, Qum Island or Peschany, Zenbil, Sangi-Mugan, Chikil, Qara Su, Khara Zira, Gil, Tava (Plita), Khanlar (Ptichiy), Ignat Dash and a few smaller ones.

Vulf has an area of approximately 1 km^{2} (24.711 acres). The waters surrounding Vulf are very shallow. There is very little vegetation on Vulf, due to oil pollution as well as many other factors.

Caspian seals, sturgeon, and numerous types of birds like teal ducks, herring gulls, and grebes are a few of the species that can be found on and around the island.

== See also ==
- List of islands of Azerbaijan
