= Kura Rock =

Kura Rock Kür daşı
- Island
- Location within Azerbaijan
- Coordinates: 39°0′54″N 49°20′01″E
- Country: Azerbaijan
- Region: Aran Region

Kura Rock or Kura Stone (Russian: Куринский Камень, Kurinskiy Kamen; Azerbaijani: Kür daşı), is an islet off the coast of Azerbaijan.

== Geography ==
Kura Rock is a small islet with a maximum length of 0.18 km. It is located 13 km to the east of Kura Island's northeastern end and about 15 km (9 mi) to the southeast of the nearest mainland shore. The Borisova Bank is located to the west of this islet.

Although quite far from Baku, this islet is considered part of the Baku Archipelago. Administratively it belongs to the Aran Region.

== See also ==
- List of islands of Azerbaijan
- Fedor Ivanovich Soimonov
