= List of islands of Azerbaijan =

Regions of Azerbaijan

Azerbaijan has many islands along the coast of the Caspian Sea. Most are part of the Baku Archipelago.

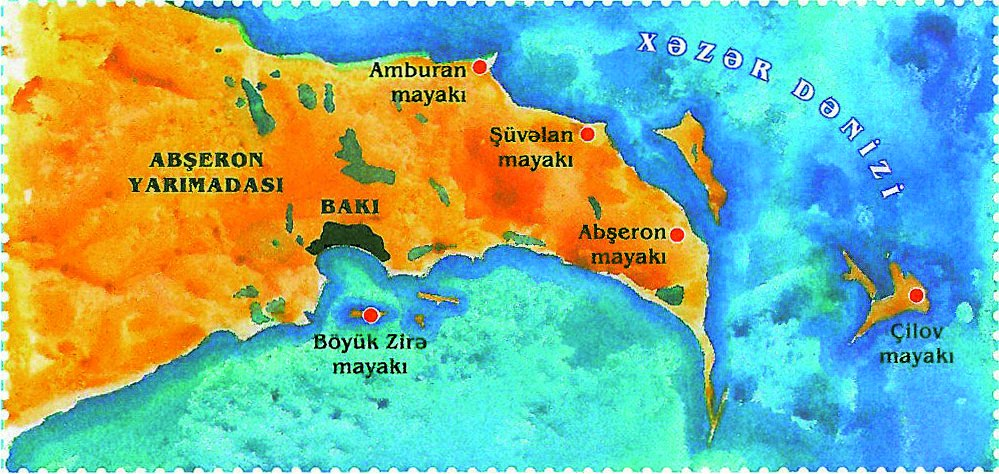
Map of Baku Islands

== Baku Archipelago ==
- Boyuk Zira or Nargin 40°17′38″N 49°55′18″E
- Kicik Zirə or Vulf
- Qum Island or Peschany
- Tava Island or Plita

=== Islands located off the bay ===
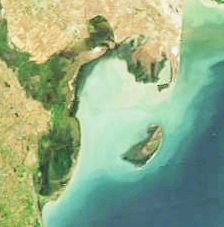
Kura Island

These islands are detached from the main group:

- Dashli ada 39°37′13″N 49°42′43″E
- Sangi Mugan or Svinoy 39°45′N 49°35′E
- Zenbil or Duvanni 40°2′30″N 49°35′15″E
- Chikil or Oblivnoy
- Qara Su or Los 39°50′N 49°32′E
- Xara Zira or Bulla 39°59′39″N 49°38′35″E
- Qutan and Baburi Islands or Podvodnyye
- Adsiz Ada, Dasli Ada or Bezymyannyy 39°43′30″N 49°37′30″E
- Gil or Glinyanyy 39°56′53″N 49°28′58″E
- Kura Island or Kurinsky 38°58′30″N 49°07′30″E
- Kura Rock or Kurinsky Kamen 39°0′54″N 49°20′01″E
- Sara Peninsula

== Not in Baku Archipelago ==
- Chilov 40°20′N 50°35′E
- Pirallahi Island 40.4667°N 50.3167°E

== Artificial Islands ==
- Khazar Islands 40.24134°N 49.634242°E
- Neft Daşları 40°14′10″N 50°51′30″E

== See also ==
- Category:Islands of the Caspian Sea
- Lists of islands
