= Kura Island =

Island in Aran Region, Azerbaijan

Azerbaijani: Kür dili
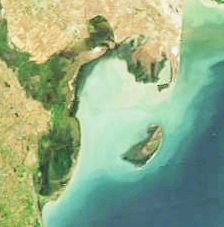
- Kura Island off Kyzylagach Bay.

- Location in the Caspian Sea

Geography
- Location: Caspian Sea
- Coordinates: 38°58′30″N 49°07′30″E
- Archipelago: Baku Archipelago
- Area: 44 km^{2} (17 sq mi)
- Length: 11.8 km (7.33 mi)
- Width: 5.2 km (3.23 mi)
- Highest elevation: 6 m (20 ft)

Administration
- Azerbaijan
- Region: Aran Region

Demographics
- Population: 0 (2021)

Kura or Kurkosa (Azerbaijani: Kür dili), also known as Kurinskiy in the Russian language, is the largest island of Azerbaijan. It lies in the Caspian Sea, off the coast of the Aran Region, 33 kilometers (21 mi) to the south of Neftchala and about 150 kilometers (93 mi) to the SSE of Baku.

== History ==
The island was formerly attached to the mainland by a narrow spit. It was named Kurkosa after the Kura River located further north by Fyodor Soimonov, the pioneering explorer of the Caspian Sea during the time of Peter I the Great. Soimonov wrote the 'Pilot of the Caspian Sea,' the first report on that until then little known body of water, that was published in 1720 by the Russian Academy of Sciences.

In Soviet times there were two villages on the island with a population of almost 3,000 souls. However, the rise of the Caspian Sea level cut Kura Island off from the mainland, making communication problematic. As a result, in 1981 most inhabitants were evacuated. By 2009 only about 10 people lived on Kura Island. The last inhabitant of the island died in 2020.

== Geography ==
Kura Island is located 7.5 kilometers (4.7 mi) off the Kura Spit, the nearest point, and 10 kilometers (6.2 mi) to the east of the Kyzylagach Bay (Qızılağac Bay) shore. Although located quite far away from it, it is considered the southernmost island of the Baku Archipelago.

The area of Kura Island is 43 square kilometers (17 sq mi). Its length is 11.8 kilometers (7.3 mi) and its maximum width 5.2 kilometers (3.2 mi). The island is low, with mudhills, and stretches in a NE to SW direction.

There is a lighthouse on Kura that was built in 1911 and abandoned in 1966.

=== Kura Stone ===
Kura Rock or Kura Stone (Kurinskiy Kamen), Azerbaijani: Kür daşı, is a small islet with a maximum length of 0.18 km. It is located 13 km to the east of Kura Island's NE end at 39°00′54″N 49°20′01″E.

== See also ==
- Ghizil-Agaj State Reserve
- List of islands of Azerbaijan
