= Baku Archipelago =

Group of islands near Baku, Azerbaijan

Azerbaijani: Bakı arxipelaqı
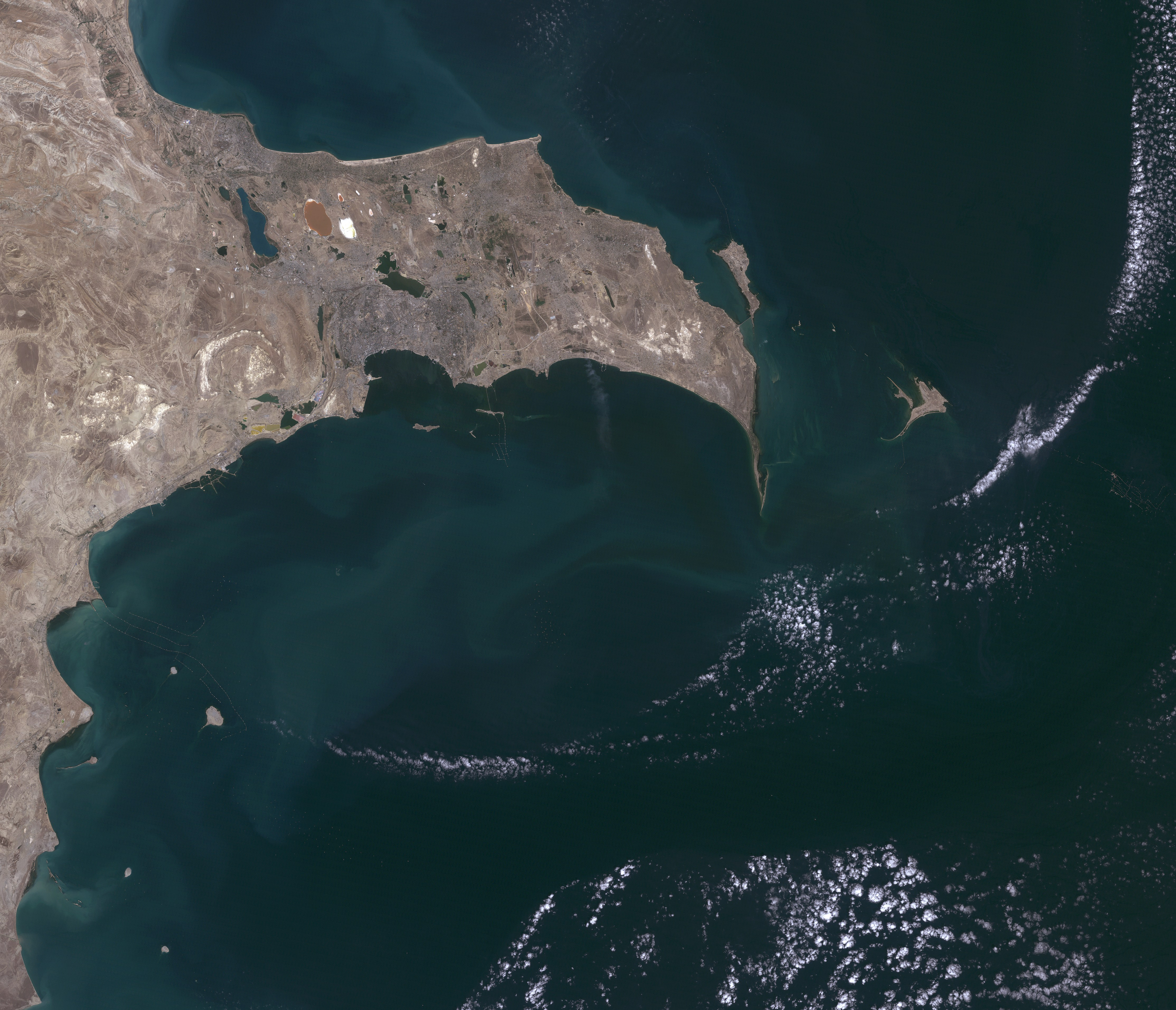
- LandSat satellite image of Greater Baku showing the islands

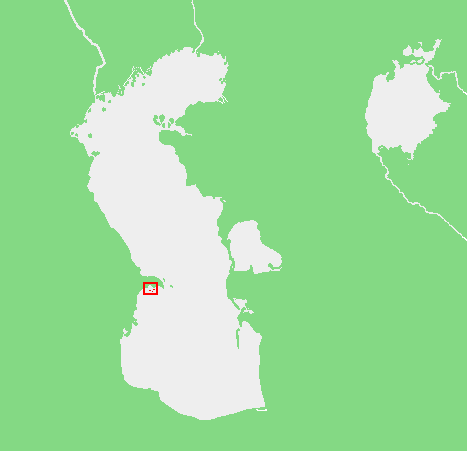
- Location of the Baku Archipelago in the Caspian Sea

Geography
- Location: Caspian Sea,
- Coordinates: 40°17′N 49°58′E

Administration
- Azerbaijan

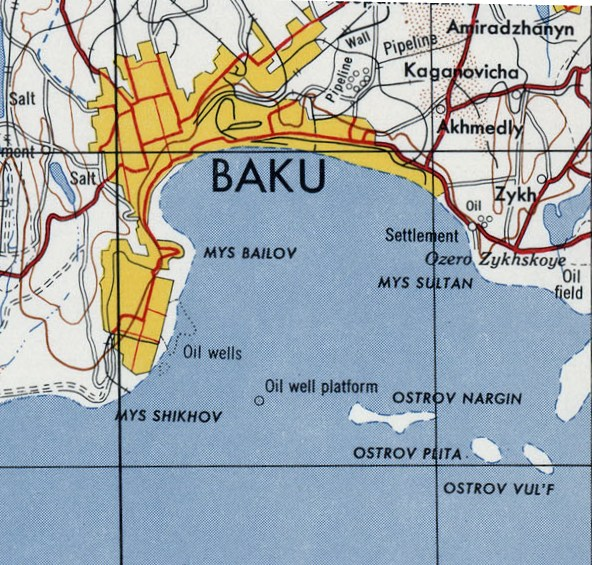
Nargin Island, Vulf Island, etc. on a topographic map. (U.S. Army Map Service) 1954

The Baku Archipelago is a group of coastal islands close to Baku, Azerbaijan. The waters surrounding the islands are shallow.

== Islands ==
Besides their Azeri name, most islands have a Russian name that originated in the first modern cartography of the Caspian Sea made by hydrographer Fedor I. Soimonov in the 18th century. The archipelago is made up of the following islands, in addition to a few small sandbanks.

=== Islands located in the bay ===
These are the islands within the Bay of Baku perimeter:

- Boyuk Zira or Nargin
- Dash Zira or Vulf
- Qum or Peschanniy
- Tava or Plita

=== Islands located off the bay ===
These islands are detached from the main group:

- Chilov or Zhiloy
- Sangi-Mugan or Svinoy
- Zanbil or Duvanni
- Chikil or Oblivnoy
- Qara Su or Los
- Xara Zira or Bulla
- Qutan and Baburi (the Podvodnyye Islands)
- Adsiz Ada or Bezymyannyy
- Gil or Glinyanii
- Kura Island or Kurinsky
- Kura Rock or Kurinsky Kamen

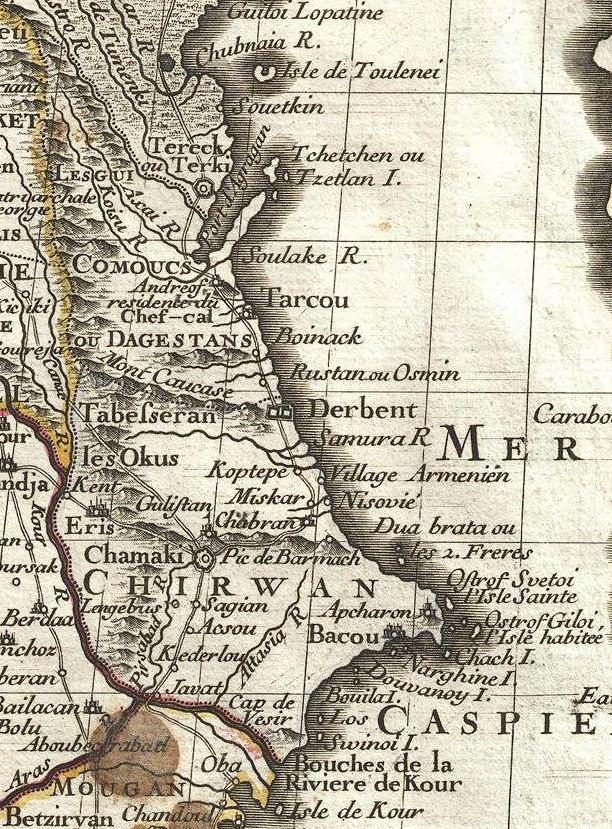
A section of the Western coast of the Caspian in a 1724 French map with the Baku Archipelago in the southern part.

== Ecology ==
The vegetation of the islands in the Baku Archipelago has been quite damaged by the pollution caused by the oil wells in the same bay, so that most islands are almost devoid of vegetation.

Formerly this archipelago provided an ideal ecosystem for the Caspian seal. Sturgeons are still found where the waters are not too polluted. Certain birds that visit Baku Bay, like teal ducks, herring gulls, and grebes find refuge in these islands that are uninhabited except for gas-extraction installations and a lighthouse. There is an automatic monitoring station for water pollution in the area located in Svinoy Island.

== Tourism ==
Lately, tourism has been intensively developing in the Baku Archipelago. The Boyuk Zira island, of the islands located offshore of Baku, Azerbaijan’s capital, is on its way to a major expansion. The island will be divided into several areas; a park, a residential area, a military port, etc. The park will be fragmented from the other areas, as its areas are subjected to strong winds. Baku is famous for its Old City, and to commemorate this, old style house will be built within the town’s fortress. When it comes to religions, Azerbaijan is known as one of the most tolerant countries in the world. A mosque, a church, and a synagogue are planned to be built. During the reign of the Soviet Union, Boyuk Zira has been known as a place where the Stalin’s prisoners were sent - to pay tribute to this, a common grave is set to be placed. Moreover, a mall, a school, and a clinic should be functioning on the island. Public events, such as summits, are projected to take place on the island. To ensure these, different venues, including clubs and entertainment events, are planned to take place on the other side of island, so that the residents will not be disturbed. This project has interested a lot of foreign investors, and a total of two to three billion manat ($255 000 000 - $382 000 000) has been set to implement this.

== Construction and modernization ==
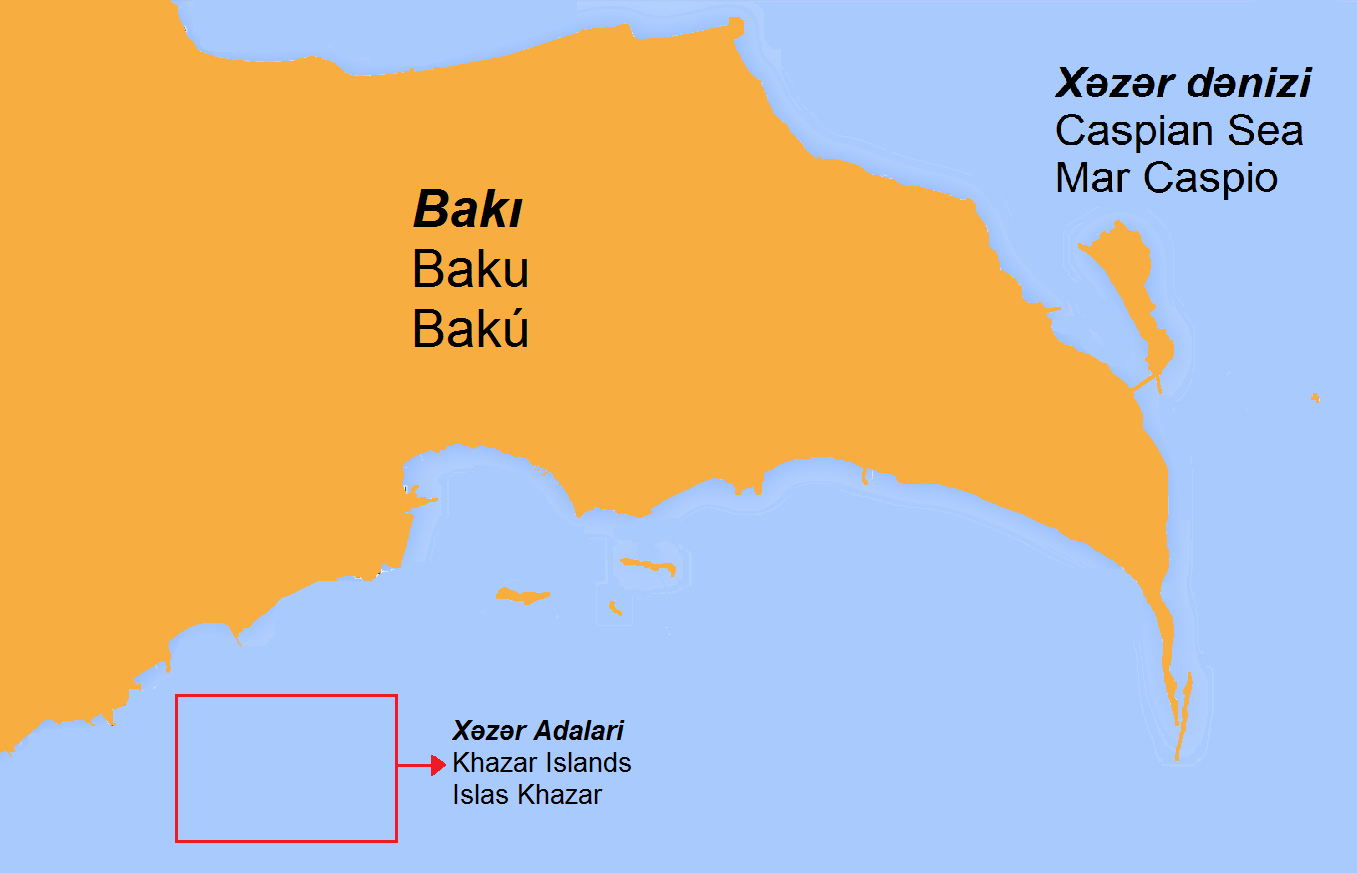
Future location of the Khazar Islands

The Khazar Islands are a planned development of artificial islands 25 km (16 mi) south of Baku.

According to Avesta management a new Azerbaijan Tower will be 200 m higher than the current tallest building in the world, the Burj Khalifa. Besides business buildings and hotels, the project also promises to provide houses in capacity of 800.000 for its residents. According to Avesta, the project is planned to be completed by the period between 2020-2025, but as of 2023, progress seems to have been halted.

== See also ==
- List of islands of Azerbaijan
