= Boyuk Zira =

Boyuk Zira Böyük Zirə adası
- Island of the Baku Archipelago
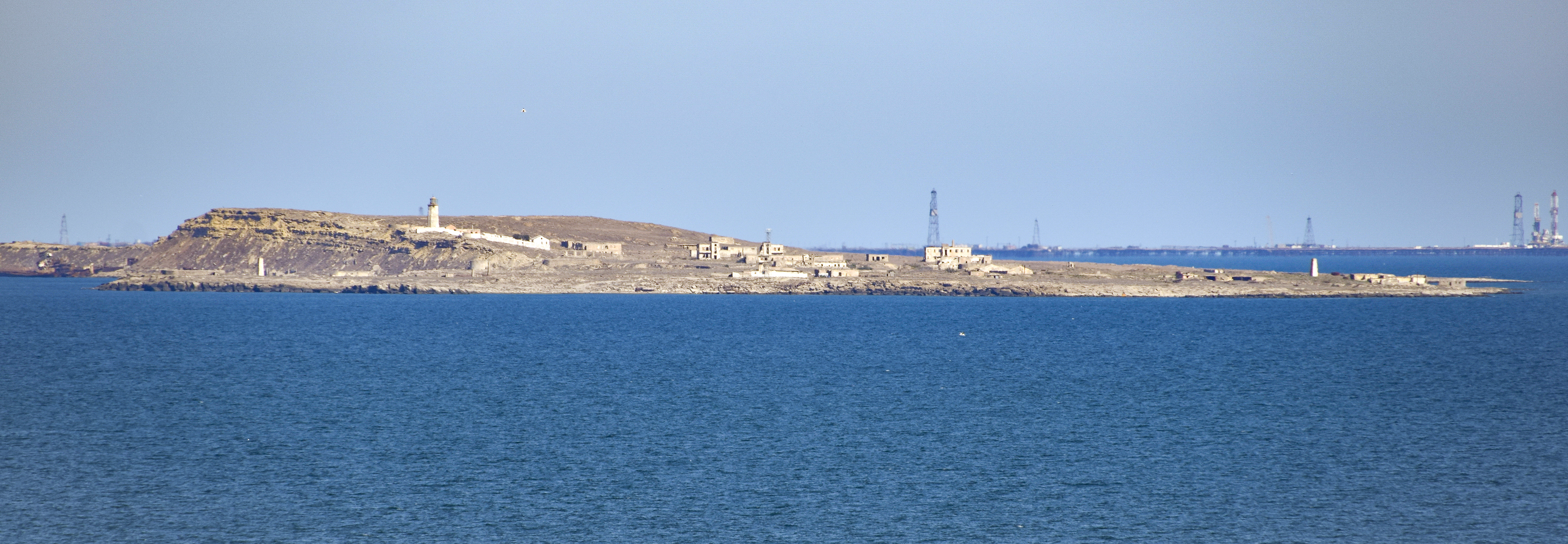
- Island of Boyuk Zira Island in 2018

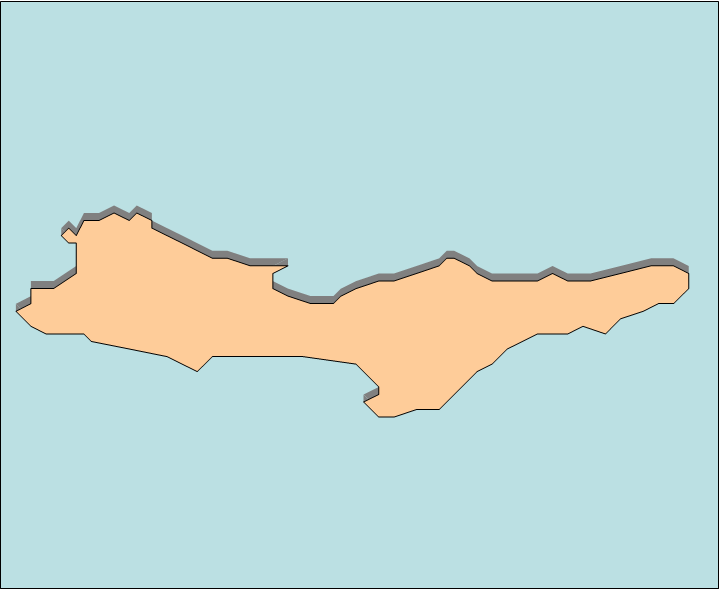

- Location within Caspian Sea
- Coordinates: 40°17′38″N 49°55′18″E
- Country: Azerbaijan
- Region: Absheron Region
- Province: Baku

Area
  - Total: 1.3 km^{2} (0.50 sq mi)

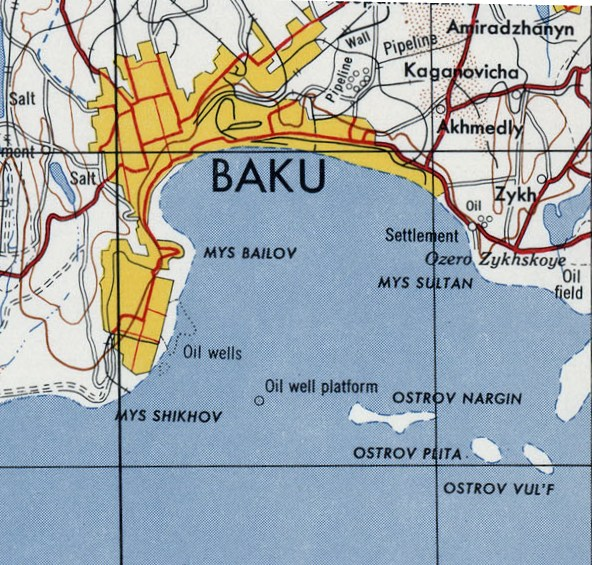
Boyuk Zira island on a 1965 topographic map.

Boyuk Zira (Böyük Zirə), also known as Nargin, is an island located in the Caspian Sea. It is one of the islands of Baku Archipelago located in the Baku bay near Baku city. Nargin Island is part of the Baku Archipelago, which consists of the following islands: Boyuk Zira, Dash Zira, Qum Island, Zenbil, Sangi-Mugan, Chikil, Qara Su, Khara Zira, Gil, Ignat Dash and a few smaller ones.

Boyuk Zira is the biggest island that separates the Bay of Baku from the sea south of the Absheron Peninsula. It has a length of 3.1 km, and a width of 900 m. The northwestern side of the island is vertical and steep. There is little vegetation.

Caspian seals, sturgeon, and numerous types of birds, such as teal ducks, herring gulls, and grebes are some of the species that can be found on and around Boyuk Zira Island.

== Toponym ==
A modern name of the island is “Boyuk Zira”, which was also its initial name, and it is originated from the merging of two words – “boyuk” means “big” in Azerbaijani and “jazira” means “island” in Arabic.

Most of the names of islands in the Baku archipelago, including Boyuk Zira, were changed by the Russians and partially by Cossacks, who appeared in the Caspian Sea region in the 17th century. Boyuk Zira was also called Nargin, which is related to the name given by Peter the Great. The shape of this island reminded the Russian emperor of the island Nargen (now Naissaar) near Tallinn in the Gulf of Finland. German “Nargen” and Estonian “Nartingen” mean a “narrow strait”. In 1990, Nargin Island reverted to its indigenous name.

== Strategic significance ==
Boyuk Zira Island, located in the Caspian Sea, 5 km directly offshore from Baku port, is strategically significant for Azerbaijan and is under the authority of the Ministry of Defence of the Republic of Azerbaijan. The island is stony. In January, 2008 SOCAR finished construction of a 17 km long, 12–14 meters deep water line extending from Lökbatan township to Boyuk Zira Island.

== History ==
=== Beacon ===
A beacon on the island began to function on December 11, 1884. The beacon was constructed on the southern part of the island and provided ships with an opportunity to enter Baku Bay at night. The beacon is a stone residential building with a three-meter tower on a roof, along with a lamp. A kerosene-wick burner, and then a gas lamp with a light-optic apparatus of the 4th degree, which was specially produced in Sweden, illuminates the way for ships.

In 1941, because of the beginning of the Great Patriotic War, the beacon building was blown up by order of the Soviet Military Command. Anti-aircraft guns were established on the island to defend Baku from German air raids, because the beacon building was a potential landmark for German aviators. The beacon was restored in 1958 and still functions. An 18m stone tower equipped with a complex optical-navigational system was built on the elevated middle part of the island. Servicing of the way is carried out by a watching method and personnel are changed every two weeks. The beacon's light can be seen 20–30 km from Baku. The beacon's power is provided by solar batteries, which give a charge of up to 7 days, and also by a diesel generator.

=== World War I ===
Nargin Island was the scene of tragic events in the history of Azerbaijan and Turkey during World War I. About ten thousand soldiers and civilians, (Turks, partially Germans and Austrians) who were captured in 1914-1915 in Turkey during the occupation of Eastern Anatolia by the Russian army and held in captivity on the island. The captives died of starvation, snake bites, and murder and torture by prison guards. Few prisoners managed to escape the island. According to Hasan Cüneyt Zapsu, a deputy and counselor of the Cabinet of Ministers of Turkey, his grandfather Abdurrahim Rahmi Zapsu was imprisoned on Nargin Island and escaped with the help of a nurse. Vecihi Hürkuş – a Turkish veteran pilot and aviation pioneer – also escaped from the island with the assistance of residents, and a film dedicated to him is intended to be shot in Turkey.

A documentary exposing the tragedy Turkish soldiers endured in Nargin island in the early 20th century was shot by order of the Ministry of Culture and Tourism of Turkey. Archive documents and scenes of those years, and also memories of 11 Turkish soldiers, who were in camps in Nargin Island and returned to the motherland alive, were used in the film called Hellish Nargin Island. Recently, the erection of a monument on Nargin Island to the perished Turkish soldiers has been frequently proposed by Turhan Çömez, a former deputy of the Grand National Assembly of Turkey, and others.

=== Victims of repressions ===
Nargin Island was called the Azerbaijani gulag during the Stalin-era repression. It was the place of mass shootings and burials of Stalin-Beria terror victims, who were taken there in barges. Ten thousand people condemned by judicial communist “trios” were shot on the island, far from witnesses. Sometimes, barges full of people were sunk to save ammunition. According to scuba divers, there are still remains of people, tortured by the Soviet regime, tied with chains under water.

== Development plans ==
In 2009 a plan was mooted for turning Boyuk Zira Island into a carbon-neutral eco-resort and recreation centre with a profile based on Azerbaijan's seven best-known peaks. The cost of the project, known as “The dream island”, by Danish architects Bjarke Ingels Group (BIG), would have been around two billion US dollars. But as of 2024 there is no sign of the project advancing.

== Panoramic view ==
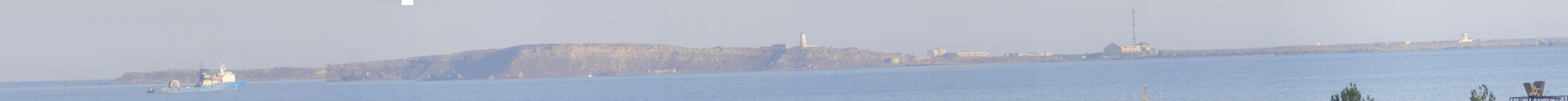
Panoramic views of Boyuk Zira Island.

== Places of interest ==
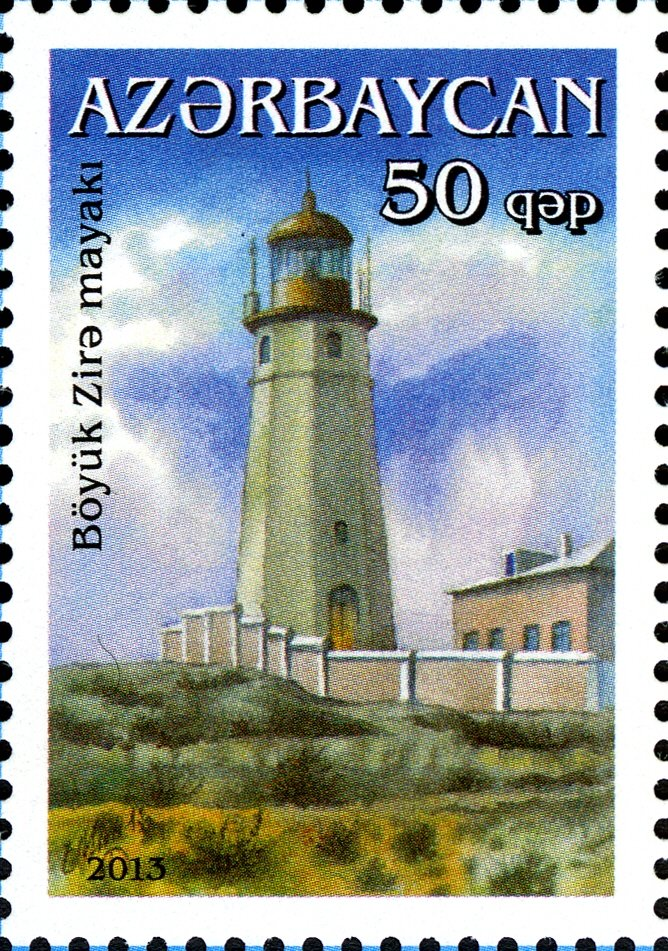
Boyuk Zira Lighthouse on stamp of Azerbaijan, 2013

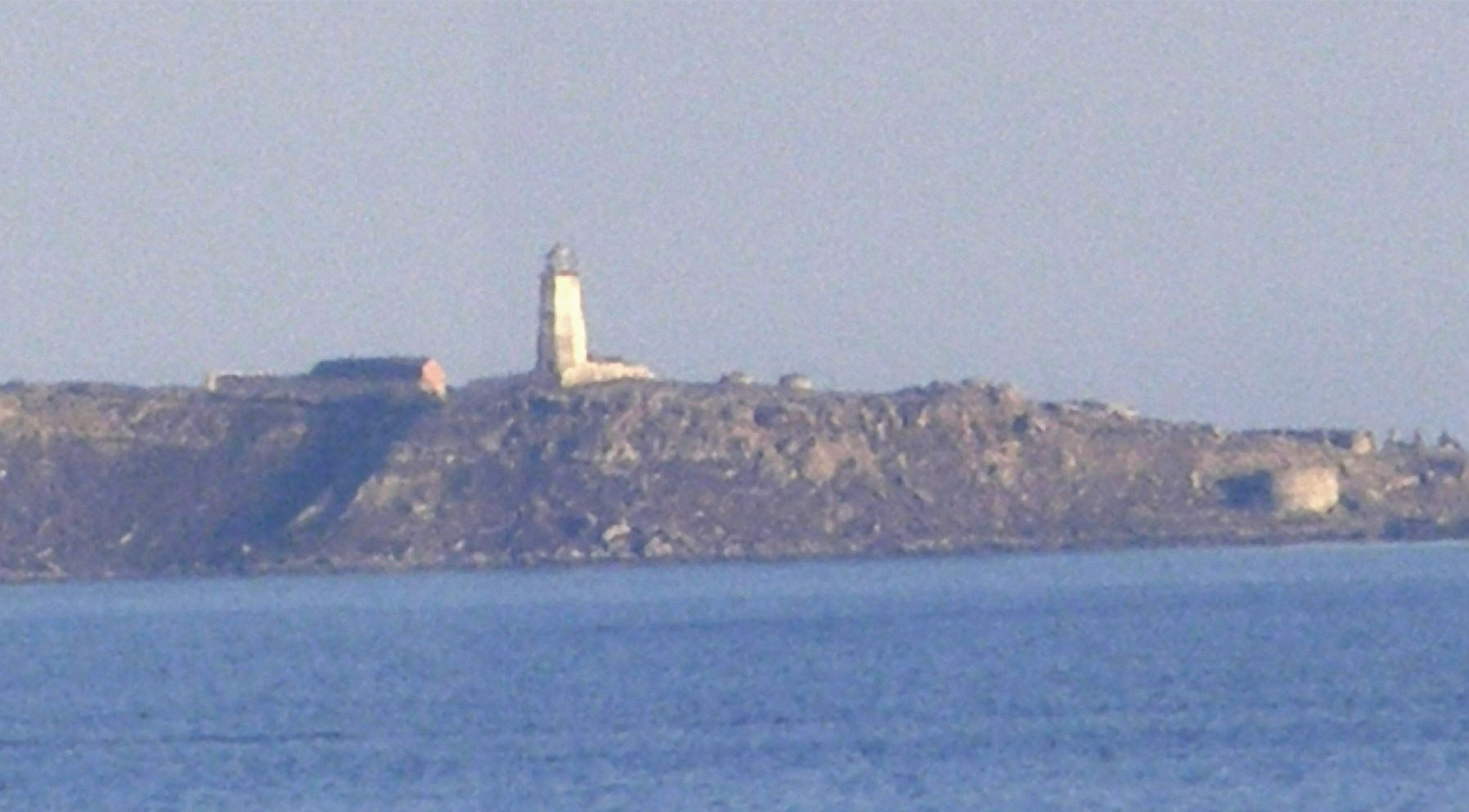
Boyuk Zira

The Boyuk Zira Lighthouse on the island began to function in 1884. It illuminated road for ships entering Bay of Baku. Until 1907, Maiden Tower executed these functions. But later, Nargin Island, detaching Baku Bay from the sea, became the main guide for sailors. A kerosene-wick burner, and then a gas lantern with a light-optic apparatus of the 4th degree illuminated a road for ships. The Nargin lighthouse, illuminated by acetylene in 1912, became the first lighthouse in the Russian Empire illuminated in such a way.

== See also ==
- List of islands of Azerbaijan
