= Adsiz Ada =

Adsız ada Daşlı Ada / Bezymyannyy
- Island
- Interactive map of Adsız ada
- Location within Caspian Sea
- Coordinates: 39°43′30″N 49°37′30″E
- Country: Azerbaijan
- Region: Absheron Region

Adsiz Ada or Dasli Ada (Russian: Bezymyannyy), is an islet off the coast of Azerbaijan.

== Details ==
Adsiz Ada (literally in Azerbaijani: “Nameless Island”) is small islet with a maximum length of 0.1 km. It is located 4.5 km to the southeast of Sangi Mugan's southeastern end and about 17.5 km (11 mi) to the east of the nearest mainland shore. Some isolated small rocks are scattered to the east and northeast of this islet.

Although geographically quite far from Baku, this islet is considered part of the Baku Archipelago.

== See also ==
- List of islands of Azerbaijan
