= Gil Island (Azerbaijan) =

Gil Gil Adasi / Glinyanyy
- Island of the Baku Archipelago
- Location within Caspian Sea
- Coordinates: 39°56′53″N 49°28′58″E
- Country: Azerbaijan
- Municipality: Alat

Gil Island, also Glinyanii Island (Azerbaijani: Gil Adası, Russian: остров Глиняный Ostrov Glinyanyy) is an island of Azerbaijan in the Caspian Sea.

== Geography ==
This island is part of the Baku Archipelago, which consists of the following islands: Boyuk Zira, Dash Zira, Qum Island, Zenbil, Sangi-Mugan or Svinoy, Chikil, Qara Su, Khara Zira, Gil, Ignat Dash, and a few smaller ones.

It lies south of the bay, detached from the group, close to the town of Alat, about 2 km from the nearest shore. Gil Island is about 1 km in length and 0.8 km wide. Gil Island has a long spit extending roughly westward.

== See also ==
- List of islands of Azerbaijan
