= Shikhov Beach =

Beach in Azerbaijan

Coordinates: 40.3069444°N 49.8208333°E

Shikhov Beach (Azeri: Şıxov çimərliyi) is a resort area with a beach in Shikhov, southwest of central Baku, the capital city of Azerbaijan, and adjacent to the Shikhov Cape.

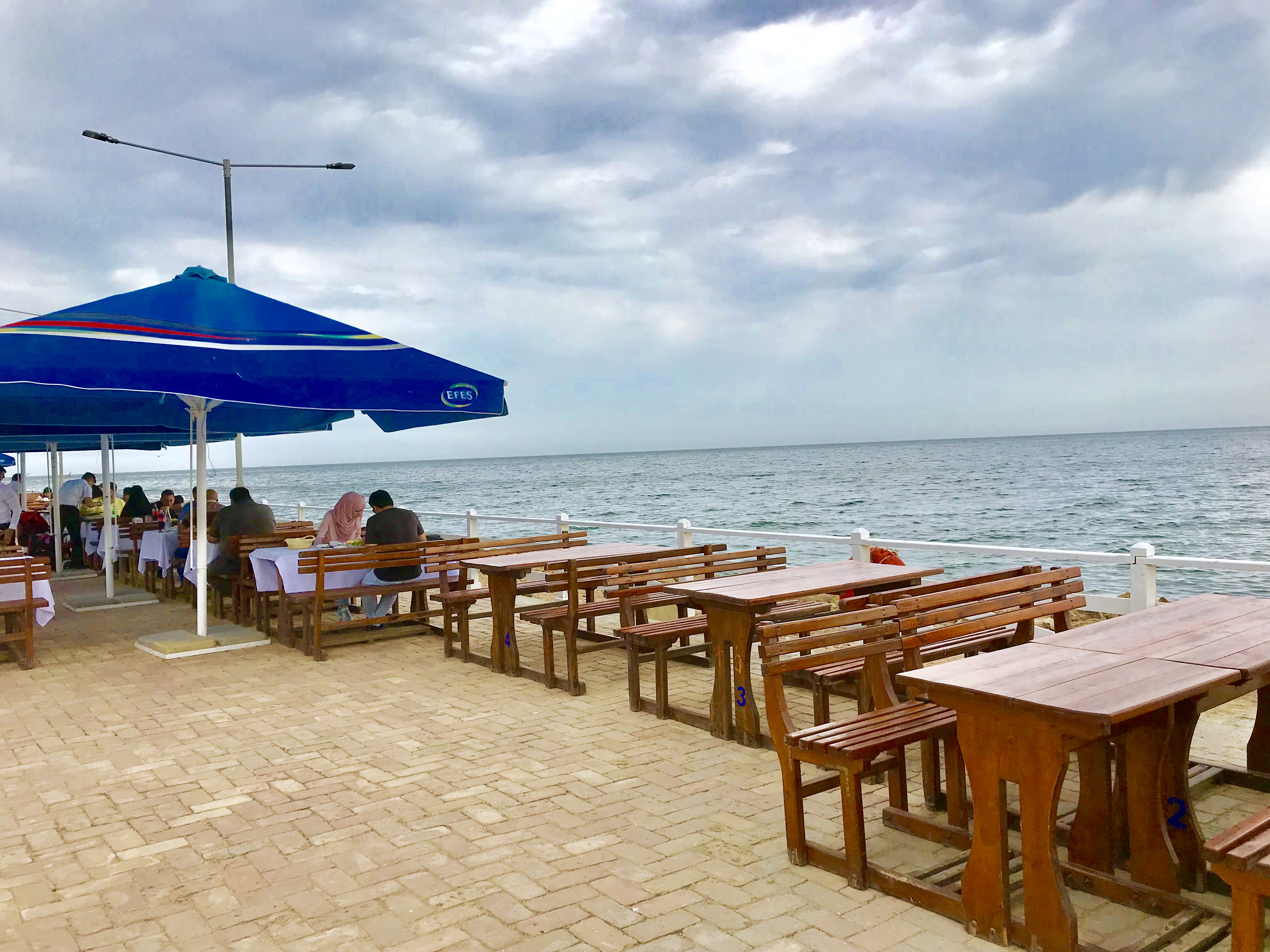
One of the Sea Food Restaurants in the area

Lying on the Caspian Sea coast, it is politically part of the Baku city-subdivision and treated as a suburb. The beach has been a traditional retreat for Baku residents, though the water is polluted by sewage and industrial waste and the view is marred by large oil rigs both in the surrounding land area and offshore.
