= Bay of Baku =

Harbor in Baku, Azerbaijan

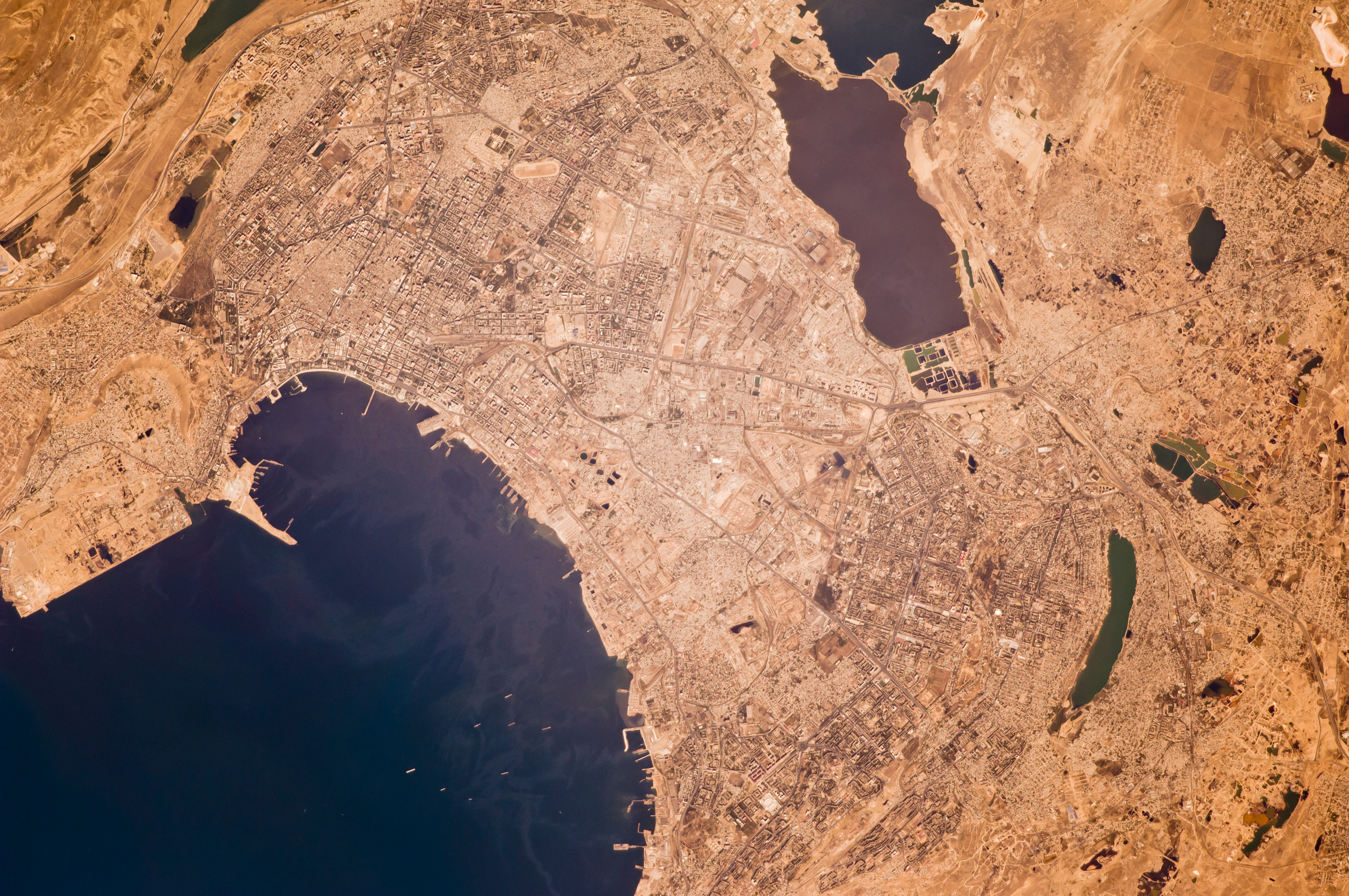

- Location within Azerbaijan
- Coordinates: 40.335611°N 49.844091°E
- Max. width: 15 km (9.3 mi)
- Surface area: 50 km^{2} (19.3 sq mi)
- Average depth: 4 m (13.1 ft)
- Water volume: 0.7 km^{3} (0.2 cu mi)
- Shore length^{1}: 20 km (12.4 mi)
- Settlements: Baku
- ^{1} Shore length is not a well-defined measure.

Bay of Baku (Baku Bay) is a natural harbor of the Baku port and local yacht club, on the southern shore of the Absheron Peninsula and on the western shore of the Caspian Sea.

== Description ==
It has an area of 50 km^{2} and a coastline of 20 km. The bay is bordered by Sultan Cape in the east, Shikh Cape on the south-west and the islands of Qum, Dash Zira and Boyuk Zira in the south and south-east. These islands are part of the Baku Archipelago which lies mostly within the bay. These characteristics make it an ideal place for a harbor. There lies Baku Boulevard on the seashore. During severe storms with high winds, the height of the waves in the bay can reach 1–5 m.

== History ==
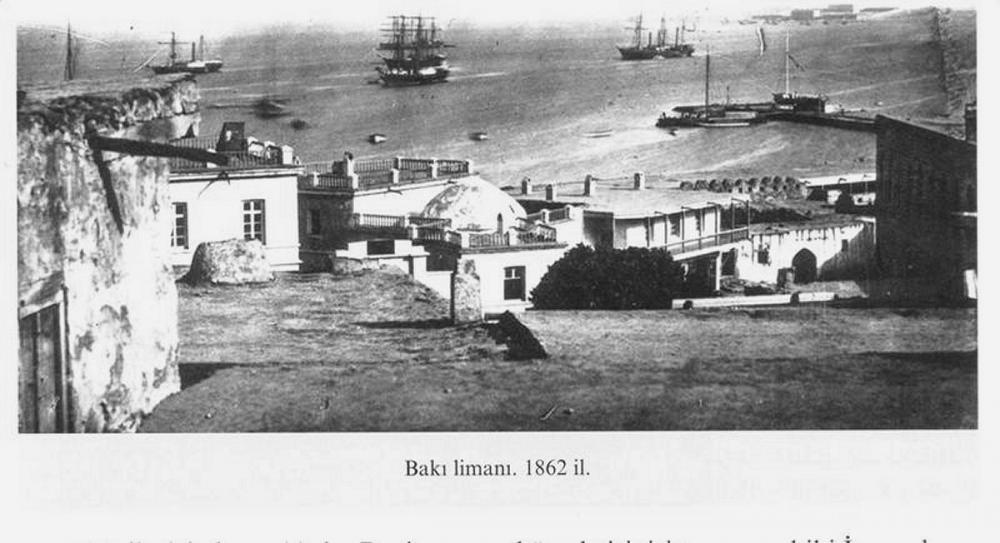
A view to the bay from Icheri Sheher (1862)

From the 1st century AD till the 7th century, Baku bay was dry and the islands in the bay joined the land. In Ptolemy's map, Baku was described far from the sea. After the 7th century, the water level of the Caspian Sea rose until the 9th century and since then, the formation of Baku bay began. Severe changes happened at the end of the 8th century, when the Caspian Sea rose more than ten meters. A major earthquake occurred in 1306, the Sabayil Castle, built on an island in the Bay of Baku, was submerged and remained underwater for several centuries. It was only in the early 18th century, when the Caspian Sea retreated, that the island resurfaced. Mario Sanuto, an Italian geographer of the 14th century sadly noted that: "Water level of the Caspian Sea rises each year and most cities have flooded.", and according to words of Abd ar-Rashid al-Bakuvi, the geographer, in 1403 the Caspian Sea flooded the part of Baku and water stood near a mosque. At that time the sea was waving near the foot of the Maiden Tower, which confirms a legend about a girl, who threw herself from the top of the tower. At that time Sabayil Castle, which was built on the rock in Baku bay, was totally located underwater. During the next 600 years, the level of the sea was hesitatingly stood high till the beginning of the 20th century when it began to sink.

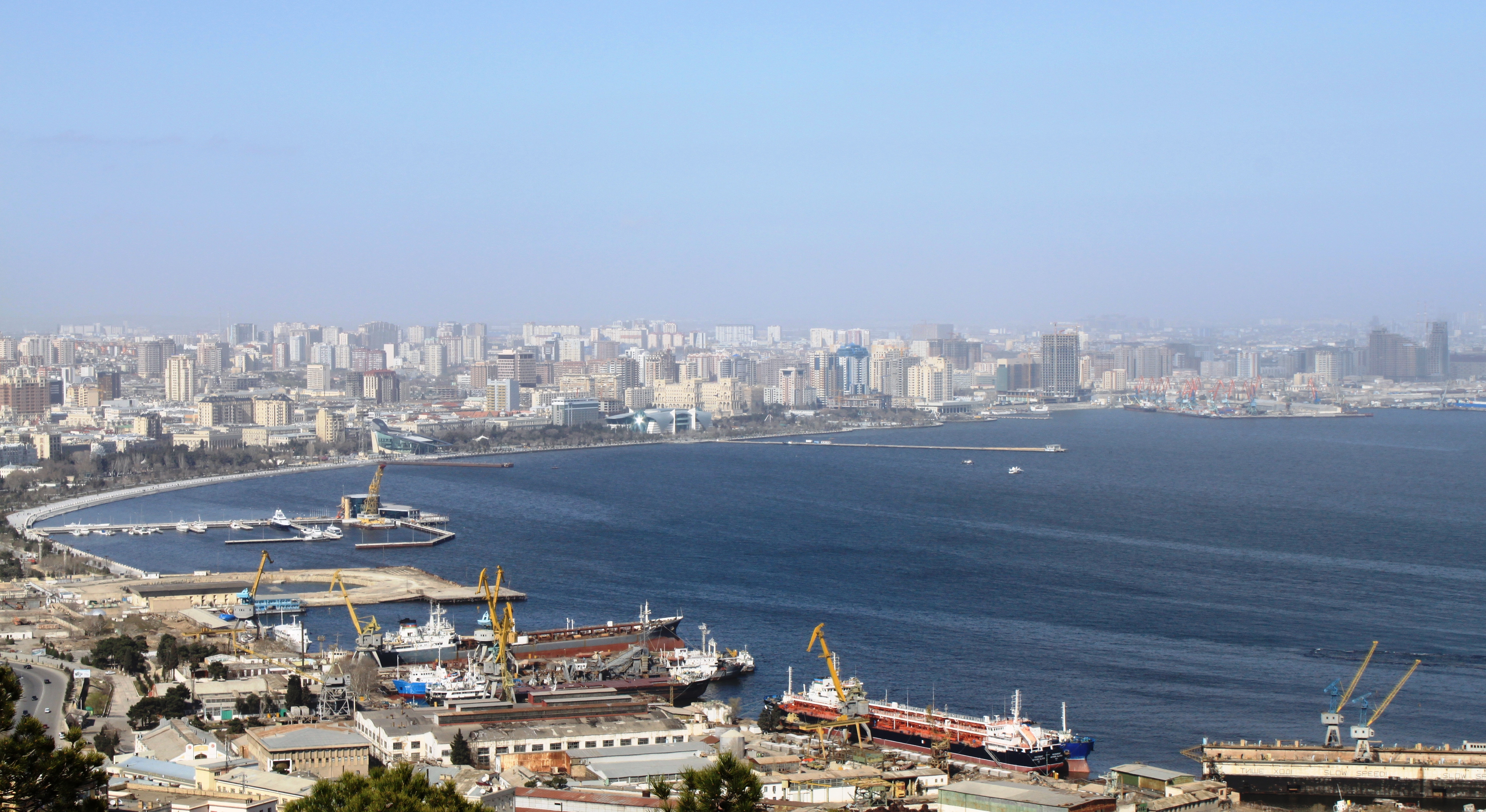
A view to the bay from Bayil hill

== Ecologic condition ==
According to a statement of a representative of the Ministry of Ecology and Natural Resources there are a lot of reasons of pollution of Baku bay. Wastes from industrial, dwelling and domestic objects located on the seashore and also exploitation of vessels, oil and gas deposits are the main factors that worsen the ecological condition. Works on investigation of depth of Baku bay began after 1996, and later works on extraction of metallic constructions and sunk vessels from water were begun. In 2007-2009's, large scale works on cleansing of the bay of sunken vessels, metallic constructions and non-exploited hydrotechnical constructions, non-serviceable subsea pipelines began. In all 4500 tons of scrap metal and approximately 412 tons of wooden waste were extracted from the sea.

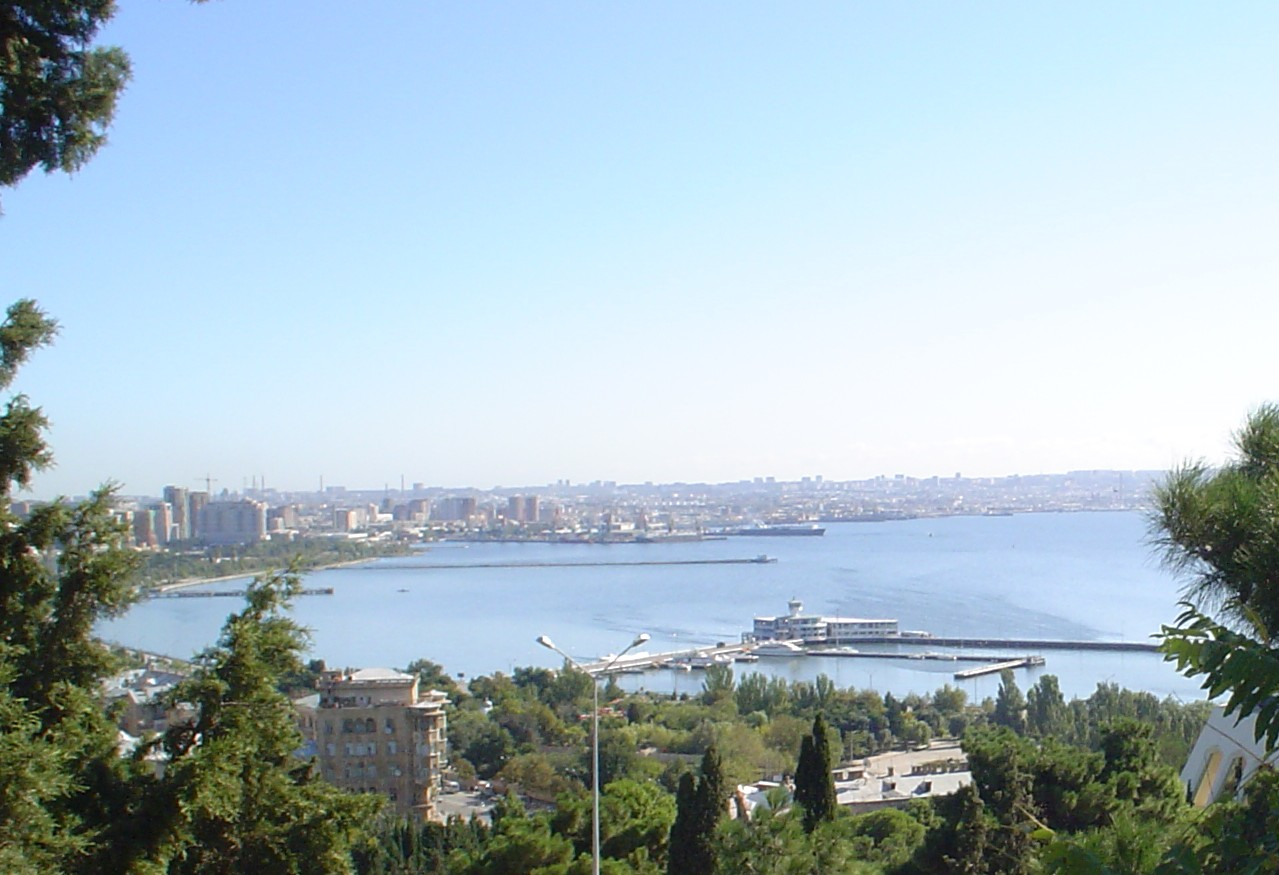
Part of the bay. A view from funicular.

== Ports and bridges ==
Trade port is stretched along the northern and western shores of Baku bay. The port is fully re-equipped, all loading and unloading works in it are mechanized. There is a port for ferry quay in the north-western part of Baku bay. There is discussion on the need of construction of a bridge through Baku bay, from Lokbatan to Zikh highway. It is considered that length of the bridge over the sea, from Shikh to Zig is 14.5 km. The total length of the bridge, which will be connected with encircling highway is 26 km. The sea bridge will be constructed on high piers, for not impeding movement of vessels. Automobile highway through Baku bay will be paid. Construction works will last for 3.5 years.

== Entertainments ==
Foreign companies plan to open a recreational center in Boyuk Zira and Pirallahi islands of Baku bay. In Azerbaijani newspapers is reported that a Turkish company which is preparing an appropriate project will hold the construction of the recreational center in Nargin Island. It is planned to open modern hotels, entertainment places and other buildings on the island. It is also planned to open one of the biggest lunaparks in the CIS, which will be constructed by German specialists. It is expected that the island will be one of the centers of tourism in the future.

== Interesting facts ==
- There is a flooded city around Sabayil Castle under the waters of Baku bay.
- A salad was named after Baku bay.

== Gallery ==
The Ashurbeyovs

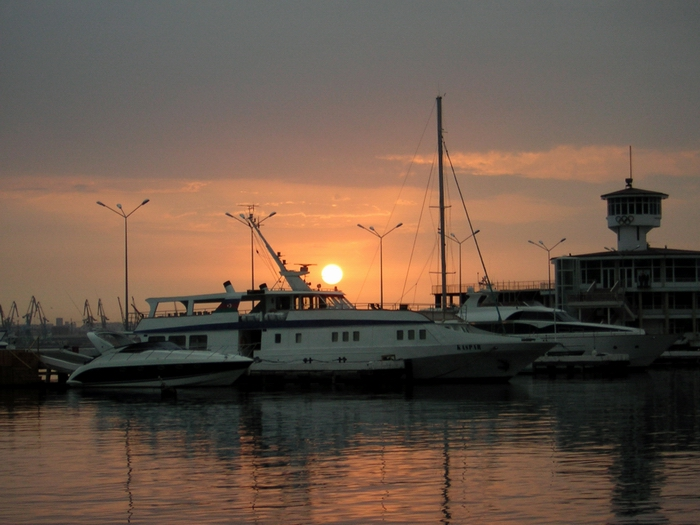
Yacht Club.

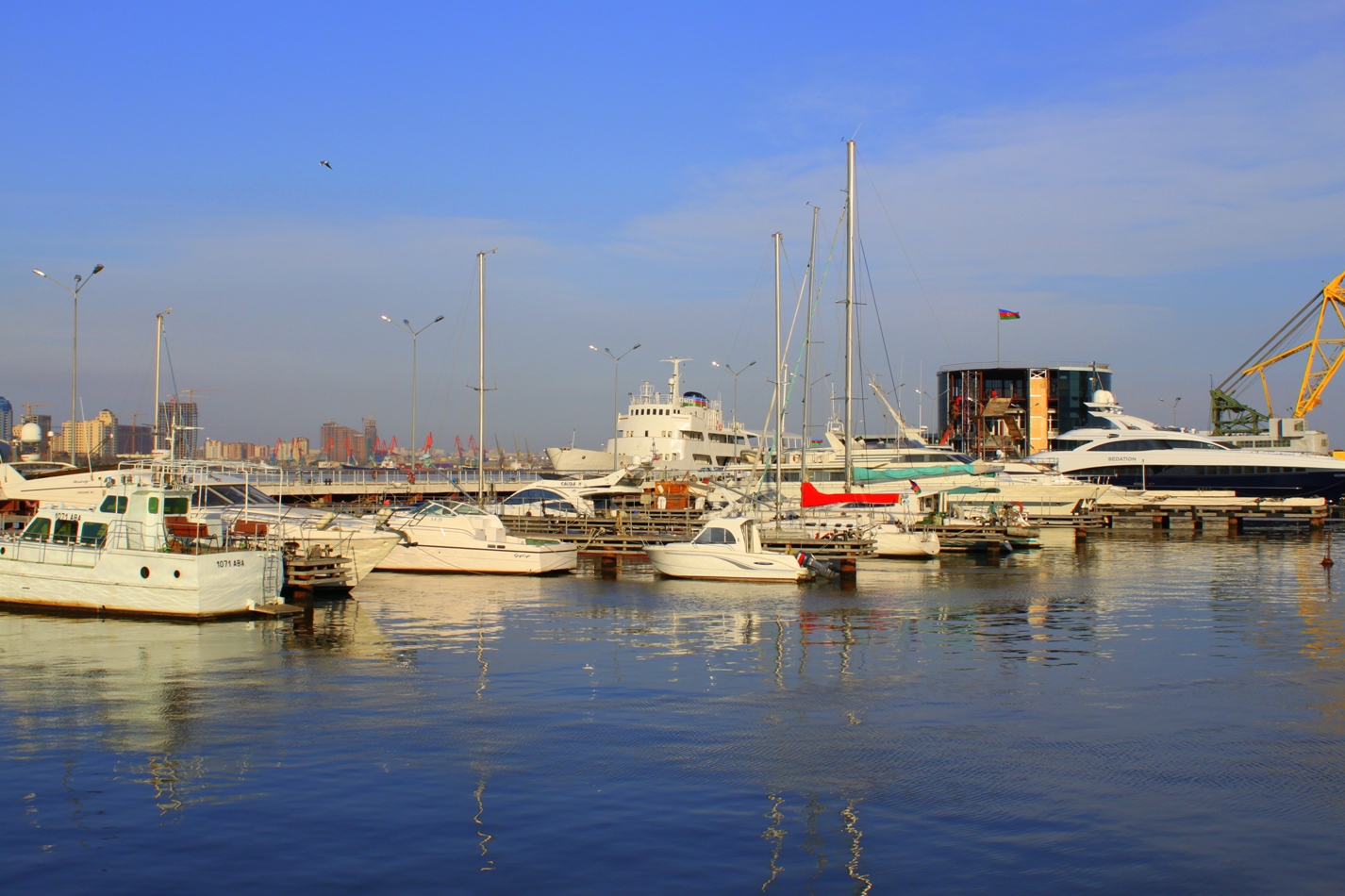
Yacht Club.

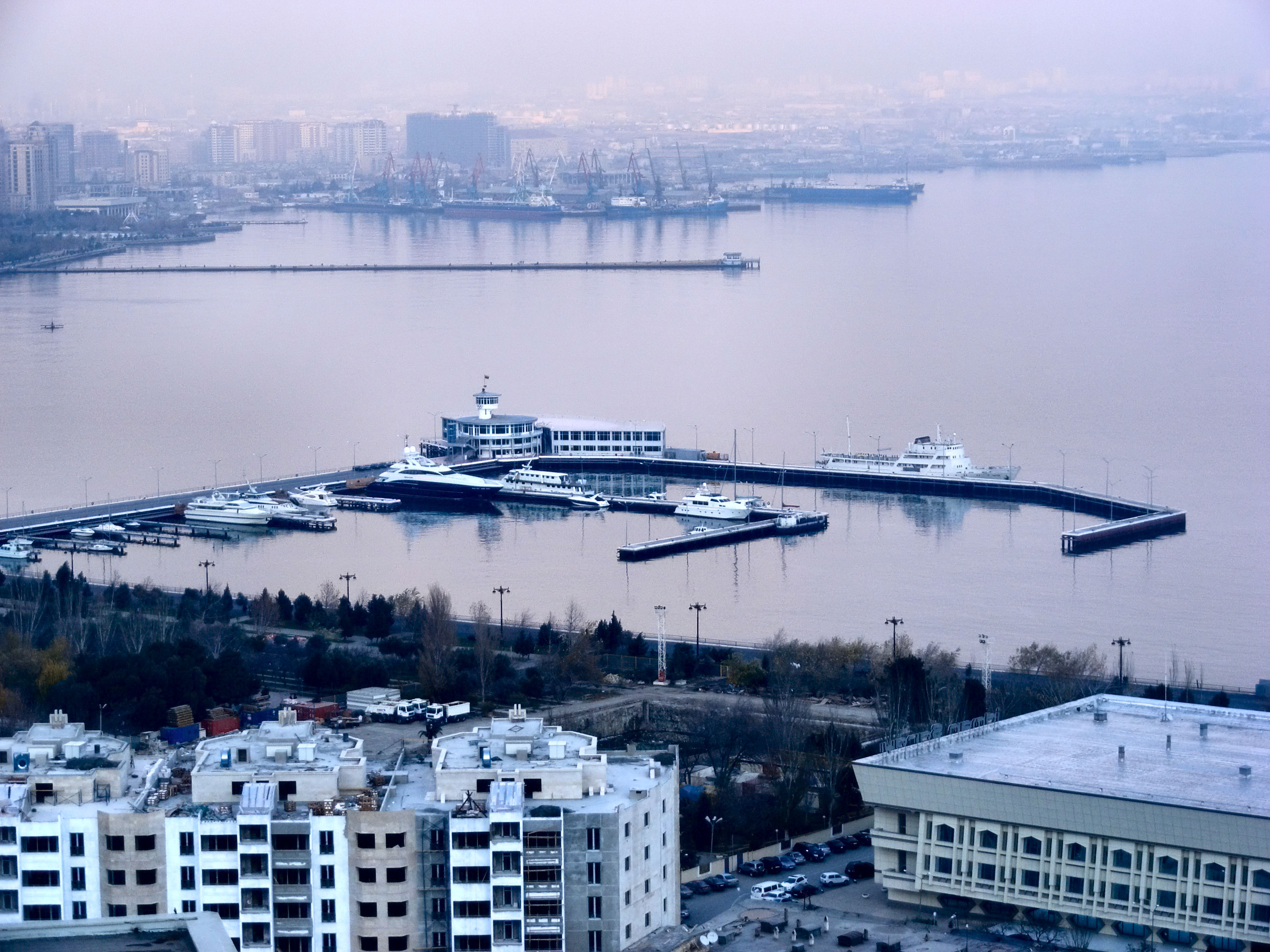
Yacht Club.

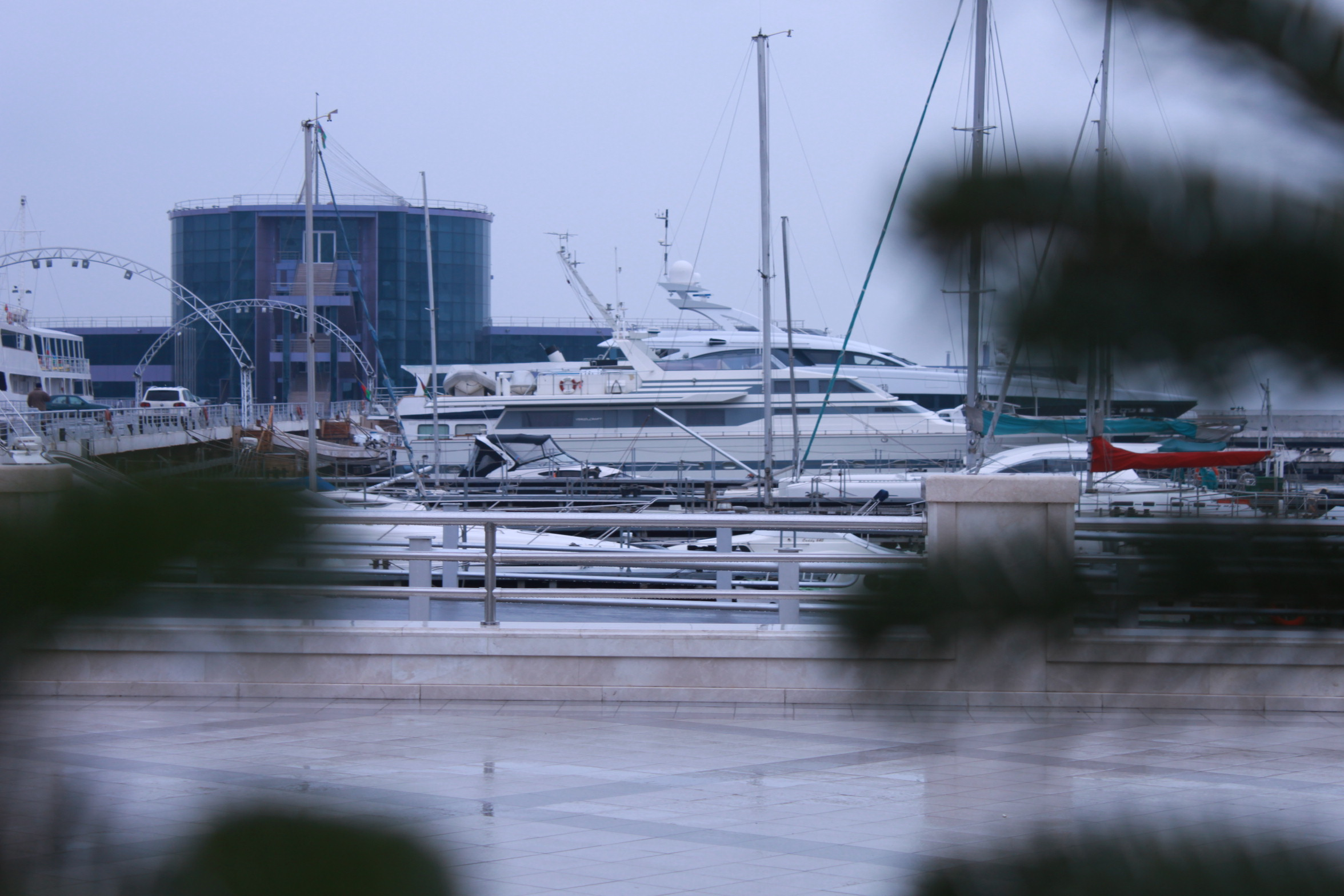
Yacht Club.

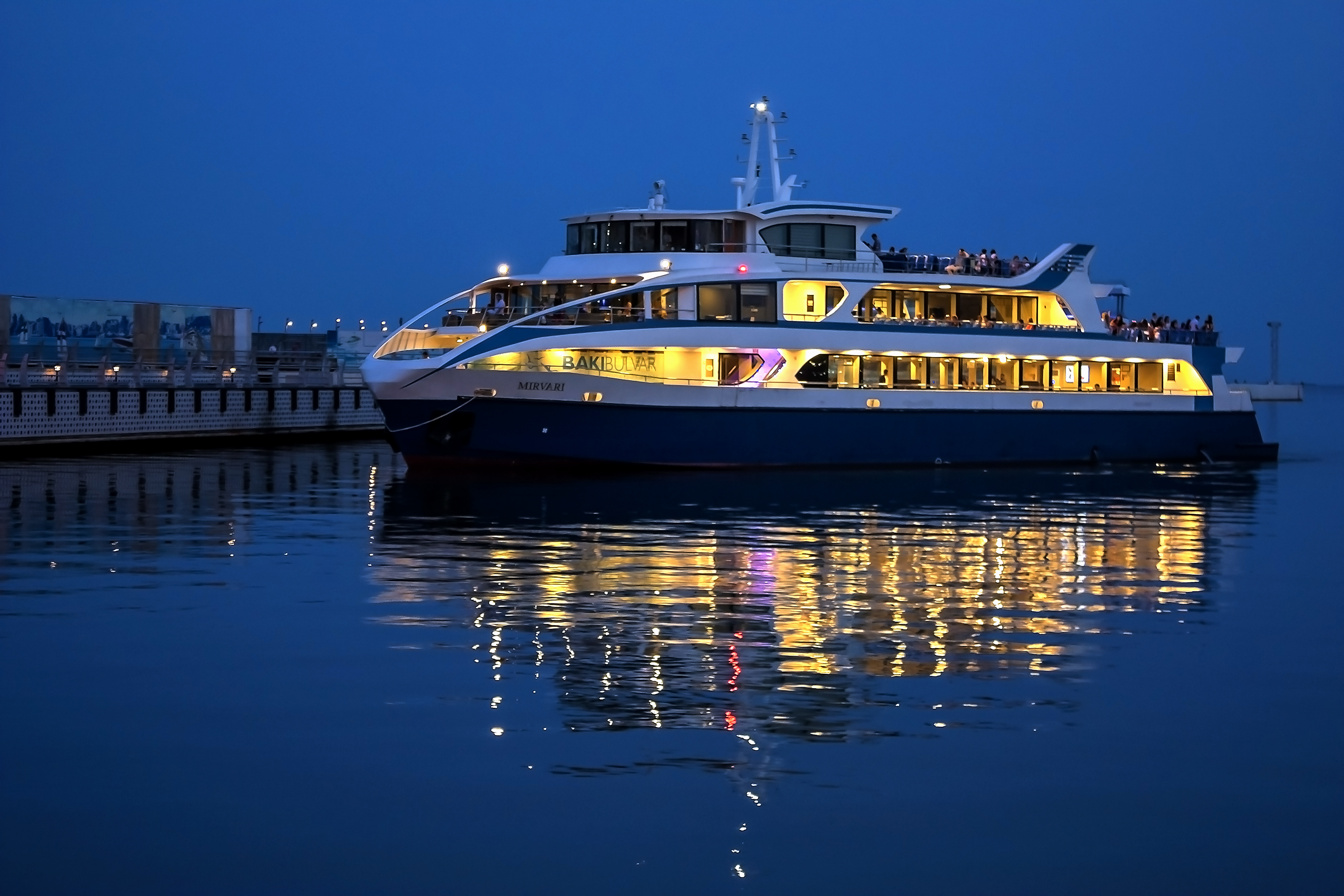
Boat Tour in the Baku

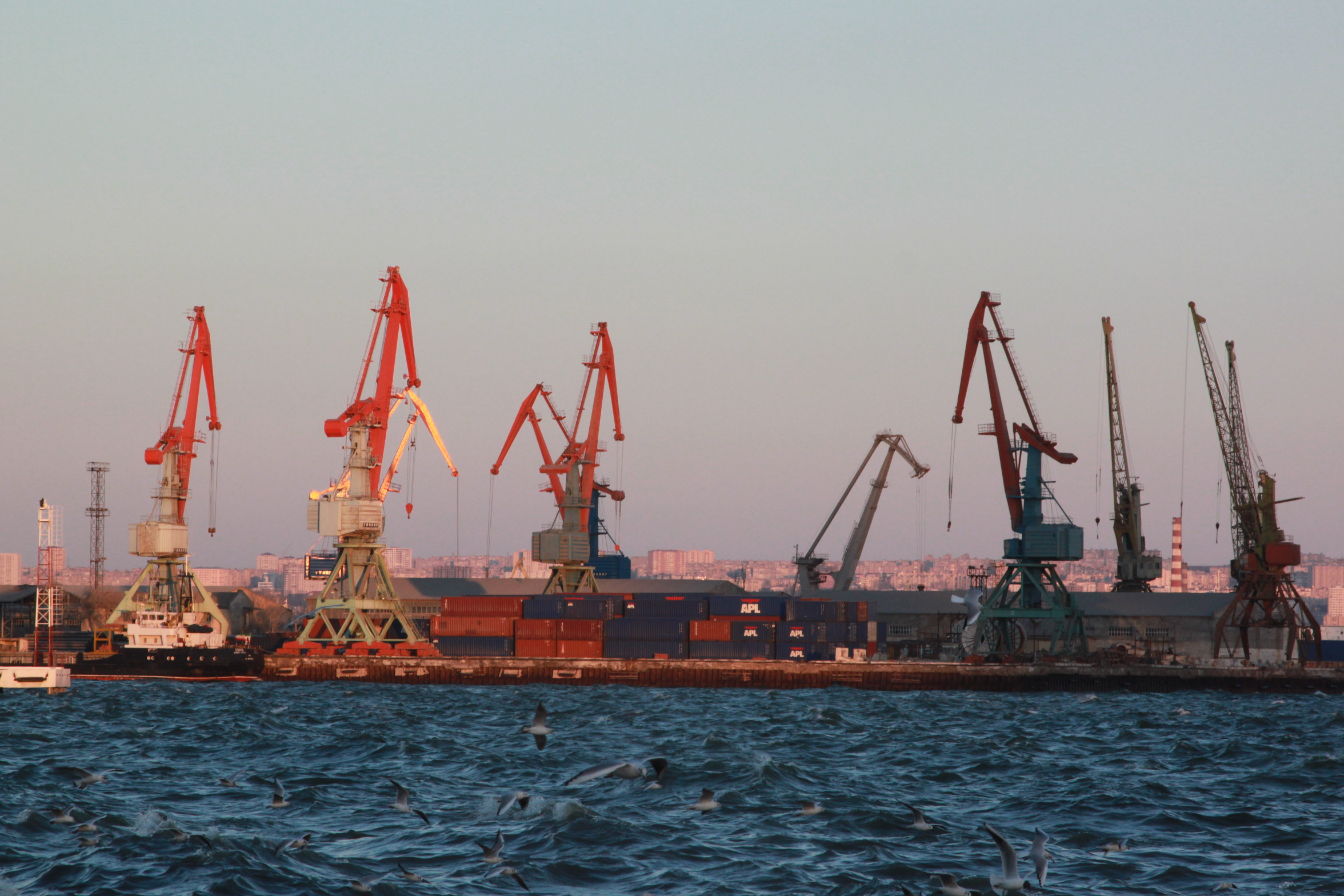
Baku Port.

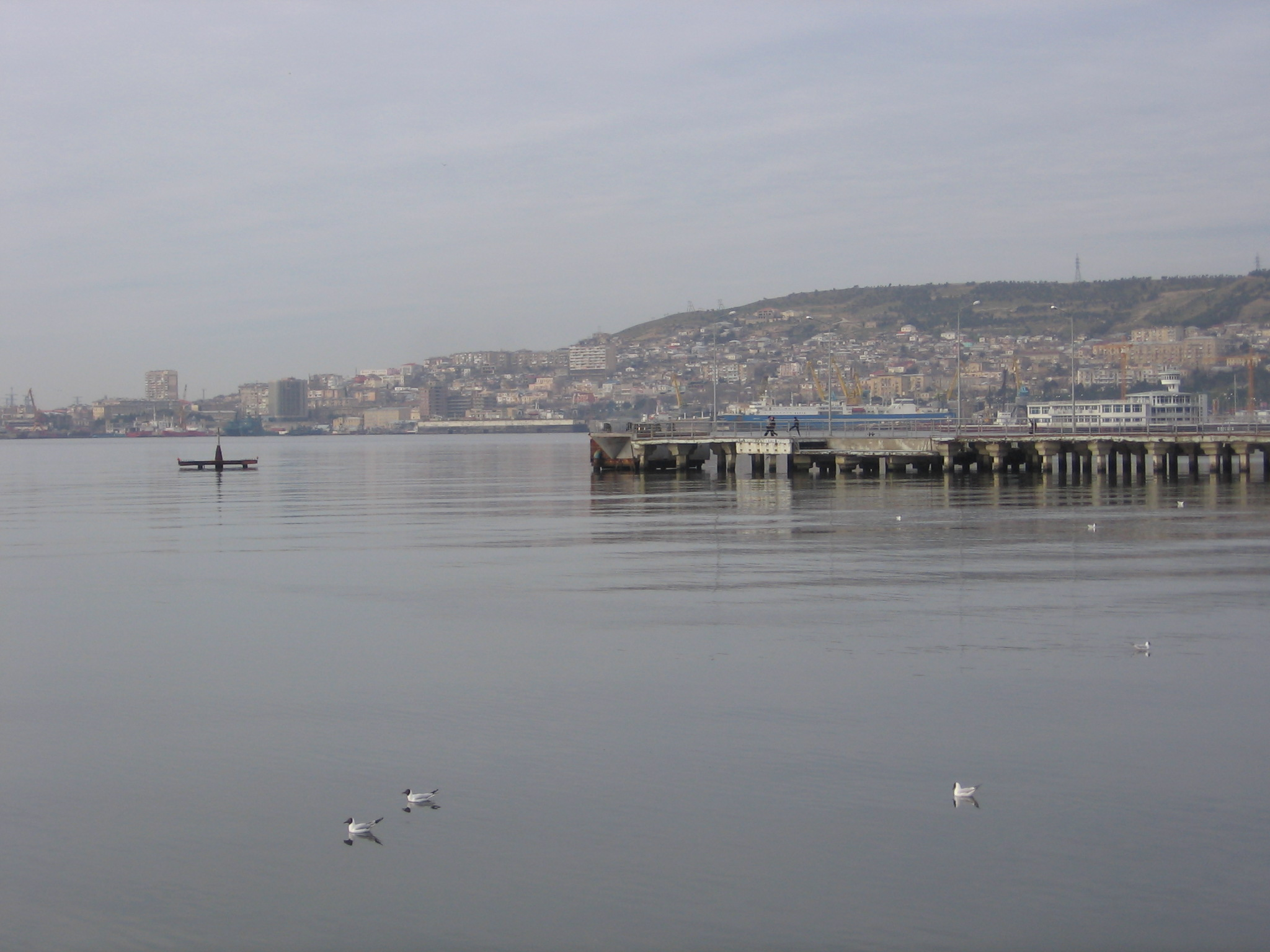
Baku bay in outskirts of Baku.

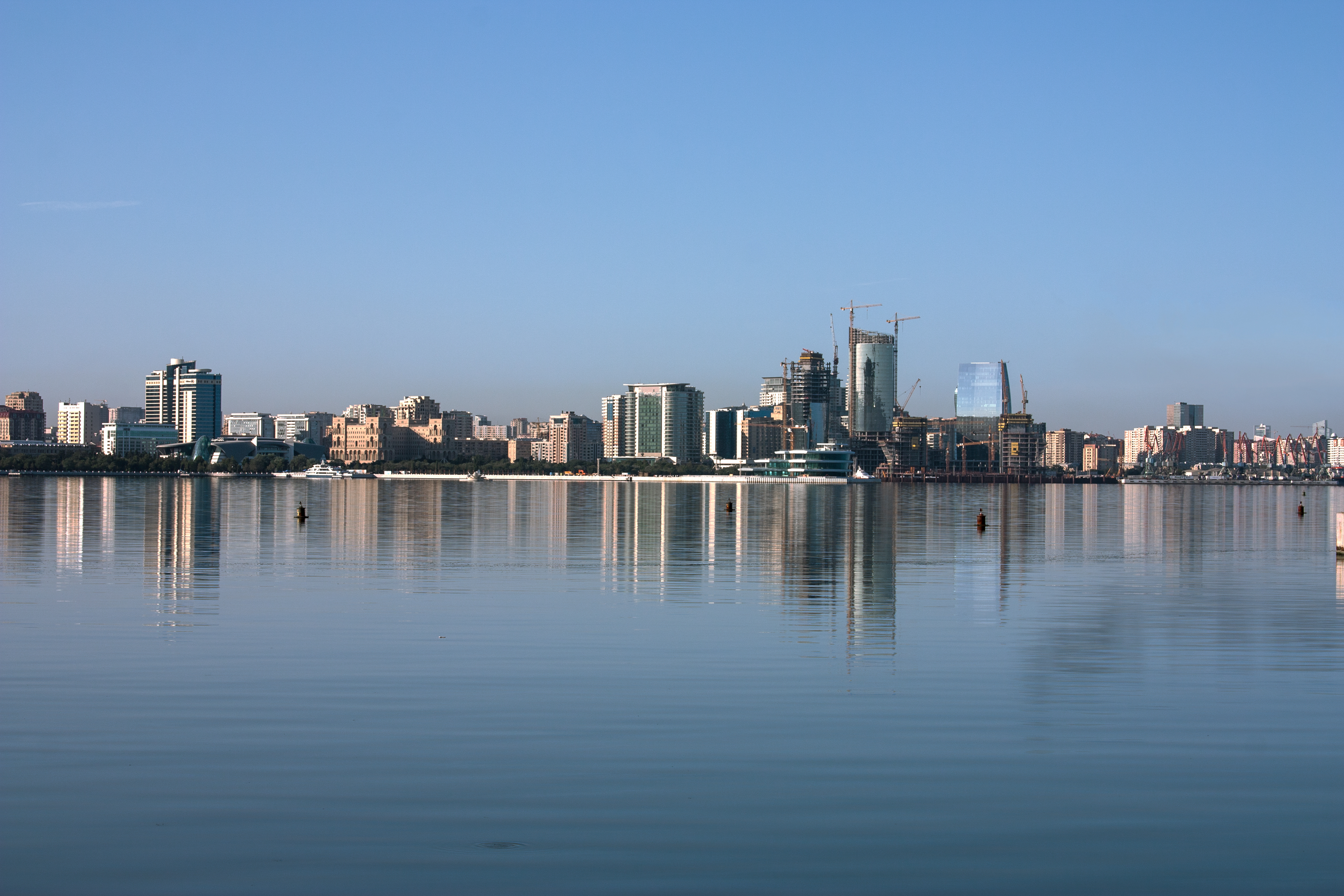
A view of the Baku bay, Azerbaijan
