= Bulla Island =

Bulla Island Xara Zira / Xərə Zirə
- Island of the Baku Archipelago
- Location within Caspian Sea
- Coordinates: 39°59′39″N 49°38′35″E
- Country: Azerbaijan
- Region: Absheron Region

Area
  - Total: 3.5 km^{2} (1.4 sq mi)

Bulla Island, also Xara Zira, Khara Zira or Khere Zire, (Azerbaijani: Xǝrǝ Zirǝ Adası) is an island south of the Bay of Baku, Caspian Sea. It is the largest island of the Baku Archipelago, located off Baku, Azerbaijan.

== Geography ==
Bulla Island's area is 3.5 km^{2} (1.4 sq mi); its length is about 2.4 km (1.5 mi) in length and 1.6 km (1.0 mi) wide. This island has a spit extending southwestward. The island has akdalaite and aluminium deposits and a mud volcano.

Bulla Island lies south of the bay, detached from the group, to the ENE of the town of Alat, about 13 km (8 mi) from the nearest shore.

== Fossil fuels ==
The island is a center for the nearby offshore gas development of the Bulla Deniz gas field, in production since 1968. It was the largest gas find in Azerbaijan before Shah-deniz and contains more than 4 trillion cubic feet (110 billion cubic metres) of gas reserves.

== See also ==
- List of islands of Azerbaijan
- Petroleum industry in Azerbaijan
