= Herring gull =

Herring gull is a common name for several birds in the genus Larus, all formerly treated as a single species.

Three species are still combined in some taxonomies:

- American herring gull (Larus smithsonianus) – North America
- European herring gull (Larus argentatus) – Northern Europe
- Vega gull (Larus vegae) – East Asia

Additional species formerly included within this species include:

- Armenian gull (Larus armenicus) – Caucasus and Middle East
- Caspian gull (Larus cachinnans) – Eastern Europe and Central Asia
- Yellow-legged gull (Larus michahellis) – Southern Europe, North Africa and Middle East
