= Qum Island =

Coordinates: 40°18′39″N 50°00′02″E

Qum Island Peschanniy
- Island of the Baku Archipelago
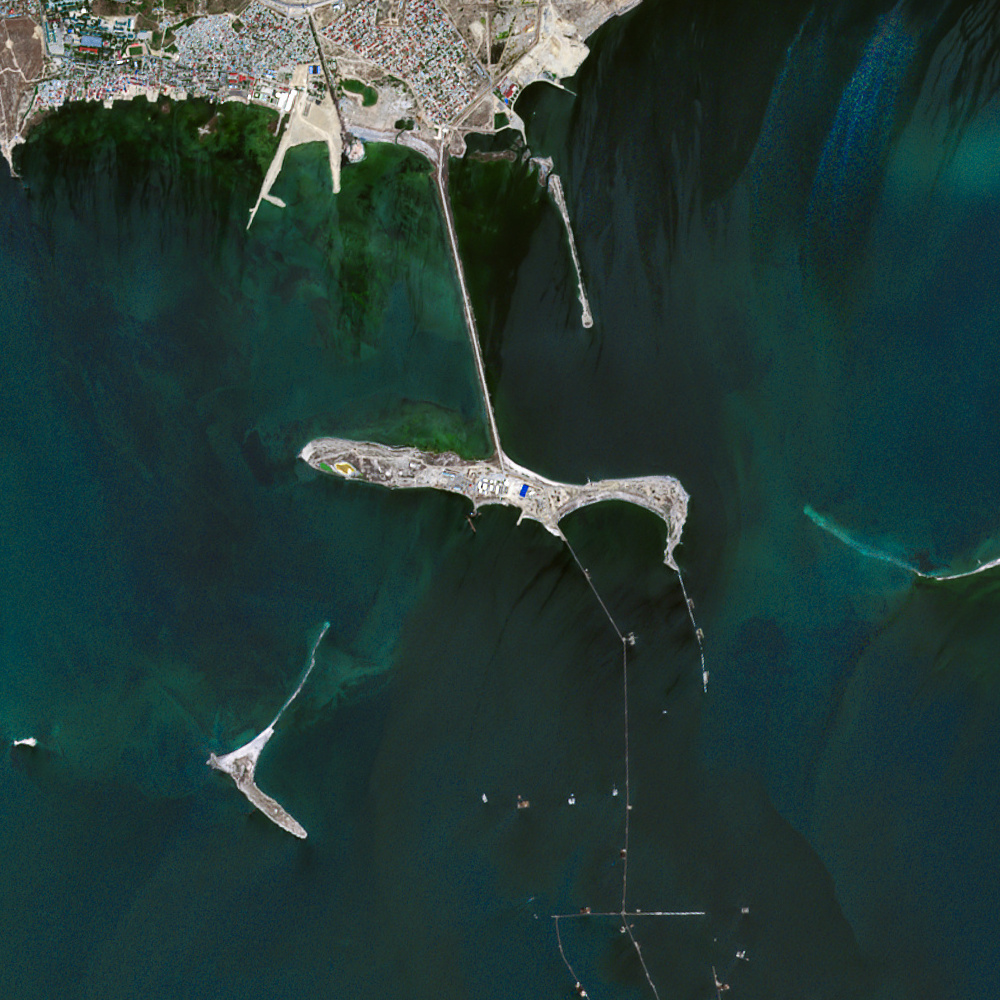
- Satellite photo of the island

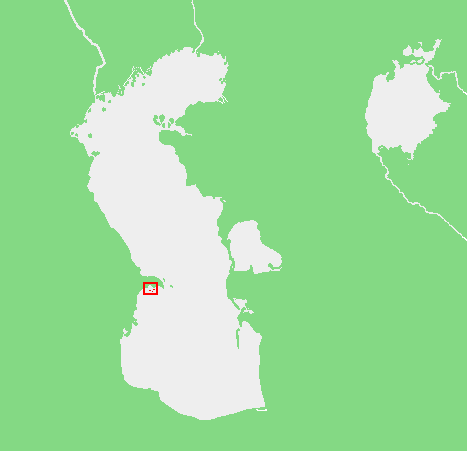
- Map showing the location of the Baku Archipelago.
- Country: Azerbaijan
- Region: Absheron Region

Area
  - Total: 1.5 km^{2} (0.58 sq mi)

Qum Island or Peschanniy (Russian: о́стров Песча́ный; 'Sandy Island'), Azeri: Qum adası) is an island in the Bay of Baku, in the Caspian Sea.

== Geography ==
Qum Island is 3.21 km (1.99 mi) in length with a maximum width of 0.27 km (0.17 mi). It is a part of the Surakhany raion, located south of Baku, Azerbaijan.

== See also ==
- List of islands of Azerbaijan
- Petroleum industry in Azerbaijan
