= Absheron Economic Region =

Absheron Economic Region Abşeron iqtisadi rayonu
- Economic region
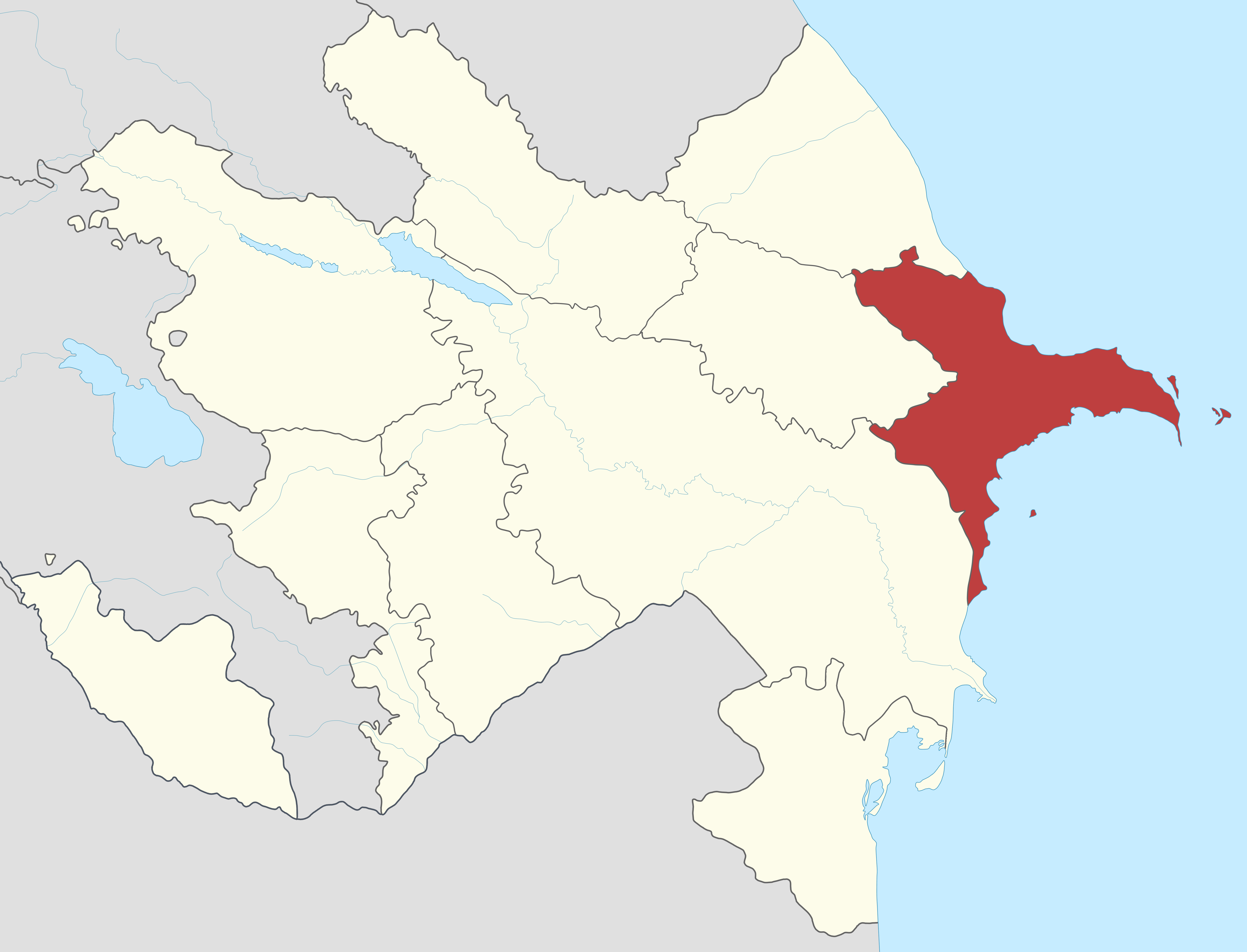
- Absheron Economic Region on the map of Azerbaijan
- Country: Azerbaijan

Area
  - Total: 3,290 km^{2} (1,270 sq mi)

Population
  - Total: 2,939,000
  - Density: 489.2/km^{2} (1,267/sq mi)
- HDI (2022): 0.805 very high · 2nd

The Absheron Economic Region is located in the eastern part of the Republic of Azerbaijan and comprises Baku and Sumgait cities and the Absheron and Khizi districts. The eastern part of the economic region is located on the shores of the Caspian Sea, which has positive effects on the economy of the region. It borders Shaki-Zaqatala economic region to the north, Mountainous Shirvan to the west and Aran to the south.

Absheron Economic Region covers an area of 3,290 square kilometers, constituting approximately 3.9% of the territory of Azerbaijan (excluding the city of Baku), and there are approximately 568,000 people as of the beginning of January 2018 (also excluding Baku). The population density was 103 people per square km of land area.

== Industry ==
Due to the oil and gas reserves of the region, Absheron Economic Region is mainly specialized in fossil fuel production and relevant areas such as petrochemistry and chemistry. As a significant part of the oil and gas industry is concentrated in the region, heavy industry, energetic, engineering industry, electrical engineering, and ferrous and non-ferrous metallurgy have become important branches of industry. Polymers, glass and construction materials are produced by construction enterprises within the economic region. The following table shows information about the share of industry in the economy of Absheron Economic region. According to the source, the share of the private sector in industrial production has increased significantly since 2013.

Statistic indicators for the industry by year.
	2010	2012	2013	2014	2015	2016
Number of operating enterprises total, unit	256	213	218	235	253	236
Industrial product (actual price of the relevant year), thousand manat	298,6	512,8	501,0	543,8	604,8	977,3
Industrial product, relative to previous year, in percent (at comparable prices)	127,5	112,7	99,1	108,2	104,5	115,9
Share of the non-public sector in industrial product, in percent	36,9	52,4	44,2	40,4	48,6	61,4
Remaining balance of finished goods for the year, thousand manat	12944	55765	30226	27202	31554	33913
Average number of employees - total, people	18378	17241	20899	21985	21834	19754
Average monthly salary of employees, manat	293,0	370,9	448,8	489,5	494,3	493,9
Availability of the main industrial and production assets (at the end of the year with the balance sheet), million. manat	1448	1622	1720	1794	1975	1979

== Agriculture ==
The agriculture of Absheron Economic region consists of livestock (including dairy and beef animal breeding), sheep, poultry farming, horticulture, vegetables, viniculture (vine-growing) and dry subtropical fruits. Semi-desert and dry steppe climate conditions make it possible to grow olive, pistachio, almond and saffron. “Ag shany” and “Qara shany” is considered as indigenous to this region and covers the most part of the gardens. The table below shows the exact amount of agricultural production based on the statistics from 2010 to 2016.

Statistic data based on agricultural production.
	2010	2012	2013	2014	2015	2016
Total area of sown agricultural crops (ha)						
Cereals and cereal legumes	1944	2425	2498	1842	1774	2691
Including wheat	621	805	744	559	664	756
Sunflower for seed production	-	-	-	-	-	10
Potato	46	32	45	48	50	63
Vegetables	474	468	482	493	564	792
Horticulture	170	216	191	198	224	232
Fruit and berry	2717	2753	2786	2782	2782	3191
Grape	188	203	188	191	191	168
Productivity (in all categories of farming), ton						
Cereals and cereal legumes	2809	3658	3750	2532	2650	4478
Including wheat	938	1287	1198	863	1044	1369
Sunflower for seed production	-	-	-	-	-	15
Potato	320	217	320	335	352	461
Vegetables	7865	7459	8420	9316	9402	45061
Horticulture	1435	1692	1659	1720	2099	2361
Fruit and berry	1808	1512	1633	1398	1683	1899
Grape	209	223	230	257	506	516
Productivity (in all categories of farming), centner / ha						
Cereals and cereal legumes	14,4	15,1	15,0	13,7	14,9	16,7
Including wheat	15,1	16,0	16,1	15,4	15,7	18,1
Sunflower for seed production	-	-	-	-	-	18,0
Potato	70	68	72	70	71	73
Vegetables	98	95	88	89	92	91
Horticulture	84	78	87	87	94	102
Fruit and berry	7,0	6,1	6,3	5,1	6,1	6,7
Grape	17,9	7,3	7,5	8,7	20,8	22,8
Number of Livestock (in total)						
Cattle	31457	33578	32508	32594	35042	35035
Including cow and buffalo	17799	19206	18562	19185	19382	19623
Sheep and goats	196088	211663	205700	204108	194867	193114
Pigs	292	-	108	115	566	-
Birds	3010234	2007630	1879475	3297755	2613531	3513874
Bee families	849	980	850	1080	1051	1155
Production of animal products, ton						
Meat	2543	4258	6230	7076	5149	5192
Milk	42678	53580	53918	52802	56062	61280
Eggs	333805	210700	173797	244074	254151	342826
Wool	418	426	424	431	440	525

== Transportation ==
As the most important railways, highways and rivers pass through its territory, the infrastructure has developed more in the region compared to the rest of the country. Its access to the Caspian Sea enables maritime transportation. The table below indicates detailed data about transportation of both cargos and passengers.

Statistics of Transportation by year.
	2010	2012	2013	2014	2015	2016
Cargo transportation, thousand tons	3818	4431	4695	4822	5058	5240
Freight turnover, mlyn. tons	329,9	405,2	433,0	445,5	467,8	484,3
Passenger transportation, thousand people	94694	109777	117712	123777	131767	137273
Passenger turnover, mlyn. Passenger km	1462,4	1653,3	1759,7	1851,0	1973	2057,8
Total number of cars, units	33405	42911	51479	57548	60430	62421
including:						
Trucks	4552	5589	6044	6527	6647	6781
Buses	1970	1834	1901	1950	2038	2089
Number of vehicles for public transportation	26097	34945	42861	48264	50881	52631
Personal cars	25281	33958	41803	46997	49642	51427
Vehicles for special purposes	595	373	447	449	477	522
Other vehicles	191	170	226	358	387	398

== Demography ==
The table below provides information on demography of Absheron Economic region from 2010 to 2016. There were 563,100 people in the economic region according to the statistics of 2016 (without the city of Baku).

Demographic indicators of Absheron Economic Region.
	2010	2012	2013	2014	2015	2016
Population
Population (by the end of the year, thousand people	522,8	538,4	545,3	551,8	557,8	563,1
Natural increase	4654	7706	5630	5949	5903	5403
Births	7228	10341	8114	8610	8593	8222
Deaths	2574	2635	2484	2661	2690	2819
Including:						
Children under the age of 1	132	148	142	126	174	128
Weddings	3951	3888	4539	4595	3839	3699
Divorces	595	811	854	777	820	871
Per 1000 population
Natural increase	9,0	14,5	10,4	10,8	10,7	9,7
Births	13,9	19,4	15,0	15,7	15,5	14,7
Deaths	4,9	4,9	4,6	4,9	4,8	5,0
Including:						
Children under the age 1	16,9	16,2	15,7	16,0	17,4	18,0
Weddings	7,6	7,3	8,4	8,4	6,9	6,6
Divorces	1,1	1,5	1,6	1,4	1,5	1,6

== Geography ==
The territory of Absheron region covers the south-east parts of Lengebiz low-altitude mountain and The Greater Caucasus ranges, the east part of Gobustan and Absheron peninsula, south-east of Samur-Devechi lowland, and the northern part of the Southeastern Shirvan plain. The relief mainly consists of low-altitude mountains and plains. The surface is surrounded by crevices, crevices, gorges, hills, and slopes along the arches and tulips. Its lowest point is 28 m below sea level and the highest elevation is Dubrar Mountain (2205m above sea level).

== Hydrography ==
The river network of the region is sparse. The main rivers are Atacay, Sumgayit, Jeyrankechmez. The Samur-Absheron Channel and the Shirvan collector pass through its territory. There are numerous small lakes and the largest one is Masazir Lake. The salinity of the water of these lakes is very high.

== See also ==
- Administrative divisions of Azerbaijan
