= Gylman Ilkin =

Azerbaijani writer and pedagogue

Gylman Ilkin Qılman İlkin
- Born: April 28, 1914; Mardakan, Baku Gradonachalstvo, Russian Empire
- Died: November 6, 2009 (aged 95); Baku, Azerbaijan
- Resting place: II Alley of Honor
- Citizenship: Russian Empire; Azerbaijan Democratic Republic; USSR; Azerbaijan
- Education: Azerbaijan Pedagogical University
- Occupations: Writer; contributing editor; pedagogue
- Writing career
- Language: Azerbaijani
- Years active: 1943–2009

Gylman Isabala oghlu Musayev (Azerbaijani: Qılman İsabala oğlu Musayev) was an Azerbaijani writer, editor, and pedagogue. He was born on April 28, 1914, in Mardakan. He received his first education here. In 1926–1929 he studied at the city pedagogical technical school and in 1932–1936 at the language and literature faculty of the Azerbaijan Pedagogical University.

Gylman started his career as a school teacher in Akhmedoba village of Khachmaz District. From 1931 to 1932 he worked as a literary worker in the editorial office of the "Gənc işçi" (Young Worker) newspaper, where his works were published, and from 1938 he worked as a consultant, editor-in-chief and director of the "Uşaqgəncnəşr". The writer, who worked as a teacher at the Azerbaijan State University, took part in the Great Patriotic War and during the war worked as a correspondent for military newspapers on the Caucasus front and in Iran, and worked in the editorial office of the soldier newspaper "Vatan Yolunda" published in Tabriz.

After returning from the war, Gylman Ilkin served as the scientific secretary of the Nizami Ganjavi Jubilee Committee and senior lecturer at the Azerbaijan State University, and was accepted as a member of the Union of Azerbaijani Writers. In 1960–1963 he was the editor-in-chief of the Azernashr, in 1963–1967 he was the editor-in-chief of the "Azerbaijan" magazine, and in 1967–1971 he again worked as the director of the Azernashr. He retired in 1974.

Gylman Ilkin died of heart failure on November 6, 2009, in Baku and was buried in the II Alley of Honor.

== Career ==
G. Ilkin began his early literary career in 1943 with the story The Wounded Falcon. His story On the Ways of Life dedicated to the childhood of Najaf bey Vazirov was published in 1947. In addition, his works include Rebellion in the Castle (1959), Northern Wind (1962), Gift (1969), Mountain Quarter (1978), Sea Gate (1984), Madame Gadri (1988), and Baku and Bakuvians (1998). From 1994 to 2000, he wrote Do you know Baku? and Peacock's feather which were published in mass circulation. The film "Invincible Battalion" was shot in "Azerbaijanfilm" based on his novel Rebellion in the Castle. He also wrote the screenplay for "Shadows Crawl".

The writer was the author of the plays such as "Surgeons", "Taiga Tale", "Soldier Returns from the War", "There is no way back", "Difficult curves", "Grandpa and grandson", "Life Trials", "The Ant Kicked", "Northern Wind" (1962) and a series of short stories. Most of these works have been shown on television for a long time, and the play "New Student" has been staged.

The author, who has published more than 50 books during his career, includes four novels in these publications. Other books contain narratives and stories.

== Awards ==
- People's Writer of Azerbaijan — January 27, 2003
- Honored Art Worker of the Azerbaijan SSR — May 17, 1989
- Mirza Fatali Akhundov State Prize of the Azerbaijan SSR — April 28, 1967
- Order of the Red Banner of Labour — October 28, 1967
- II degree Order of the Patriotic War — April 6, 1985
- Medal "For Distinguished Labour" — June 9, 1959
- Medal "For the Victory over Germany in the Great Patriotic War 1941–1945" — May 9, 1945
- Individual pension of the President of the Republic of Azerbaijan – Since June 11, 2002
- Honorary Decree of the Presidium of the Supreme Soviet of the Azerbaijan SSR (2 times)
- Humay Award
- "Purity" award of the Supreme Religious Council of the Caucasian Peoples

== Memorial ==
On July 8, 2014, President of Azerbaijan Ilham Aliyev signed a decree on the 100th anniversary of People's Writer Gylman Ilkin. There is a street named after him in Mardakan settlement, Khazar raion.
