= Mardakan Castle =

Mardakan Castle may refer to:

- Quadrangular castle (Mardakan)
- Round Castle (Mardakan)
