= Dalga Beach =

Water park in Mardakan, Baku, Azerbaijan

- Interactive map of Dalga Beach
- Location: Mardakan, Khazar, Azerbaijan
- Coordinates: 40°30′46″N 50°10′6″E
- Operated by: PMD Group
- Opened: May 26, 2015; 10 years ago
- Operating season: Summer
- Area: 68,000 square metres (17 acres)
- Pools: 10 pools
- Water slides: 7 water slides
- Children's areas: 2 children's areas
- Website: dalgha.az/en

Dalga Beach (Azerbaijani: Dalğa Beach), officially the Dalga Beach Aquapark Resort, is a water park and a resort in Mardakan municipality of Khazar Rayon located in the capital city of Baku, Azerbaijan. It is positioned on the shore of the Caspian Sea in the Absheron Peninsula. It is the largest water park in Azerbaijan and the Caucasus, with a total area of 68 thousand square meters.

== History ==
Dalga Beach was opened and inaugurated by the President of the Republic of Azerbaijan, Ilham Aliyev, and Vice President of the Republic of Azerbaijan, Mehriban Aliyeva, on May 26, 2015. Grand opening of the water park was held later the same year in June. It was inaugurated ahead of the 2015 European Games that were held in Baku. Its construction was a part of the development of the country's economic and social sector. From January to September 2015, 74.0 percent of the 11 billion 831 million manat, allocated to fixed capital from all financial sources for the development and construction was utilized. Construction of the area began in 2012, and lasted 3 years. The resort became the first water park in the eastern part of the Absheron Peninsula, and at the time of its completion became the biggest water park in the region of Caucasus.

=== Developments ===
An international open footvolley tournament was held at the Dalga Beach sports ground on July 14–15, 2018, organized by the Azerbaijan Futnet Federation (AFNA). The tournament lasted for two days and featured national teams from 8 countries: Azerbaijan, Brazil, the Netherlands, Portugal, Iran, Russia, Pakistan, and Austria. It was the first time the Brazilian national footvolley team visited Azerbaijan. An opening ceremony took place before the competition. Football players such as Anderson Aquino, Erik Drent, Kasper Schlebunich, and Onni Cohen participated in the tournament. A year later, the Baku World Open International Footvolley Tournament was held from August 2 to 4 at Dalga Lite. The tournament featured over 30 teams from 14 countries.

In 2023, a procedure for an administrative offense protocol has been instituted against Dalga Beach LLC for violating tax, fee, financial, and insurance law by evading mandatory audits. According to media reports, the process began pursuant to Article 464 of the Code of Administrative Offenses. The article stipulates that employees who skip a compulsory audit established by the Law of the Republic of Azerbaijan "On Auditor Service" should be penalized with 300-600 manats, while legal entities should be fined 1,500-2,500 manats. The case was passed to Anar Ibadzadeh at the Nasimi District Court of Baku City.

Dalga Beach has been frequently used as a site for events by the Heydar Aliyev Foundation throughout its history. On August 26, 2024, Mehriban Aliyeva and Leyla Aliyeva, vice-president of the Heydar Aliyev Foundation, attended an event organized for children in need, including those deprived of parental care, children with special needs, and children of martyrs which took place on the grounds of the territory of Dalga Beach.

== Attractions ==
The water park contains a number of pools with water slides. It includes various entertainment activities at the resort such as VNR games, theme parties, dance performances, and water sports such as jet skiing and water skiing, where professional trainers supervise the activities. Dalga Beach also features residential villas. The on-site restaurants serve a variety of local and international dishes. Additionally, the resort includes "Dalga Lite," a beach facility that provides access to the Caspian Sea with a total area of 26 thousand square meters. It comes with sunbeds, tables, sun umbrellas, Wi-Fi, and changing and showering facilities. Additionally, Dalga Lite Cafe serves a wide range of food and drinks and is also used for events such as birthdays, hen parties, baby showers, weddings, or team-building activities.

=== Facilities and Services ===
The Dalga Beach Residential Villas are private accommodations within Dalga Beach Aquapark Resort, featuring four bedrooms and three bathrooms. Each villa includes two Jacuzzis, a large dining room, a living room, and two kitchens. A 250-square-meter terrace provides outdoor space with a sea view. The villas offer recreational facilities such as a billiard room and a private pool. Wellness amenities include a steam room, sauna, and massage room. Additional features include six LCD satellite TVs, internet access, and telephone services.

Dalga Beach Aquapark Resort includes the following restaurants: Yelkan Restaurant, which mainly serves Azerbaijani food, located in the most accessible part of the water park, Dalga Burger, adjacent to the Kids Pool and Kids Club, Kabab House, serving local cuisine, Del Faro Italian Restaurant, and Xazri Restaurant, a place made for events.

=== Entertainment ===
Virtual reality gaming at Dalga Beach is provided by PhobiaVR, a VR company in Azerbaijan. The experience includes VR technology for interactive simulations. Aqua sports at Dalga Beach include jet skiing, flyboarding, kayaking, water skiing, and wakeboarding. The Animation Team at Dalga Beach organizes activities such as contests, show programs, foam parties, dance programs, water aerobics, and children's entertainment. A DJ provides music, and concerts are occasionally held with various artists as part of the "Dalga Fest" festival. Dalga Beach Kids Club offers activities for children, including arts and crafts and a play area. It has an independent swimming pool with slides and a depth of 60 cm. Dalga Beach Aquapark & Resort has ten pools, including main pools along a 700-square meter pool, a kids' pool, a wave pool, a surfing pool, a ladies-only pool, Jacuzzi pools, and a villa pool. Various pool slides are also available.

== See also ==
- List of water parks in Asia
- List of water parks in Europe
