= Mardakan =

Mardakan Mərdəkan
- Municipality
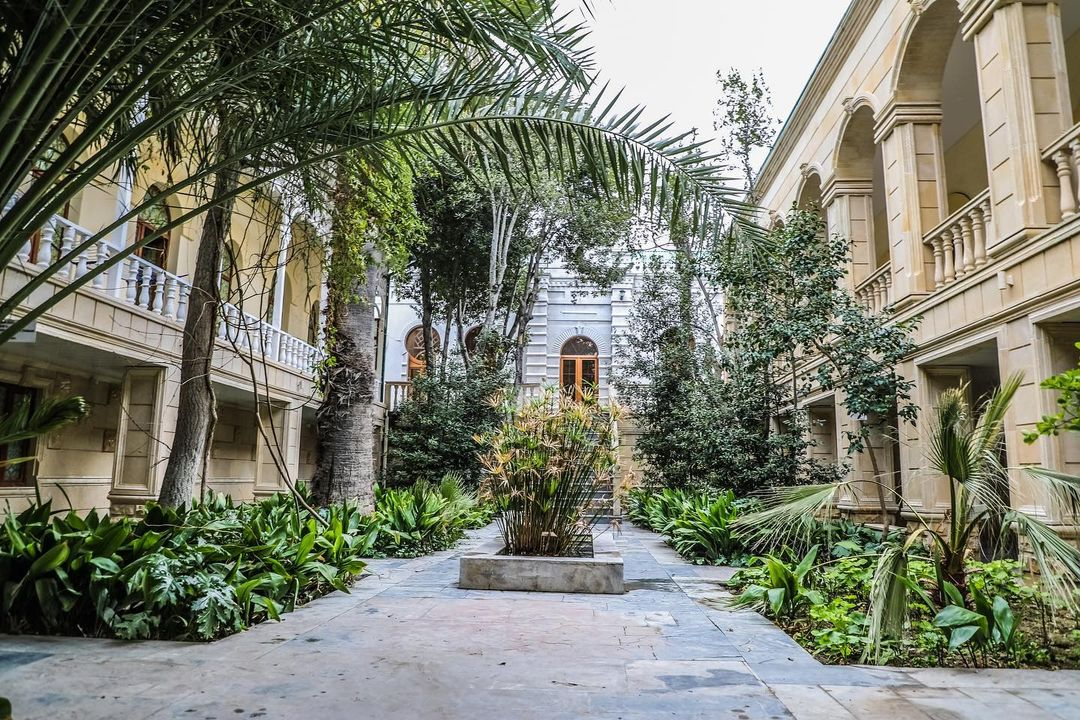
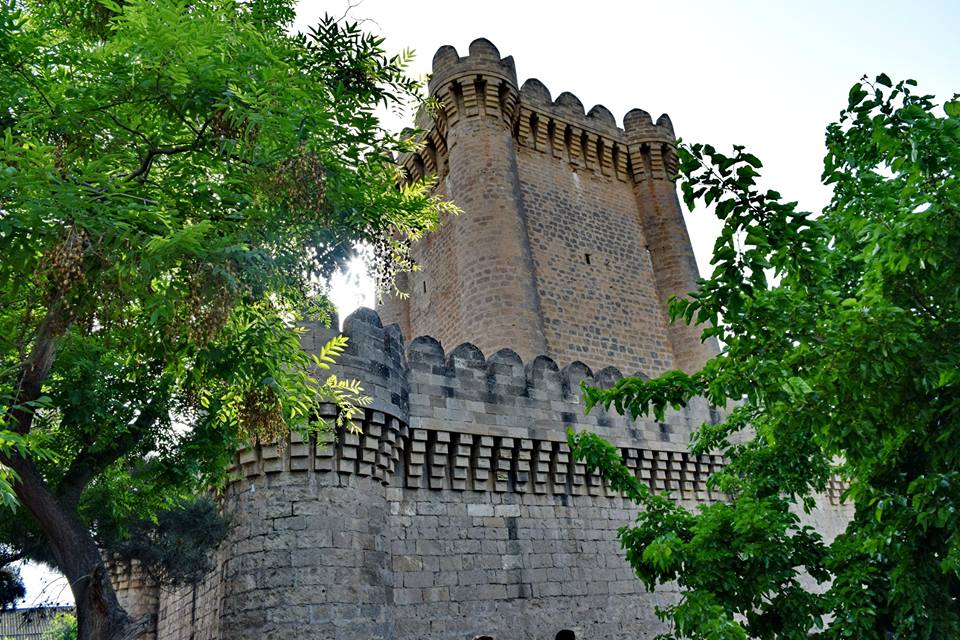
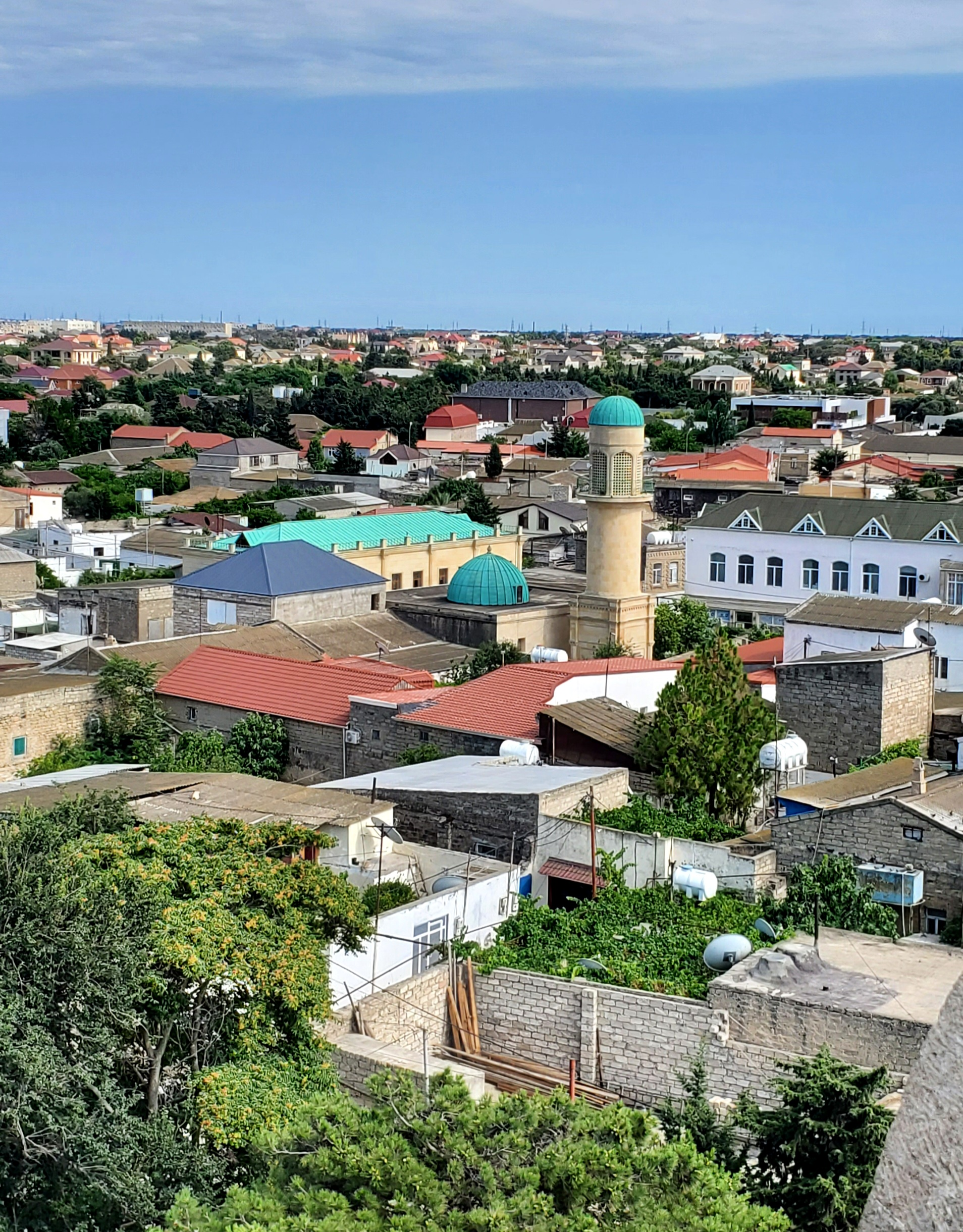
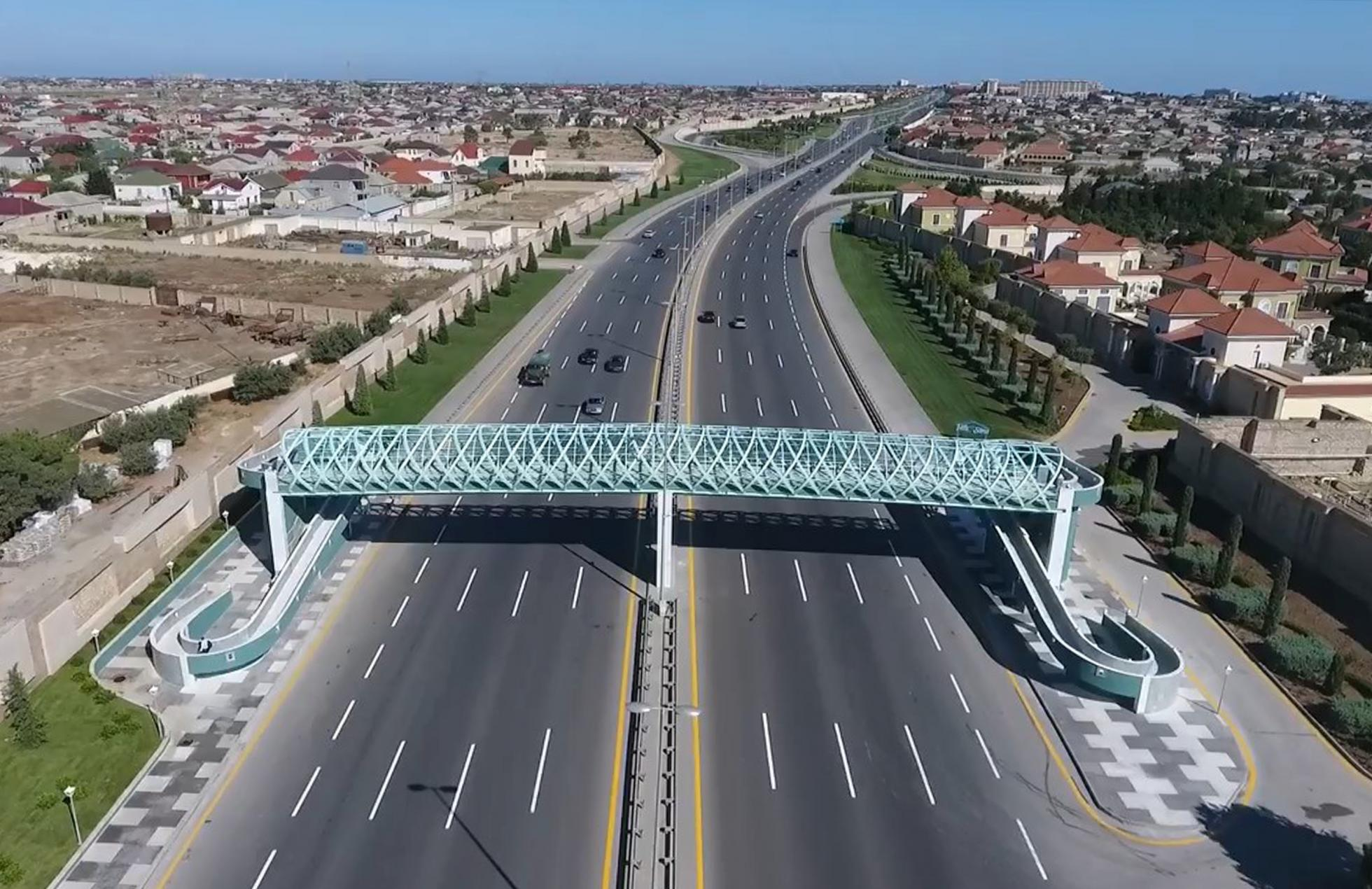
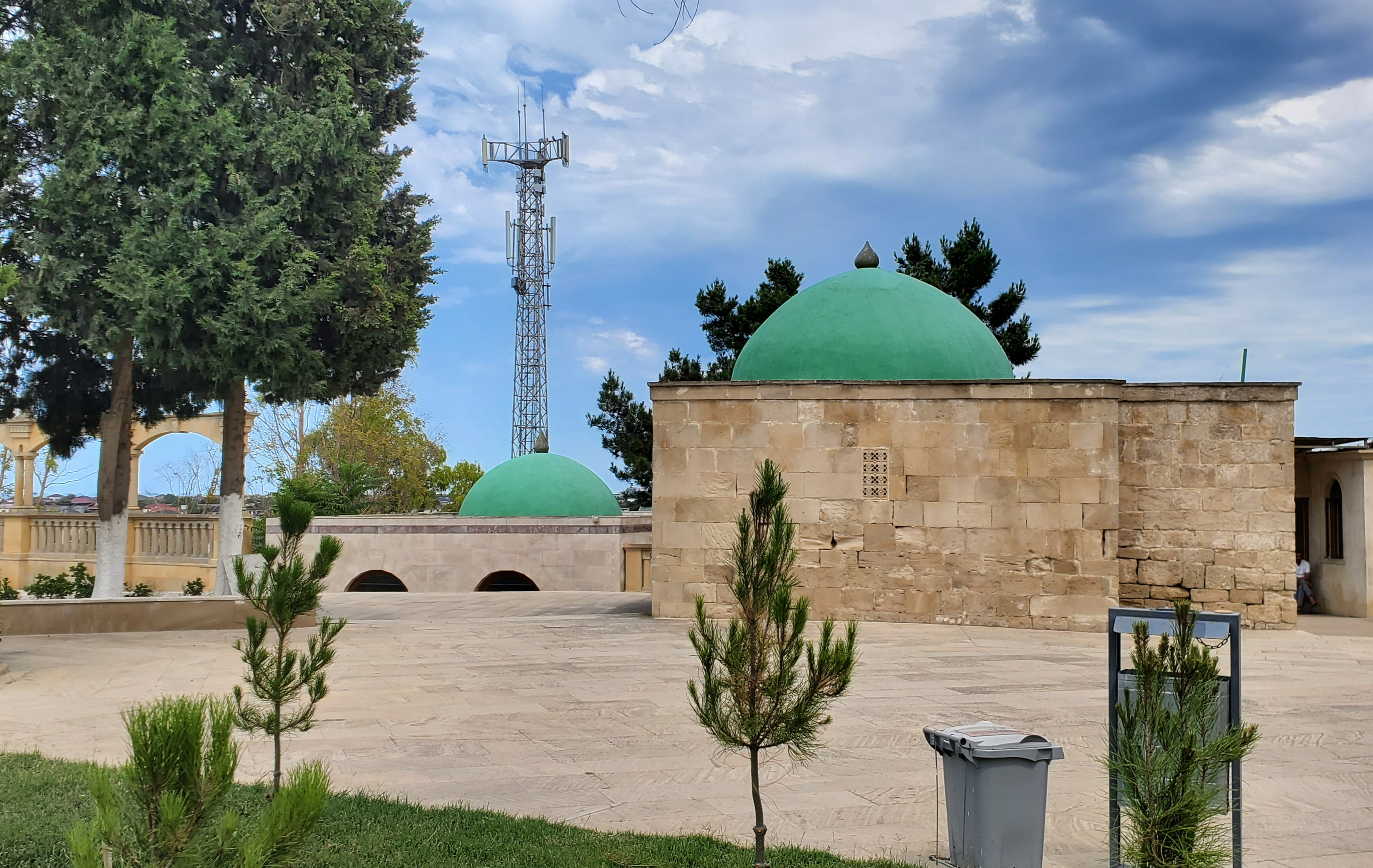
- Villa of Murtuza Mukhtarov Quadrangular Mardakan Fortress Heydar Juma Mosque Mardakan-Zaghulba Highway Pir Hasan Mausoleum
- Location of Mardakan
- Location of Mardakan in Azerbaijan Location of Mardakan in the Caucasus Location of Mardakan in Asia
- Coordinates: 40°29′32″N 50°08′20″E
- Country: Azerbaijan
- City: Baku
- Rayon: Khazar
- Named for: Mard tribe

Government
  - Body: Khazar Rayon Executive Power
  - Mayor: Huseynov Mirbaba Miri-oglu
  - Representative: Mugbilov Ilgar Shahbala-oglu

Area
  - Municipality: 17.9 km^{2} (6.9 sq mi)
- Elevation: −10 m (−33 ft)
- Highest elevation (Baku Airport Highway): 17 m (56 ft)
- Lowest elevation (Caspian Sea): −32 m (−105 ft)

Population (2023)
  - Municipality: 32,084
  - Rank: 3rd
  - Density: 1,790/km^{2} (4,640/sq mi)
  - Metro: 3,675,000
- Demonym: Mardakanly (Mərdəkanlı)
- Time zone: UTC+4 (AZT)
- Postal code: AZ1044, AZ1076
- Area code: +994 12
- ISO 3166 code: AZ-BA
- Vehicle registration: 90, 99, 70
- Website: xazar-ih.gov.az

Mardakan (Azerbaijani: Mərdəkan, pronounced [mæɾdæˈkɑn]) is a settlement and municipality in Khazar Rayon of Baku, Azerbaijan, located on the coast of the Caspian Sea, with a population of 32,084. It's positioned on the eastern Absheron Peninsula, about 30 km away from downtown Baku, and just 10 km from Heydar Aliyev International Airport, bounded by Shuvalan to the east, Qala to the south, and Shagan to the west. It also borders Bina in the south-west, and Buzovna to the north-west. Mardakan is the third largest settlement in Khazar Rayon by population, and one of the most populated municipalities in the country. It is considered to be the center of the Khazar Rayon, with the district's office being located in the settlement.

Widely regarded and known across the peninsula as a resort town, Mardakan attracts thousands of visitors every year during the summertime. It is praised for its beaches, a generally pleasant climate, and an abundance of recreational establishments. It occupies a portion of the northern part of the Khazar Rayon, although the municipality's territory was adjusted multiple times throughout its history. Mardakan was granted the status of a settlement in 1936. In 1933, Shagan village was incorporated into the Mardakan municipal council, however, Shagan was separated in 1945, only to be reunited with Mardakan in 1948. Finally, in 1994, Shagan once again became independent and was granted the status of a settlement.

== Etymology ==
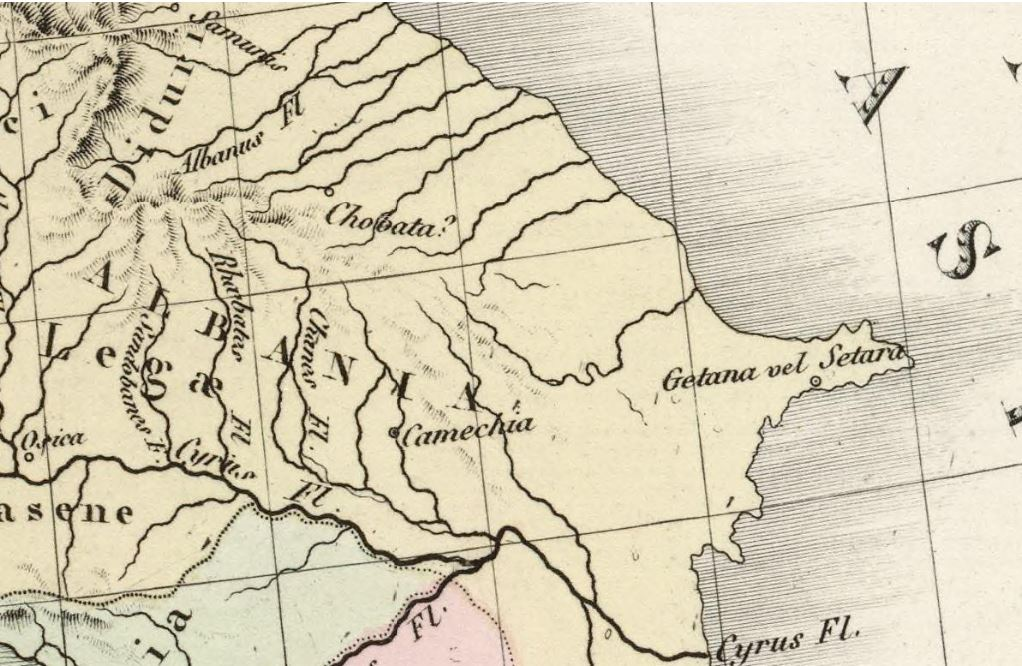
Map of Caucasian Albania

Name of Mardakan is believed to originate from the phrase "place of the Mards", which suggests that the settlement was originally established by the ancient Mard tribes. While there are alternative interpretations of the settlement's name, the most accepted meaning in Azerbaijani is "Mərdlər məkanı." The earliest mention of the Mards appears in historical accounts describing the tribes that inhabited Caucasian Albania. Archaeological discoveries near Mardakan, including bows, tools, and other artifacts dating back to the Bronze Age (3rd-2nd millennia BC), provide further evidence of early human settlement in the area. Additionally, traces of ancient dwellings have been found, indicating that Mardakan has been continuously inhabited for thousands of years. Ethnographic research has led to different interpretations of the origin of the name "Mardakan." Some scholars link it to the Mard tribe, while others argue that it originates from the term "Mardi place," a phrase derived from the linguistic traditions of the local population. The name is also discussed in historical studies conducted by Sara Khanum Ashurbeyli, a distinguished Baku-based historian and expert in historical sciences. According to her research, the toponym "Mardakan" is directly associated with the Mard tribe, which once resided in the region.

== History ==
Mardakan is one of the oldest villages of the Absheron peninsula. Several traces of ancient settlements have been discovered close to the village. Some rocks in the area have paintings typical to the Bronze Age. Alongside these rock paintings, Mardakan is home to a variety of old castles and fortifications. It boasts a history that stretches back to prehistory, with evidence of early human activity in the region. In antiquity, the territory of Mardakan was part of Caucasian Albania, a state established around 2nd century BC, home to the Albanian tribes, whose presence in the region left a lasting cultural impact. The region was likely known for its strategic location along the Caspian Sea, offering both defense and trade advantages. In the 4th century AD, following the decline of Caucasian Albania, Mardakan and its surroundings came under the control of the Sasanian Empire, which dominated much of the Caucasus, influencing the region with Zoroastrianism. Territories of Caucasian Albania would ultimately become a part of the empire, forming a province of Caucasian Albania. Mardakan would also be under the control of the First Turkic Khaganate, or the Göktürks, a Turkic state that occupied large portions of Central Asia, modern-day Mongolia, and the territories of Goguryeo, a Korean kingdom which experienced several altercations with Turkic populations of the state.

By the 7th century, the Arab Caliphates expanded into the region, ushering in the Islamic era and leaving a profound imprint on the religious and cultural landscape. Over the next few centuries, the Seljuk Empire took hold in the 11th century, followed by the rise of Mongol empires in the 13th century, which shifted the political dynamics of the region yet again, bringing Mardakan under the rule of the Mongol Empire and its successor states, such as the Qara Qoyunlu and Aq Qoyunlu. Around the same time, Mardakan would partially be controlled by the Shirvanshahs, which expanded their influence beyond their original possessions. By the 16th century, the Safavid Empire, established its dominance over Mardakan. During much of the 18th century, territory of the settlement would be under the control of the Khanates of the Caucasus (also referred to as Azerbaijani khanates and Iranian khanates), mainly the Baku Khanate, which occupied a majority of the Absheron Peninsula. The absorption of the region into the Russian Empire in the 19th century, after the Treaty of Gulistan (1813) and the Treaty of Turkmenchay (1828), marked a significant shift, as Russian rule laid the foundations for modern infrastructure and industrialization, particularly in the oil sector. Azerbaijan Democratic Republic, the direct predecessor to modern Republic of Azerbaijan, would declare its independence in 1918, and would solidify its rule over Baku and the territories of Absheron following their victory in the Battle of Baku. Following the Soviet Union's formation in the early 20th century, Mardakan, along with the rest of Azerbaijan, became part of the Azerbaijan Soviet Socialist Republic, during which time the region saw significant development, especially with the growth of Baku as a global oil hub. When the Soviet Union dissolved in 1991, Azerbaijan gained independence, and Mardakan became part of the newly sovereign Republic of Azerbaijan.

=== Fortifications ===
Mardakan Fortress was built in the mid-12th to 14th centuries, according to various sources, by the order of Shirvanshah Akhsitan I in commemoration of a victory over a defeated enemy. The fortress was primarily used as a military post and an observation point. Standing at a height of 22 meters, the Mardakan Fortress is a significant example of the defensive architecture of the period. It served not only as a fortification but also as a strategic lookout for the surrounding area. The fortress is part of the broader network of defensive structures built along the Absheron Peninsula during the era. It was featured in the UNESCO World Heritage Reserve List. In addition to these fortifications, several other historical structures remain, including mosques, bathhouses, and residential buildings, which offer insights into the social, religious, and architectural practices of the time. These structures reflect the area's cultural heritage during the medieval period.

=== Modern era ===
During the Soviet era, the area underwent further development, becoming a popular destination for sanatoriums and summer residences. This period contributed to the area's growing role as a retreat location, introducing modern infrastructure while maintaining its historical character. Mardakan was visited by a Russian poet Sergei Yesenin in 1924–1925 as a part of his trip to Azerbaijan, where he stayed in the settlement for an extended period of time, from where he published poems. "I cannot live without Baku and Bakuvians for long" claimed Yesenin during his stay in Absheron. His legacy is still remembered and cherished in the settlement to this day. One of the main streets that runs across Mardakan is named after him, and on the initiative of Heydar Aliyev, Sergey Yesenin's house museum was opened and inaugurated on April 1, 1975, to commemorate Yesenin's 80th anniversary. Today, the area combines its historical landmarks with contemporary development. Ongoing efforts to preserve its cultural and architectural heritage ensure that it remains an important location for both residents and visitors. The area continues to serve as a place that blends its past with modern amenities, reflecting its historical significance and its role in current-day life. The settlement became one of the most desirable locations for many Bakuvians to settle in, and to this day, remains as one of the most prosperous and developed municipalities not only in Khazar Rayon, but also in the Absheron Peninsula as a whole. According to the survey conducted by ACT Azerbaijan, 18% of Baku residents (majority) wish to own a suburban mansion/villa in Mardakan, with Novkhani, Bilgah, Buzovna, Shuvalan and Pirshagi coming after.

== Education ==
Special School of the State Border Service

Mardakan is home to several educational institutions, including two secondary schools, numbered 183 and 181, that offer general education in subjects such as mathematics, sciences, literature, and foreign languages, including English, German and Russian. The town also has multiple kindergartens that focus on early childhood education. Not that far away from Mardakan locates the primary school of ADA University, known as the "ADA Primary School," educating children from 1–5 grade. Mardakan also features the Special School of the State Border Service, established to support the development of Azerbaijan's border security forces, operating under the jurisdiction of the State Border Service of Azerbaijan. It is one of the only special schools of the State Border Service currently operating in Azerbaijan. Mardakan is also home to the Police Academy of the Ministry of Internal Affairs of the Republic of Azerbaijan, which was established in 1921 by the decision of the Council of People's Commissars of Azerbaijan SSR. The institution operated in the heart of Baku until 1936, when it was relocated to the settlement. Additionally, Mardakan benefits from its proximity to downtown Baku, providing residents with access to a broader range of educational opportunities, including specialized schools, universities, and vocational training centers. Institutions of higher education such as Khazar University and the National Aviation Academy are located in proximity to the settlement. The latter is particularly close, as it is adjacent to Heydar Aliyev International Airport.

== Economy ==
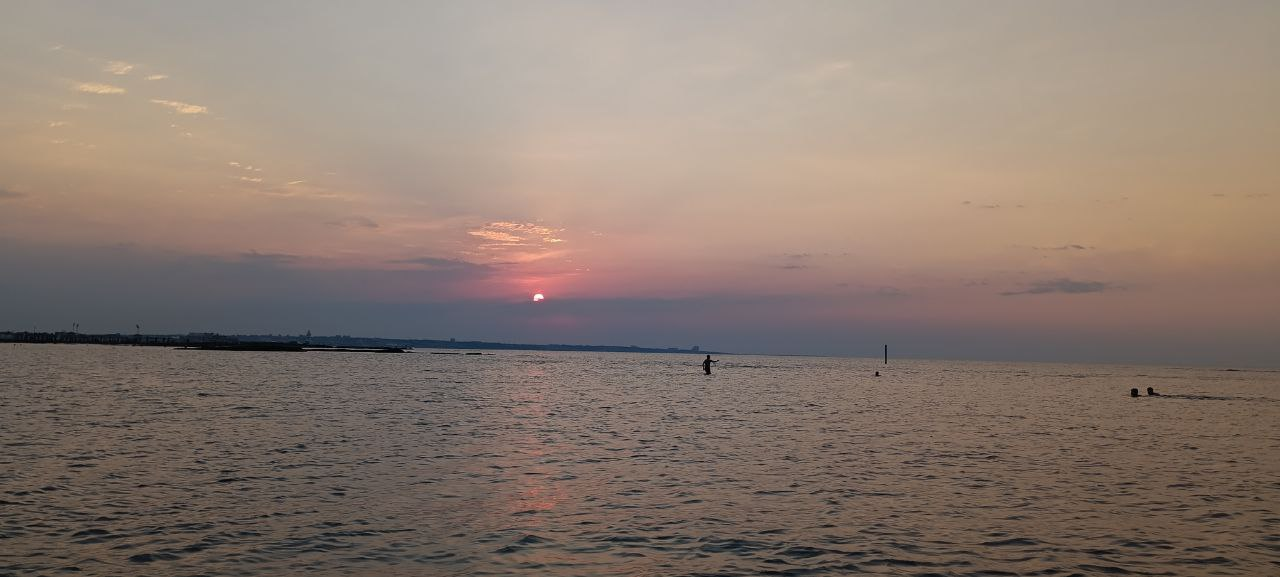
Mardakan beach

Mardakan's economy is largely supported by private businesses, including restaurants, cafes, bakeries, and other small businesses that serve both the local population and tourists. The area experiences a high level of economic activity in the summer period, driven by the influx of tourists from the surrounding areas, and the popularity of its leisure and recreation facilities. Other than tourism services, labor is a significant driver of the local economy. Construction of buildings, swimming pools, house building, and maintenance are also a common source of employment, particularly with the ongoing construction of private homes and holiday homes in the area.

== Culture ==
=== Architecture ===
Mardakan possesses a distinctive cultural and architectural character shaped by historic as well as local conditions. The urbanized area of the settlement comprises a blend of Soviet residential complexes and traditional Absheron architecture elements set against the backdrop of its history in the broader context of Azerbaijani urbanization. The low-density residential housing comprising villas and private houses constitutes the majority of the skyline. Over the past few years, the settlement has undergone progressive urbanisation, with modern architectural designs progressively replacing older structures.

=== Museums ===
Mardakan is home to several significant museums that reflect its rich history and cultural heritage. Located on the territory of the campus of the State Border Service's Special School, the Heydar Aliyev Museum is dedicated to the former president of Azerbaijan, Heydar Aliyev, and highlights his life and legacy. Another vital museum is the Botany Museum within the Mardakan Arboretum, which was established by celebrated botanist Nikolai Vavilov. The museum showcases a vast collection of plant species from Azerbaijan and around the world. The Sergei Yesenin Museum, also located within the arboretum, honors the Russian poet who was visiting Mardakan during the early 20th century.

=== Sports ===
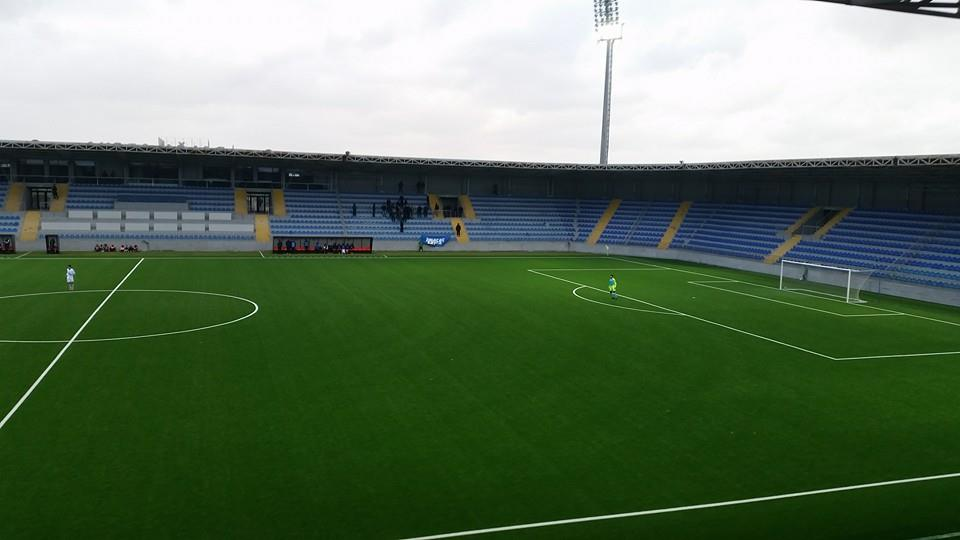
Liv Bona Dea Arena

Football, or soccer, like in the rest of the country is by far the most popular sport in Mardakan, featuring multiple free-access pitches available for public use. Although football is the dominant sport in Mardakan, with the municipality accommodating more than 30,000 residents, and featuring good-quality football facilities, it has not hosted a professional football club yet. Beach volleyball and volleyball in general is also one of the sports with a significant following. Beach volleyball is played in Mardakan on regular basis, mostly due to the fact that the settlement includes beaches suitable for the sport along its shoreline. Mardakan has also hosted multiple footvolley and volleyball tournaments, primarily on the territory of Dalga Beach.

Mardakan is home to Dalga Arena, which hosts matches played by the Azerbaijani national football team, as well as other Azerbaijani Premier League clubs. Dalga Arena, or Liv Bona Dea Arena for sponsorship reasons, was officially opened on June 6, 2011, with a ceremony attended by notable figures, including FIFA President Sepp Blatter, UEFA President Michel Platini, and AFFA President Rovnag Abdullayev. The event marked the inauguration of a major football venue in Azerbaijan, situated near the Caspian Sea. The stadium is part of the AFFA Football Center, which also includes two full-sized artificial turf training pitches, a beach football stadium, and the Football Academy. The arena with a seating capacity of 6,500 was one of the venues for the 2012 FIFA U-17 Women's World Cup, and has since become a key facility for both local and international sporting events. The pitch is certified with FIFA quality standards. During the opening ceremony, FIFA, UEFA, and AFFA representatives toured the stadium and watched a training session involving youth national teams.

Beyond the arena, the region supports various sports and activities, with facilities designed to foster local talent and host national and international events. The development of sports infrastructure continues to grow, with improvements in venues and training centers contributing to the region's sports culture. These efforts are part of a broader initiative to elevate the area's role in Azerbaijani sports, creating more opportunities for both professional athletes and the community to engage in sporting activities.

== Demographics ==
Historical population
| Year | Pop. | ±% |
|---|---|---|
| 2015 | 15,267 | — |
| 2020 | 25,232 | +65.3% |
| 2023 | 32,084 | +27.2% |
Source: Khazar Rayon Executive Power

Mardakan is home to a population that is predominantly Azerbaijani. In addition to the majority population, there are also minority groups such as Lezgins, Tats, and Russians residing in the area, which have been a part of the Absheron Peninsula for a long time and represented themselves in the demographic composition of the area for many years, though their numbers have diminished over the years.

Mardakan currently has approximately 32,000 residents, an increase of about 25,000 in 2020. The area has been experiencing a consistent rise in population due to urbanization, its proximity to the central districts, and the development of infrastructure. With the quick growth, it's projected that Mardakan will soon exceed 40,000 residents if the trend is left unchecked. The population growth is Mardakan is faster in comparison to other municipalities in the region. The primary contributors are new developments, increased migration to the area, and increasingly more families choosing to live in Mardakan, mainly due to better living conditions, and the settlements centralized location.

=== Religion ===
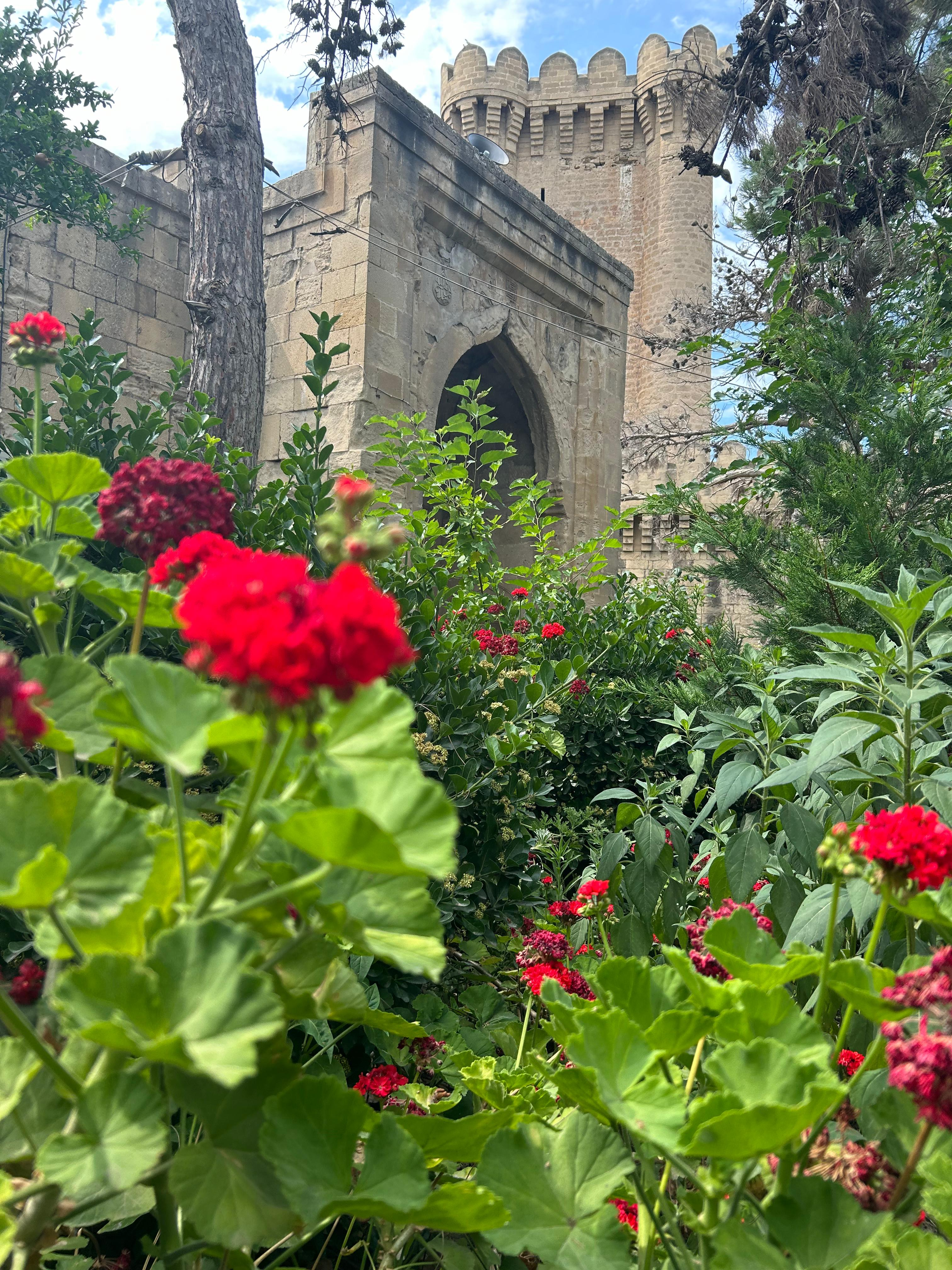
Tuba Shahi Mosque with the Quadrangular Mardakan Fortress, also known as the Great Mardakan Castle, in the background

Mardakan is home to a number of mosques, some of which are significant like the Tuba Shahi Mosque, dating back to the 1400s, and Heydar Juma Mosque. The latter has been functioning since 1893, and underwent a major renovation in 2012 which was overseen by the Heydar Aliyev Foundation. Previously a one-storied building, the mosque was expanded with the addition of a second floor, allowing it to accommodate 130 people at a time. The renovation also included the creation of two ablution rooms, a library, a madrasa, a ceremony room for 180 people, and various auxiliary rooms, along with the construction of a minaret. The inauguration of the mosque was attended by the Vice President of Azerbaijan Mehriban Aliyeva.

The majority of the population identifies as Muslim, as is the case with the religious dynamic of Azerbaijan. However, similar to downtown Baku, it is unlikely that many residents are actively practicing Islam, and for a majority it's viewed as a cultural identity rather than religious. In addition to the Muslim majority, there is a small Christian population in Mardakan, but they are in a minority. Atheism and agnosticism have become more popular in recent years among the youth. Secularism and a more liberal thought process are increasingly being embraced by youths in Mardakan.

== Places of interest ==
The main points of interest of Mardakan are its castles with watchtowers, technically being keeps. There are two keeps - one being the Round Mardakan Fortress, also known as the Small Mardakan Castle, built in 1232 at the order of the Shirvanshah Fariburz III, and the Quadrangular Mardakan Fortress. When enemies attacked, the tops of these towers were lit up with oil to warn the population of the approaching danger. The main objective of the small castle however was to deter Russian pirates, who were raiding the settlement from the north of the peninsula. The round tower was built in the 13th century and is 15.5 meters in diameter with three stories. The quadrangular tower dates from 14th century and is about 25 meters tall with five stories. These towers are parts of the general chain of towers and other fortresses over the Absheron Peninsula.

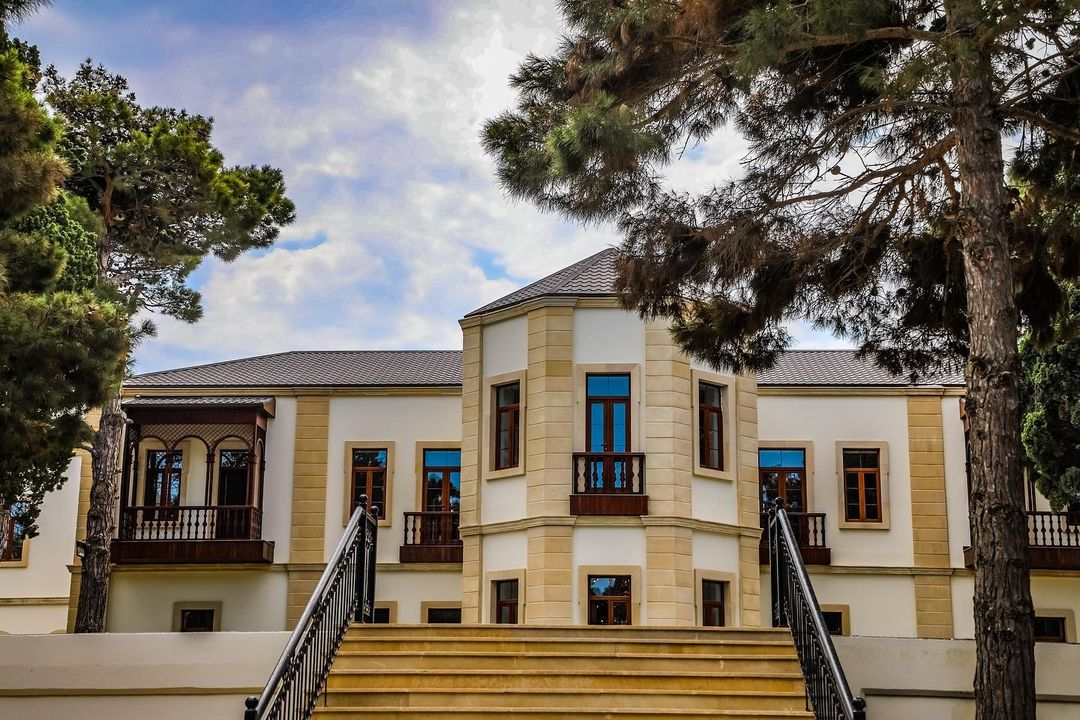
Zeynalabdin Taghiyev's summer house

Mardakan is a place to build dacha summer cottages for Baku residents. The tradition to build cottages in Mardakan dates back to the 19th century when business magnates from the emerging oil industry began to build extravagant summer houses. Nowadays, the construction boom in Mardakan continues with a wave of newly made generation of businessmen, who keep the tradition of transforming old Absheron style architecture dachas with architecture from Europe, such as French and Mediterranean house building manner. For a long time, Mardakan was considered an affordable place to purchase land. However, in recent months, acquiring land has become more expensive as available plots have become scarcer. Mardakan is now one of the most expensive areas to buy land, but despite this, the trend of purchasing land and constructing houses continues to be strong and remains prevalent today. As in old days, French architecture used to stand out among all other architecture styles followed in the construction of summer cottages, with a whole new White City project in down town of the capital of Azerbaijan, which is purely French architecture. Nowadays, the practice of building houses that lean toward a more contemporary architecture and modernist style is becoming more popular.

The town is known for its extensive beaches along the Caspian Sea, offering sandy shorelines and clear waters that are suitable for sunbathing, swimming, and walking. One of the main attractions is Dalga Beach, an aquapark that features water slides, pools, and various aquatic activities, along with cafes, restaurants, and sun loungers. In addition to Dalga Beach, the region is home to several other beaches that provide a more tranquil atmosphere, making Mardakan a popular destination for both recreational and leisurely activities by the sea. The settlement's beaches are often said to be one of the most favourable locations for swimming in the regions, as the waves of the Caspian Sea aren't as harsh as they are in nearby areas, especially in the eastern corner of the Khazar Rayon, and the harsh winds of the which are primarily seen on the southern edge of the peninsula, specifically within the proximity of central Baku, which is also named the "City of Winds."

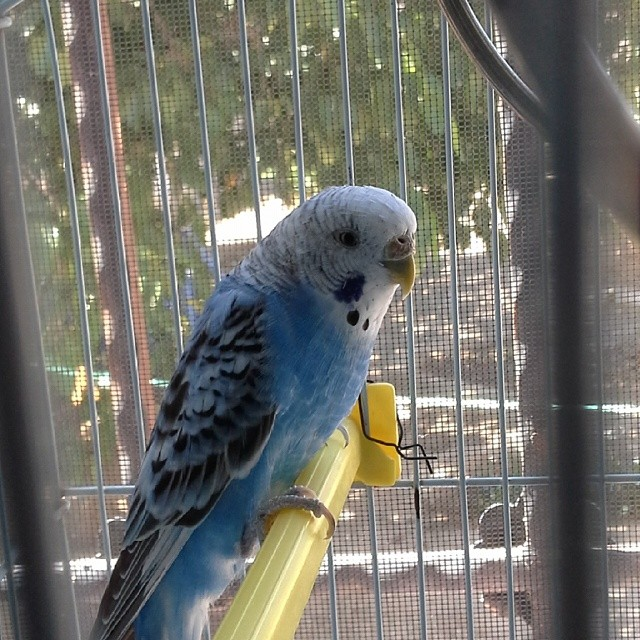
Blue budgie parakeet in the Mardakan Arboretum

Mardakan has a favourable microclimate for growing fruits and vegetables. This has attracted several plantations, one of them being the Mardakan Arboretum, which was established in 1926 by Nikolai Vavilov. The Dendrology Garden is home to over 10,000 plants, encompassing more than 700 species. Among them are rare and endangered trees, greenhouse plants, grasses, and flowers. As a scientific-research institute, the garden plays a crucial role in expanding and preserving the plant gene pool in Azerbaijan, since Azerbaijan is an active participator in the Global Strategy for Plant Conservation program, launched by the United Nations. In addition to studying the biological characteristics of trees and shrubs from various countries, researchers focus on their adaptation to the Absheron Peninsula's dry subtropical climate, their introduction, and their contribution to enriching the region's flora. The age of these plants is determined in specialized laboratories without cutting down or damaging old trees in the garden. Efforts are also underway to develop an electronic database cataloging all old trees in the country. The garden features Eldar pine trees that are over 130 years old and Aleppo pine trees that have stood for 170 years. It is believed that these trees were planted during the construction of the garden in Murtuza Mukhtarov's time. From 1895 to 1920, Mardakan Arboretum served as the private garden of petroleum millionaire and philanthropist Murtuza Mukhtarov. In 1925, it was transferred to state ownership and, over the years, functioned under various institutions, including the Ministry of Health, the experimental base of the All-Union Institute of Applied Botany (now known as the Vavilov Institute of Plant Industry), the All-Union Institute of Botany, the experimental station for subtropical plants, and the S.E. Institute of Horticulture, Viticulture, and Subtropical Plants. Between 1966 and 1996, it became part of the scientific structure of the Botanical Institute of the Azerbaijan Academy of Sciences. Since 1996, the Mardakan Arboretum has been under the Division of Biological Sciences and gained legal status. In 2014, it was renamed the Dendrology Institute, and on January 7, 2022, it was officially designated as a Public Legal Entity by a decision of the Cabinet of Ministers. Currently, the area is undergoing a reconstruction effort.

Other key attractions include:

- The Tuba Shahi Mosque from the 15th century
- The house and museum of Sergei Yesenin
- The summer house and grave of the oil magnate Zeynalabdin Taghiyev

== Transportation ==
=== Airport ===
Mardakan is connected to the surrounding areas through an established transportation network. Baku Airport Highway serves Mardakan and the Heydar Aliyev International Airport as the main road connecting the two to the main urban center of the capital city. Heydar Aliyev International Airport, the busiest airport in the Caucasus region, serves the Baku Metropolitan Area which also includes the municipality of Mardakan. The settlement's sky is very busy, as majority of the time it serves as a passageway for many airplanes which fly over the territory of Azerbaijan into the Caspian Sea. It is also one of the closest municipalities within the metropolitan area to the airport.

=== Bus ===
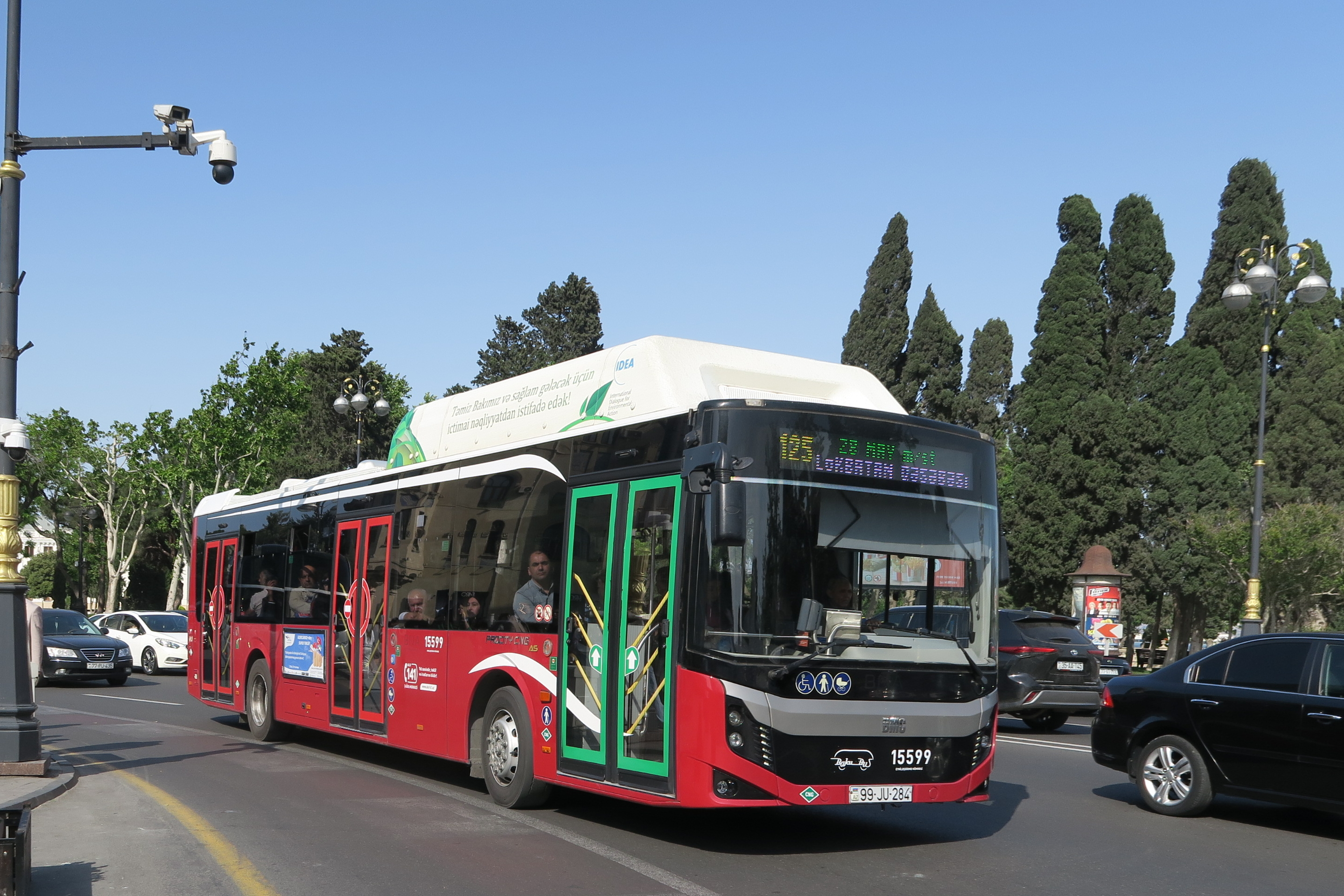
BakuBus vehicle, used by the 140E route busses

Public bus services are one of the primary modes of transit, including the 140E BakuBus route, which links Mardakan to Nizami Rayon. The route starts at Koroglu Metro Station, and travels along the Boyuk Shor and Baku Airport Highways, passing right next to the Heydar Aliyev International Airport until it eventually reaches Mardakan. Alongside Mardakan, it also passes through Shuvalan. Several other bus routes connect Mardakan to nearby settlements on the Absheron Peninsula, such as Qala, Bilgah, Pirshagi, and Zira. Private minibuses (marshrutkas) operate alongside public buses, providing additional connections to less accessible areas. Taxis and ride-hailing services are also available, offering alternative transportation options.

=== Bike ===
Recently, the Khazar Rayon Executive Power opted to install bike lanes across the settlement in order to promote the usage of bikes. Based on the project provided by the Baku Transport Agency, "Baku Abadlig" LLC constructed 8.2 km of bicycle paths and pedestrian sidewalks along the Buzovna-Mardakan highway, also known as the "New Road" among the local population. It stretches from the north-west point of Mardakan and travels all the way to the Mardakan Circle which connects Shuvalan and Qala to the municipality.

== Climate ==
The municipality of Mardakan has a mid-latitude semi-arid climate. It experiences hot, dry summers with temperatures often reaching over 30°C (86°F) in July, while winters are mild with average lows around 4°C (40°F) in February. Mardakan usually experiences its hottest weather during July and August, while the settlement's coldest days are usually felt in January to February. Precipitation is quite low, averaging about 15 mm annually, and most of it falls in October. The region experiences around 40 rainy days a year, which makes up just over 10% of the year, and the area is also known for its breezy conditions, especially during the summer months. The overall climate is sunny and dry, with mild winters. Mardakan's temperature is 2.79% higher than Azerbaijan's averages.

Climate data for Mardakan
| Month | Jan | Feb | Mar | Apr | May | Jun | Jul | Aug | Sep | Oct | Nov | Dec | Year |
|---|---|---|---|---|---|---|---|---|---|---|---|---|---|
| Record high °C (°F) | 17.5 (63.5) | 18.55 (65.39) | 22.67 (72.81) | 26.8 (80.2) | 30.9 (87.6) | 37.0 (98.6) | 39.16 (102.49) | 39.16 (102.49) | 32.0 (89.6) | 21.64 (70.95) | 29.9 (85.8) | 17.5 (63.5) | 39.16 (102.49) |
| Mean daily maximum °C (°F) | 8.3 (46.9) | 7.95 (46.31) | 11.3 (52.3) | 15.5 (59.9) | 22.5 (72.5) | 28.0 (82.4) | 30.5 (86.9) | 30.5 (86.9) | 26.14 (79.05) | 13.75 (56.75) | 20.0 (68.0) | 10.2 (50.4) | 18.72 (65.69) |
| Daily mean °C (°F) | 7.0 (44.6) | 6.6 (43.9) | 9.5 (49.1) | 13.6 (56.5) | 20.7 (69.3) | 26.4 (79.5) | 29.1 (84.4) | 29.0 (84.2) | 24.76 (76.57) | 12.6 (54.7) | 18.7 (65.7) | 9.14 (48.45) | 17.26 (63.08) |
| Mean daily minimum °C (°F) | 5.14 (41.25) | 4.5 (40.1) | 6.8 (44.2) | 10.5 (50.9) | 17.35 (63.23) | 23.3 (73.9) | 26.15 (79.07) | 26.3 (79.3) | 22.5 (72.5) | 10.72 (51.30) | 16.66 (61.99) | 7.4 (45.3) | 14.78 (58.59) |
| Record low °C (°F) | −7.2 (19.0) | −5.15 (22.73) | 0.0 (32.0) | 4.1 (39.4) | 7.2 (45.0) | 16.5 (61.7) | 18.55 (65.39) | 15.46 (59.83) | 11.34 (52.41) | −1.0 (30.2) | −7.2 (19.0) | −2.06 (28.29) | −7.2 (19.0) |
| Average precipitation mm (inches) | 18 (0.7) | 19.6 (0.77) | 12.56 (0.49) | 9 (0.4) | 9.57 (0.38) | 6.1 (0.24) | 4.7 (0.19) | 3.56 (0.14) | 8.85 (0.35) | 28.2 (1.11) | 17 (0.7) | 18.3 (0.72) | 155.44 (6.19) |
| Average rainy days | 4.8 | 4.8 | 3.46 | 2.34 | 3.56 | 2.25 | 1.4 | 0.66 | 2.15 | 6.37 | 4 | 3.94 | 39.73 |
| Average relative humidity (%) | 75.5 | 77.0 | 74.0 | 68.54 | 63.24 | 55.54 | 55.57 | 54.6 | 61.65 | 73.44 | 70.6 | 75.4 | 67.09 |
| Mean daily sunshine hours | 6.7 | 8.9 | 10.4 | 12.4 | 14.4 | 15 | 14.76 | 13.67 | 11.37 | 6.9 | 9 | 7 | 10.88 |
Source: Weather and Climate

== Notable natives ==
- Chimnaz Aslanova, Azerbaijani educator, stateswoman and politician.
- Vagif Rakhmanov, Azerbaijani sculptor and graphic artist, Honored Artist of Kazakhstan.
- Maral Rahmanzadeh, Azerbaijani graphic artist and painter.
- Zeynalabdin Taghiyev, Azerbaijani national industrial magnate and philanthropist.
- Gylman Ilkin, Azerbaijani writer, editor and pedagogue, People's Writer of Azerbaijan.

== International relations ==
=== Twin towns – Sister cities ===
Mardakan is twinned with

- Nadarzyn, Poland

== Photos ==
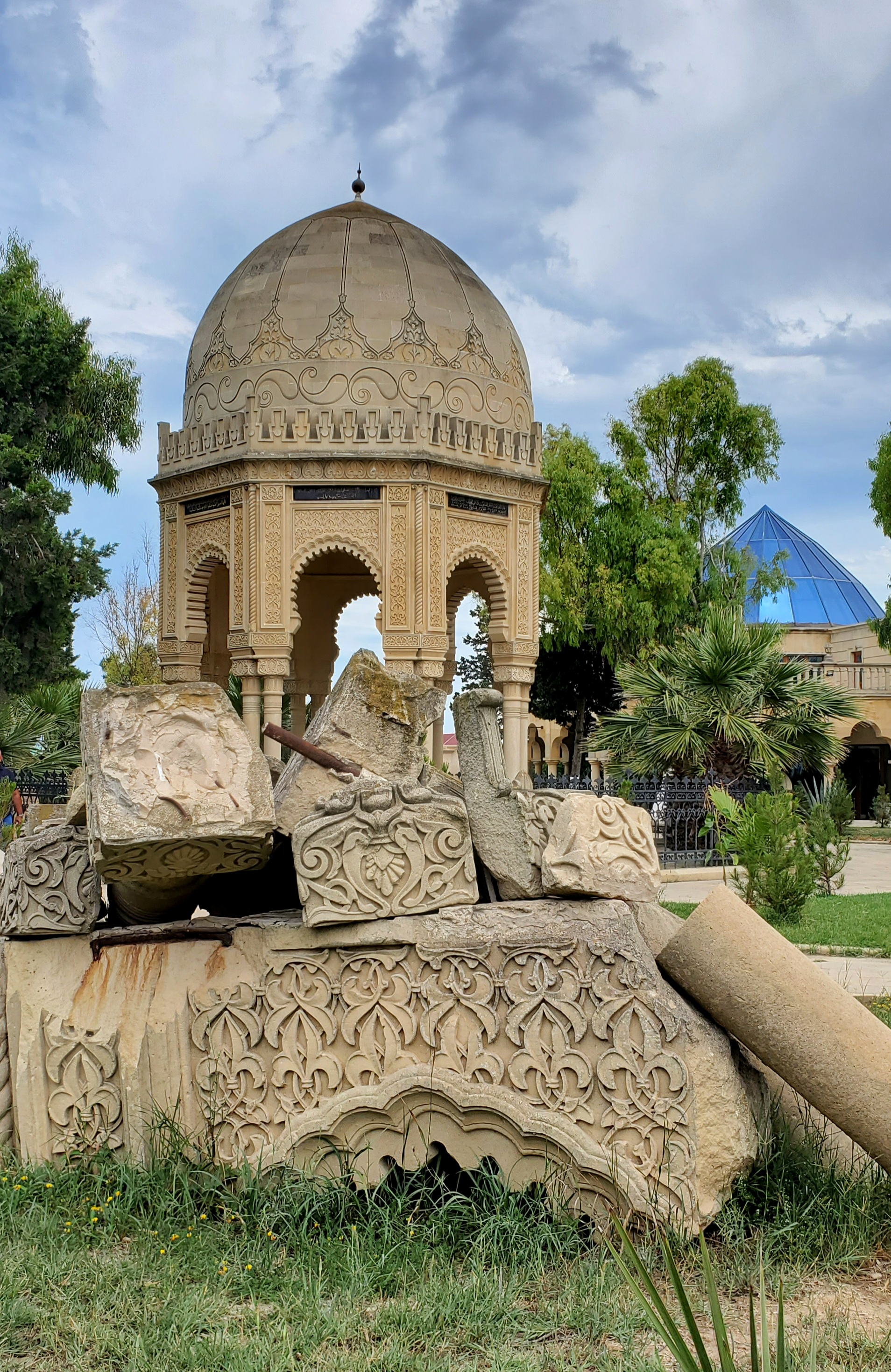
Akhund Abuturab Mausoleum

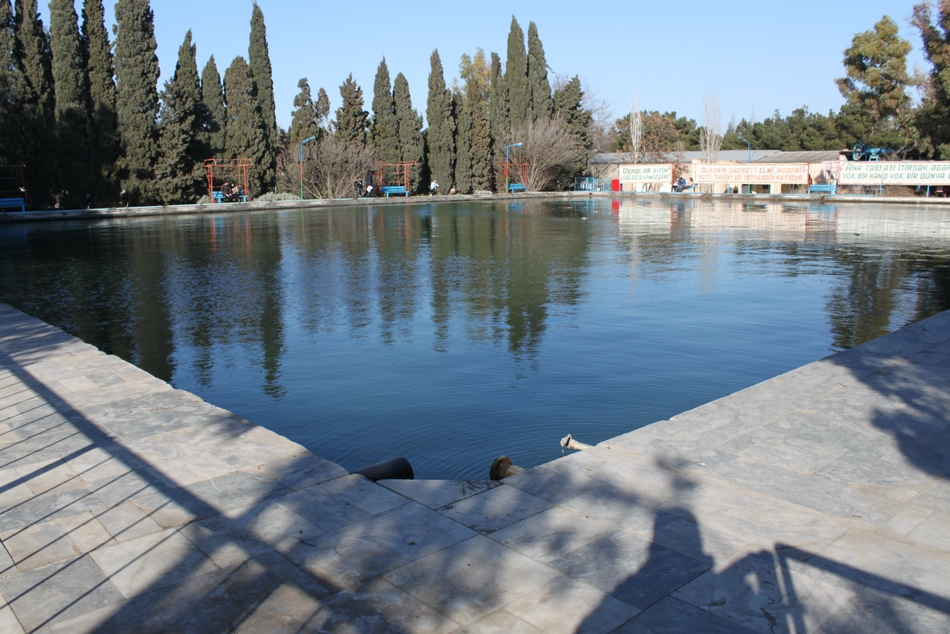
Mardakan Arboretum.

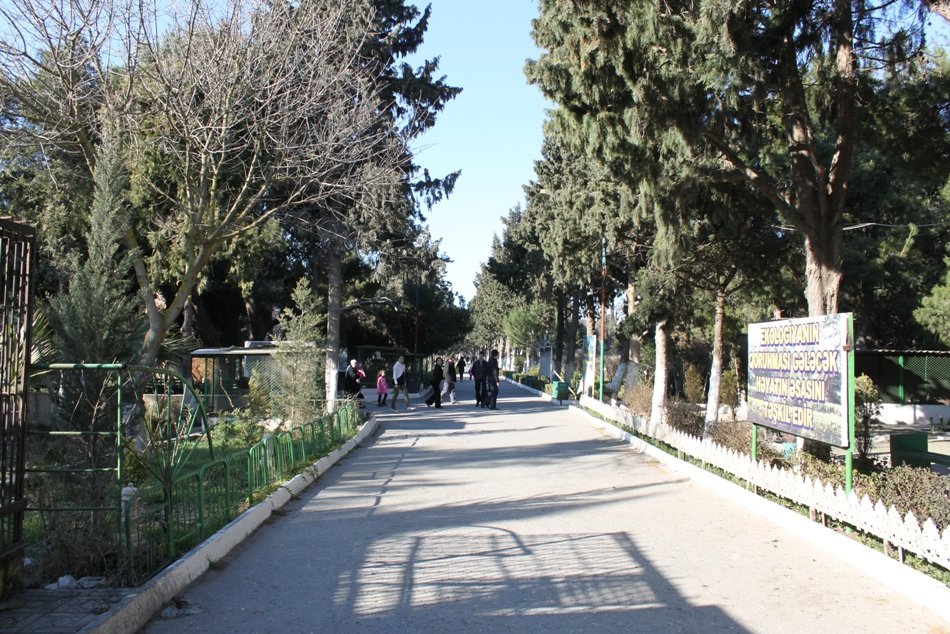
Mardakan Arboretum.

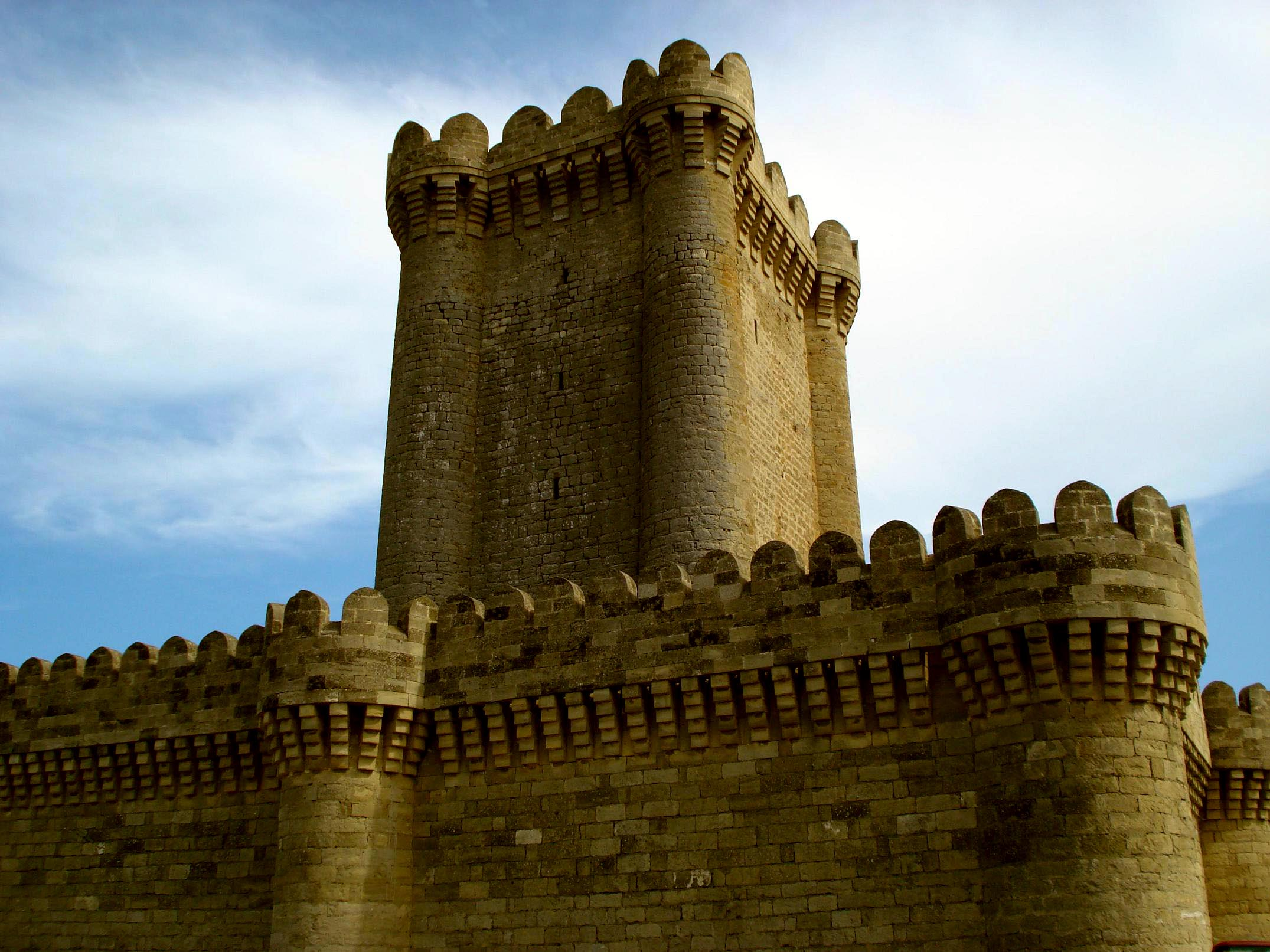
Mardakan castle.

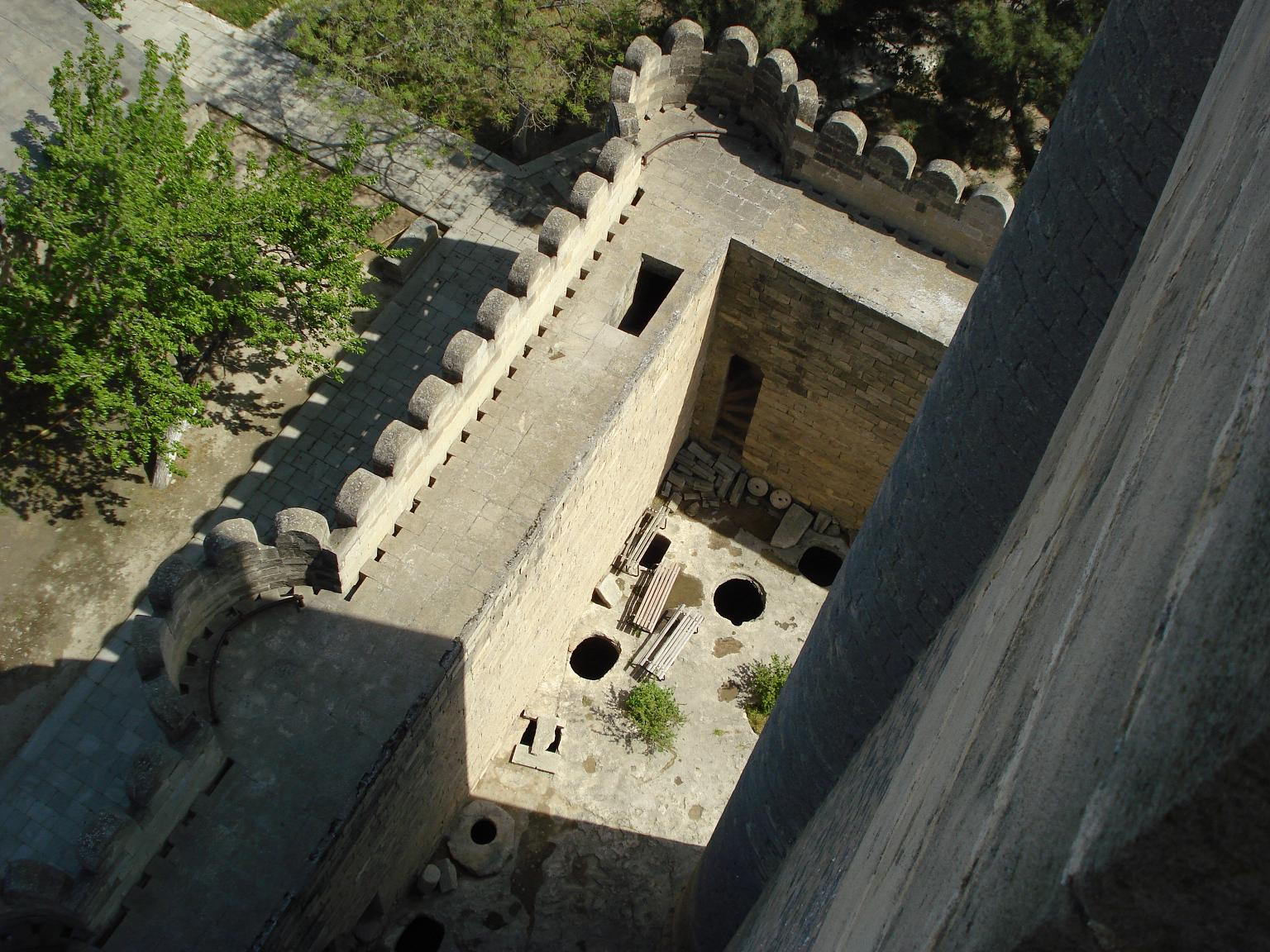
Mardakan castle.

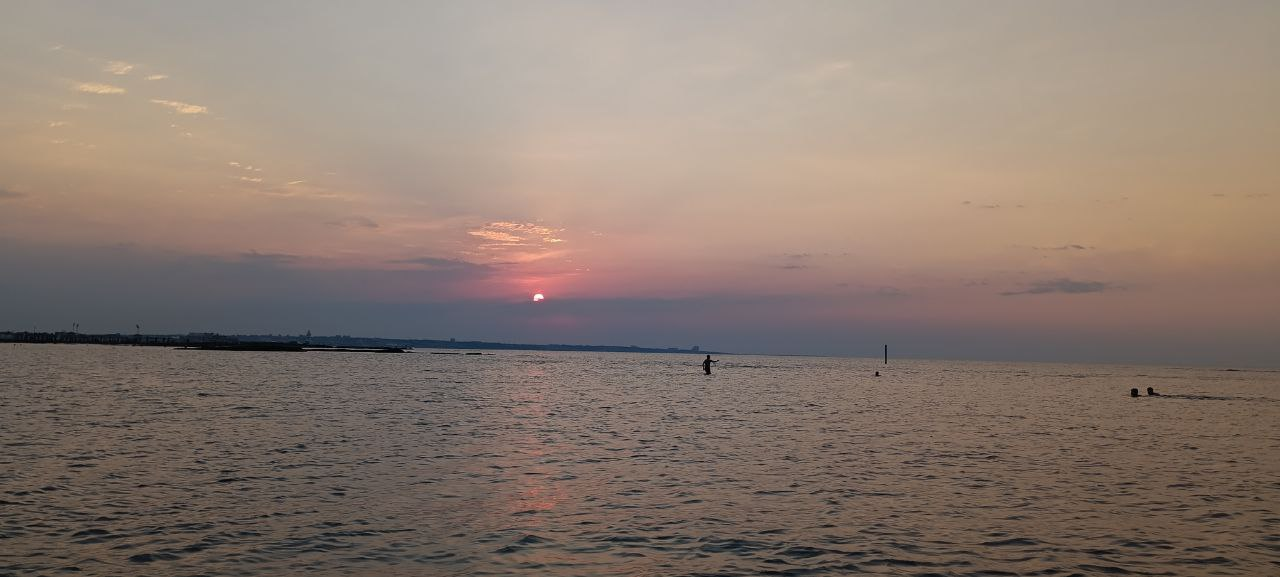
Mardakan beach
