= Tuba Shahi Mosque =

Former mosque in Mərdəkan, Baku, Azerbaijan

- Azerbaijani: Tuba-Şahi məscidi; Persian: مسجد طوبا شاهی
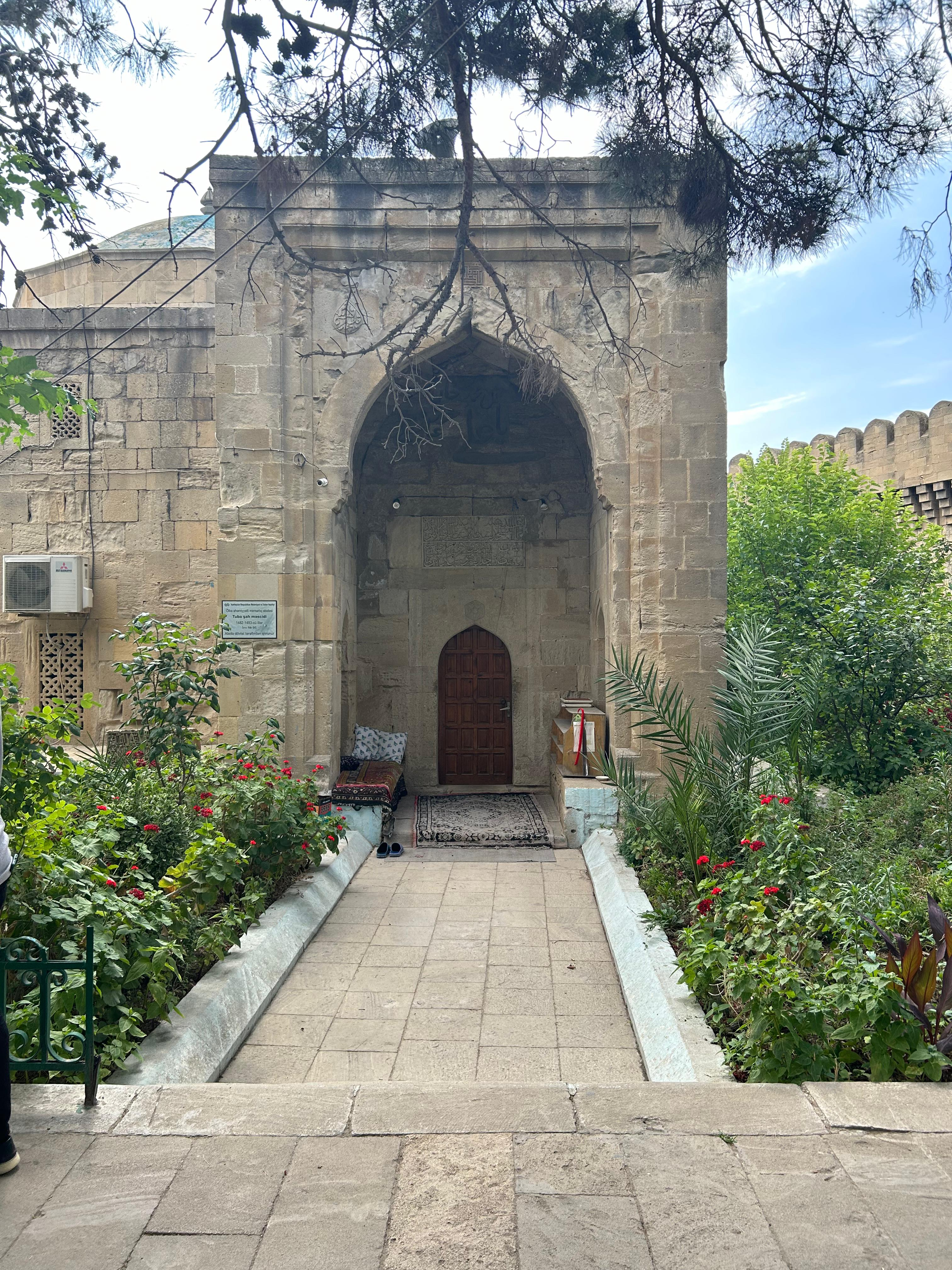
- Entrance to the former mosque in 2024

- Location of the former mosque in Azerbaijan

Religion
- Affiliation: Islam (former)
- Ecclesiastical or organizational status: Mosque (former)
- Status: Abandoned

Location
- Location: Mərdəkan, Baku
- Country: Azerbaijan
- Interactive map of Tuba Shahi Mosque
- Coordinates: 40°29′31″N 50°08′27″E

Architecture
- Type: Mosque architecture
- Style: Islamic; Shirvan-Absheron
- Funded by: Tuba Shahi
- Completed: 886 AH (1481/1482 CE)

Specifications
- Dome: One
- Inscriptions: Two (maybe more)
- Materials: Stone

The Tuba-Shahi Mosque (Azerbaijani: Tuba-Şahi məscidi; Persian: مسجد طوبا شاه) is a former mosque and historical architectural monument, located in the Mardakan village of the Khazar district in Baku, Azerbaijan. Completed in c. 1482, the former mosque is included in the list of the historical and architectural monuments of local importance approved by the Cabinet of Ministers of the Republic of Azerbaijan.

The former mosque was built not far from the Quadrangular Mardakan Castle dating from the Shirvanshahs era. The mosque has a clearly defined volume in the form of a parallelepiped completed with a dome. The central part of the prayer hall is covered with a dome resting on sails. On four sides, the central prayer hall is adjoined by lateral rectangular rooms.

== History ==
The mosque is named after Tuba Shahi, a woman who commissioned the construction of the edifice. The inscription on the mosque indicates that it was built in 886 AH (1481/1482 CE). Another inscription is located at the entrance to a narrow spiral staircase leading to the roof. This inscription belonged to an older mosque in the village, and indicated the time of that mosque's construction – Muharram 774 AH (1372/1373 CE) – and carries the name of the funder, Sadr Haji Baha-ad-Din, son of Khoja Nur-ad-Din, son of Mahmud Abayil.

Describing the sights of Absheron, I. Berezin wrote:

“The most wonderful of the nearby villages and perhaps the most wonderful on the entire Absheron Peninsula is Merdkhan, Merdakan, Merdakhane or, finally, Mardakent. Its population is not significant, but there is a rather elegant mosque built in 886 AH (1481/1482 CE) by Khalil Ulloy, and another fortification built by Mirza Muhammad Khan, probably the ruler of Baku, in 1133 AH (1720/1721 CE), as indicated by the Arabic inscriptions on the mosque and the fortification.”

M. A. Shikhaliyev and A. U. Yuzbashov note that at one time the mosque and the castle were the main buildings of the village where streets with one-story houses ran around them. The characteristic dome of the mosque stand out above the panorama of the village surrounded by two-story houses except for the main façade.

== Architecture ==
The mosque has a clearly defined volume in the form of a parallelepiped being completed with a dome. On its plan, the mosque is approaching the shape of a square with the sides of 11.3 m × 12.9 m (37 ft × 42 ft).

The central part of the prayer hall is covered with a dome resting on sails. The base of the dome hangs into the interior of the room as a 5 cm (2.0 in) shelf. The dome is supported by four massive stone pillars more than 1 m (3 ft 3 in) wide, which separate the prayer hall of the mosque from the other corner rooms. On four sides, the central square is adjoined by lateral rectangular rooms covered with stone vaults. In the corners, there are four small rectangular rooms connected to the prayer hall through lancet openings. The overlap of the first corner section adjacent to the entrance is made in the form of an ogival arch. The second section is covered similarly. The roof structure of the third section is made in the form of a dome on an octagonal base. And, finally, the ceiling of the fourth section has a star shape, formed by overlapping the overlying rows of the masonry.

The portal of the mosque, located to the east, is solved in the form of a large ledge with a deep portal niche. The latter also has a star-shaped overlap of a rather complex pattern. Through the entrance portal, the visitor enters the corner section, and from here into the central premises of the mosque. The mosque itself was built from the local limestone with lime mortar. All four façades are lined with teska stone. The walls of the mosque are on average up to 1.9 m (6 ft 3 in) thick.

Just like the façades, the surface of the walls inside is lined with pure stone. The outer generating the central dome has a lancet shape of a gentle outline. The twelve-sided drum on which the central dome rests is crowned with a small cornice. The described planned solution of the mosque, which is widespread in the mosques on Absheron, acquires a traditional approach and is often used for other types of structures, such as the turbe of the Shirvanshahs' Palace Complex of the 15th century, the "Khan's Country House" (14th century) in Nardaran, and other monuments with the only difference being marked by the entrance - designed in the form of a portal, either placed on the main axis of the building, or knocked down to one of the end sides.

Among the monument's details are the window stone bars, which are a rather complex geometric ornament. Of all the openings, only two have the same lattice pattern. This kind of stone grating is characteristic to the Shirvan-Absheron architectural school and is often found in the monuments of Absheron both in the earlier periods and in the 15th century, such as the Mausoleum of Seyid Yahya Bakuvi, Shah Mosque, Gileyli Mosque in Baku, Diri Baba Mausoleum, Shamakhi Juma Mosque, and others.

== See also ==
- Islam in Azerbaijan
- List of mosques in Azerbaijan
- List of mosques in Baku
