= Chimnaz Aslanova =

Soviet politician, activist (1904–2015)

Chimnaz Abdulali gizi Aslanova
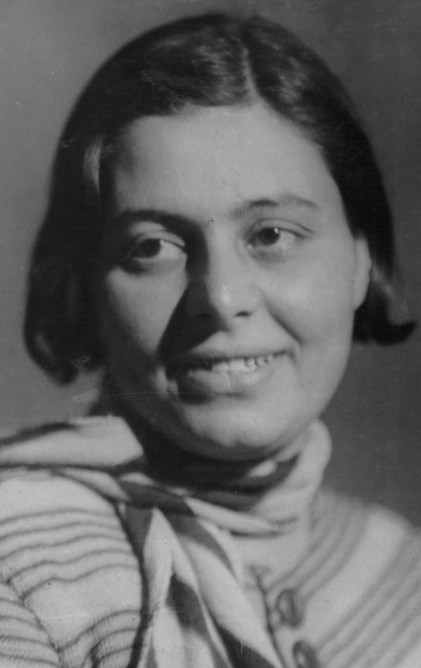
- Aslanova in 1938
- Born: 1904; Mardakan, Baku Governorate, Russian Empire
- Died: 10 March 1970 (aged 65–66); Baku, Azerbaijan SSR, Soviet Union
- Citizenship: Russian Empire; Azerbaijan Democratic Republic; Soviet Union
- Occupations: Educator, statesman and politician
- Awards: Order of Lenin Order of the Red Banner of Labour

Chimnaz Aslanova (Azerbaijani:Çimnaz Əbdüləli qızı Aslanova; 1904 – 10 March 1970) was an Azerbaijani educator, stateswoman and politician.

== Life ==
Aslanova was born in the village of Mardakan in Baku. She participated in the struggle against illiteracy in Soviet Azerbaijan at the age of 16 and graduated from the Azerbaijan Pedagogical Institute.

Aslanova worked as the head of the education department in Baku (1938–1939), later becoming the chairperson of the Central Committee of the Union of Primary and Secondary Schools of the Azerbaijan SSR (1939–1943) and the head of the education department of the Azerbaijan Communist Party (1943–1948). In addition to these roles, she also served as the deputy minister of education in the Azerbaijan SSR (1951–1952) and held positions as the director of the women's department of the Azerbaijan Soviet Communist Party Central Committee (1952–1956).

Aslanova was a member of the Supreme Soviet of the USSR in 1937–1958, and the Supreme Soviet of Azerbaijan in 1959–1962.

== Awards ==
Aslanova was awarded the Order of Lenin and the Order of the Red Banner of Labour.
