= Round Mardakan Fortress =

Historical and architectural monument in the Khazar district in Baku

Round Tower
- Azerbaijani: Dairəvi Mərdəkan qalası Persian: قلعه گرد مردکان
- Location within Azerbaijan

General information
- Status: Used as museum
- Architectural style: Architectural school of Shirvan-Absheron
- Location: Mardakan, Baku, Azerbaijan
- Coordinates: 40.495713°N 50.147079°E
- Completed: 1232
- Client: Fariburz III

Height
- Height: 16 m (52 ft)

Technical details
- Material: Limestone

Design and construction
- Architect: Abd al-Majid Masood oghlu

The Round Mardakan Fortress or the Small Mardakan Castle (Azerbaijani: Dairəvi Mərdəkan qalası, or Kiçik Mərdəkan qəsri; Persian: قلعه گرد مردکان, or قلعه کوچک مردکان) is a historical and architectural monument located in the Mardakan settlement of the Khazar district in Baku. By the Decree of the Cabinet of Ministers of the Republic of Azerbaijan, it was included in the list of historical and cultural monuments of world importance. In 2001, together with other coastal defence facilities of the Caspian Sea, it was included in the UNESCO World Heritage Reserve List.

The inscription (kitabe) on the castle's donjon says that it was built in 1232 by the architect Iranian Abdulmajid ibn Masud at the order of the Iranian Shirvanshah Fariburz III.

During the construction of the castle, lime mortar and local limestone were used. The Round Mardakan castle on plan consists of a central tower surrounded by powerful walls of 7 meters high supported by blind towers on the sides. The diameter of the tower is 7.6 m, the thickness of the walls on the lower floor is 2 m. Inside, the tower is divided into three tiers covered with stone flat domes. In the thickness of the wall of the third floor there is a small sanitary niche with a drain brought out to the outside.

== History ==
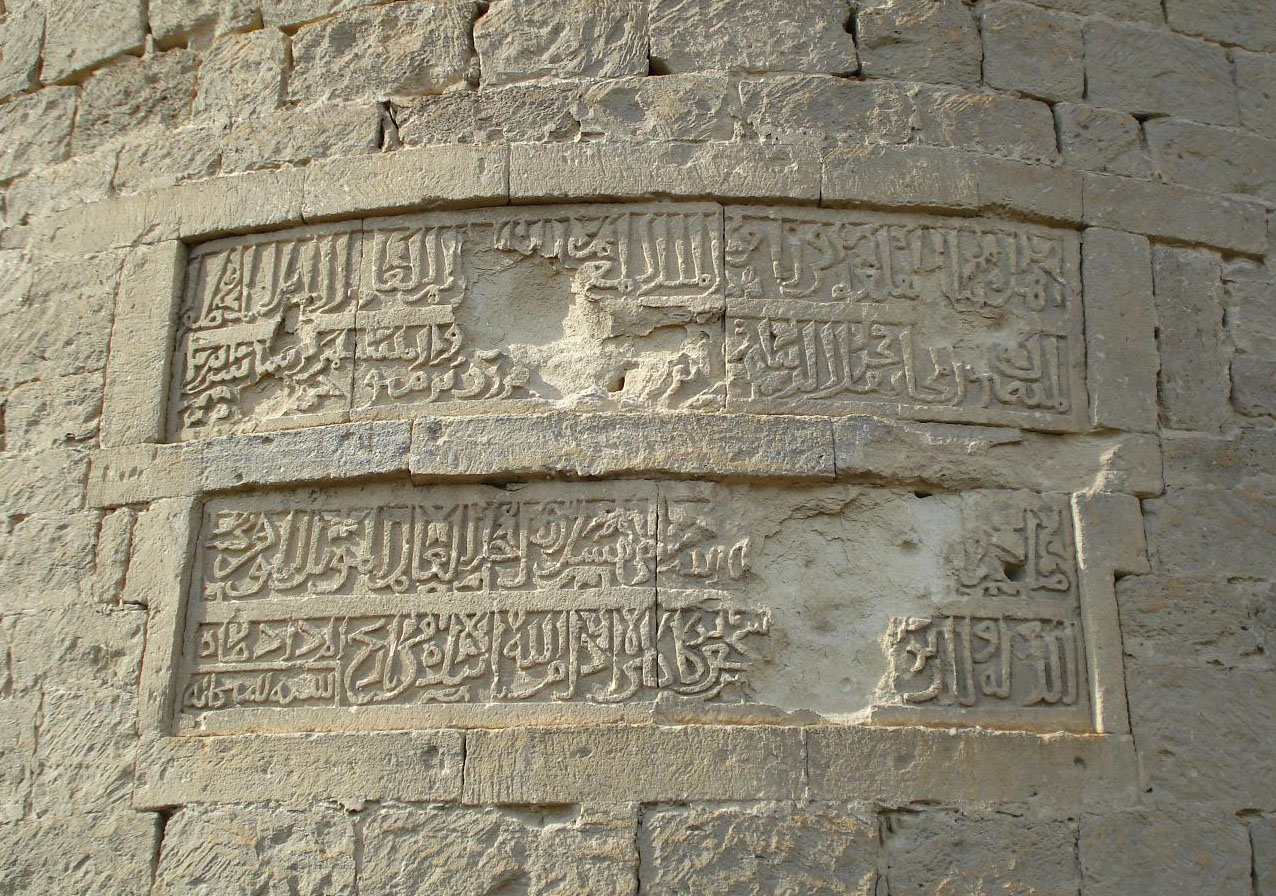
Inscription of the tower

The Round Mardakan Castle was part of the fortress complex once located on this territory and which has not survived to nowadays. The inscription (kitabe) on the castle's donjon says that it was built in 1232.

== Architectural features ==
The Round Mardakan Castle, which has an architectural plan typical for the cities of the Near and Central Asia of the 12th-15th centuries, consists of a central tower surrounded by powerful walls of 7 meters high supported by blind towers on the sides. The length of the fortress walls on all sides is 25 meters. There are loopholes at the corners of the fortress walls.

During the construction of the castle, lime mortar and local limestone were used. The central tower of the castle is well distinguished by its cylindrical volume, that once, apparently, ended in a powerful battlement parapet based on preserved stone brackets. The height of the tower to the brackets that supported the machicolations is about 15 m, the outer diameter is of 7.6 m, the thickness of the walls of the lower floor is of 2 m.

On the inside, the tower is divided into three tiers covered with flat stone domes. There are round holes in the centre of the domes.

The entrance to the tower is located at the ground level. This unfavourable circumstance for defence purposes is compensated by a very high entrance to the second floor at the height of more than three meters from the first floor. Thus, the attackers who broke into the first floor of the tower met with a new difficulty in accessing the second floor, while, at the same time, being fired upon through a hole in the dome.

There are no other openings in the walls of the first floor with the exception of the doorway and the opening to the second floor. In the second and the third floors there are loopholes that go out to the outer plane of the walls of the tower with narrow slots, with a strong expansion of their light slopes into the tower. The loopholes, apparently, served mainly for lighting, being essentially windows. In the wall's thickness of the third floor, there is a small sanitary niche with a drain brought out.

The upper platform of the tower was defensive and, thus, only the second and the third floors were residential. Their total area is about 32 square metres. The architect-researcher L. G. Mamikonov believes that this insignificant area indicates either a small family structure and limited funds of the owner of the tower, or that the tower did not serve as a place of a permanent residence, rather only a refuge during a siege. The limited number of loopholes and their design shows that the main defence of the tower was still concentrated on its upper platform.

The brackets are designed as figured consoles. The lowest ledge protrudes slightly from the surface of the walls; its frontal plane is decorated with a geometric carved ornament. Above, there is a buoy supporting the crowning part of the cornice which carried the currently destroyed parapet.

The Mardakan Castle's brackets are located frequently, which suggests a significant load and, consequently, a high parapet, probably crowned with battlements, hiding behind which, the defenders could fire at the enemy on the outskirts of the tower. Maschikuli were used to defeat the attackers directly at the walls' base. In the gaps between the brackets, the defenders of the castle threw stones, doused the besiegers with boiling tar, etc.

== See also ==
- Quadrangular castle (Mardakan)
- Mardakan
- Architecture of Azerbaijan
