= Mardakan Arboretum =

Arboretum in Baku, Azerbaijan

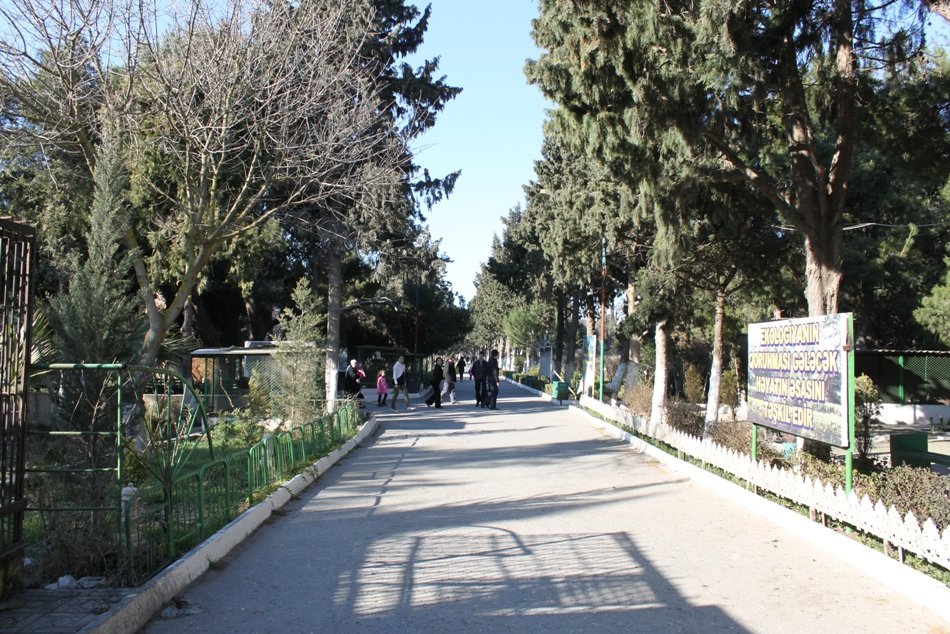
- Interactive map of Mardakan Arboretum
- Location: Mardakan, Baku, Azerbaijan
- Area: 12 hectares (30 acres)
- Created: 1926
- Founder: N. I. Vavilov
- Designer: N. I. Vavilov

The Mardakan arboretum is located in the Mardakan township on the semi-arid Absheron peninsula, 40 km (25 mi) away from Baku. It was a personal garden of Murtuza Mukhtarov, a tycoon and oil millionaire of his time around 1895–1920s. Currently, an area of the Arboretum is 24 hectares. The Arboretum is listed among the world's richest collections for the number and age of flora species. About 1,800 species including 1,540 plant types and breeds both from Azerbaijan and many other countries are being introduced to visitors.

== History ==
- 1920: The garden of M.Mukhtarov transformed into state property.
- 1924-1926: The Eastern Transcaucasia branch of the All-Union Institute of Applied Botany was organized on the basis of former suburban state farm.
- 1926: Arboretum was established by well-known botanist and academician Nikolai Vavilov.
- 1930: After the reorganization of the All-Union Institute of applied botany and new cultures, the branch was entered into the system of All-Union Institute of Horticulture as its department.
- 1936: Appointed experimental station for dry subtropics.
- Between 1945 and 1964: Included a research and development base for gardening, viticulture.
- Between 1945 and 1963: New species were introduced. This helped to ground the development of subtropical plant cultivation, selection and improvement of the sorts of pomegranate, olive, fig, Asian persimmon, and also to divide the park into districts scientifically.
- Between 1964 and 1966: The park was managed by the Ministry of Health of the Azerbaijan SSR.
- 1966: It was donated by the state to the botany institute of the National Academy of Sciences of the Azerbaijan SSR.
- 1996: Mardakan Dendrary was subordinated to Department of Biological Sciences of ANAS.
- 2014: Mardakan Arboretum was renamed Institute of Dendrology of Azerbaijan National Academy of Sciences according to the order of the Cabinet of Ministers of Azerbaijan.

== Activity of the arboretum ==
Mardakan arboretum is 4.5 km (2.8 mi) from the shore of the Caspian Sea. The territory of the arboretum is 12 hectares. 80–85% of the arboretum is covered with limestone. The soil cover is represented by various soil combinations. With increasing distance from the sea heavier and lighter sandy-loam grounds are encountered, which consists of insignificant depth of 0.5 to 1.5 meter. Only natural lignose and shrubs are almost absent. Cascara buckthorn, Georgian honeysuckle, tamarix, feral fig and other plants are encountered between the rocks. Arboretum's vegetation exists on the ground, imported from Lankaran and with artificial watering.

The water is taken from deep wells, filtered through the limestone, 30–80 m depth. Water from the wells is pulled into pools, from which it is diverted through the territory of the park through pipes. The diameter of the wells is 8–13 m and the average depth is 36 m. The deepest well located near the Yesenin house-museum was built in 1835 and has a total length of 27 meters. The well is surrounded by a round stonewalls in the form of castle and has a circular staircase about 18 meters high. the well has underground passages.

The pools were built between 1903 and 1905. Six artificial waterfalls have been installed in the garden along with the water-pools. The quadrangle pool has a 35 meters width, 50 meters length and 30 meters depth. The other pool was constructed on the ground in 1840 and in order to climb it, staircases are used.

According to Tofig Mammadov, the director of Mardakan arboretum, the overall quantity of species of flora and fauna in arboretum is about 1'700.

== Plants ==
=== Natural plants exposition ===
On the right and left side of the central alley of the garden, expositions of natural plants are exhibited. The expositions are categorized into eight botanical-geographical groups: East Asian flora, Central Asian flora, North American flora, South America flora, flora of Mediterranean countries, Australia and New Zealand flora, Caucasian flora and African flora.

=== Flower and decorative plants exposition ===
There are 22 types and 300 species of rose, 9 types and 35 species of daffodil, 6 types and 12 species of iris, 28 types and 56 species of cactus, 15 types and 26 species of poppy in this exposition.

=== Cultivated plants exposition ===
This exposition of 600 types and 760 species of cultivated plants is divided into 12 groups. It includes pomegranate and other fruit trees, berries, Medicinal plants and others.

== Museums ==
There are two museums located in the area of Mardakan Arboretum: "Botany museum" dedicated to the Soviet botanist Nikolai Vavilov and "Sergei Yesenin museum" dedicated to the Russian poet Sergei Yesenin.

=== Yesenin museum ===
This is the house-museum of Russian poet Sergei Yesenin who lived here in 1924–1925. The museum was established in 1974 on the initiative of Heydar Aliyev and inaugurated on April 1, 1975, on the occasion of Yesenin's 80th anniversary. The street where this museum located has been named after Sergei Yesenin. The museum has been operating under the Literature Museum of Azerbaijan since 1999. After the reestablishment of the structure of the Literature Museum in 2008, the house-museum of S. Yesenin transformed into the Center of Russian-Azerbaijani literary relationships named after S.A.Yesenin. The Center provides information about the poet's life and his poems, as well as collects and research the materials related to Russian-Azerbaijani literary relationship.

== Filming ==
Some scenes of the Azerbaijani films, such as "The Cloth Peddler", "Qorxma, mən səninləyəm" (1981), "Bаşsız аtlı", "Lənkəran xanının vəziri" were shot in this garden.

== Photos ==
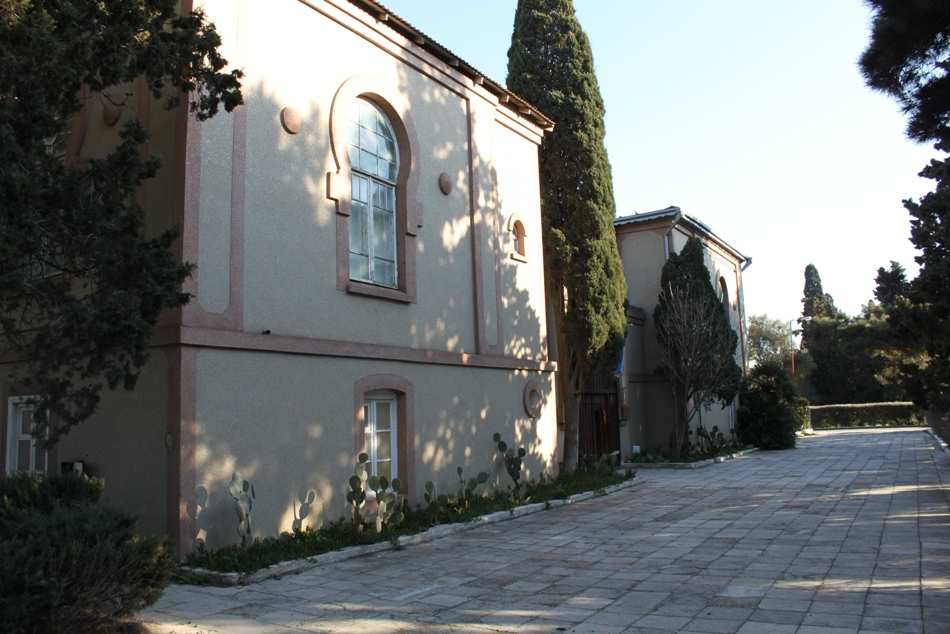

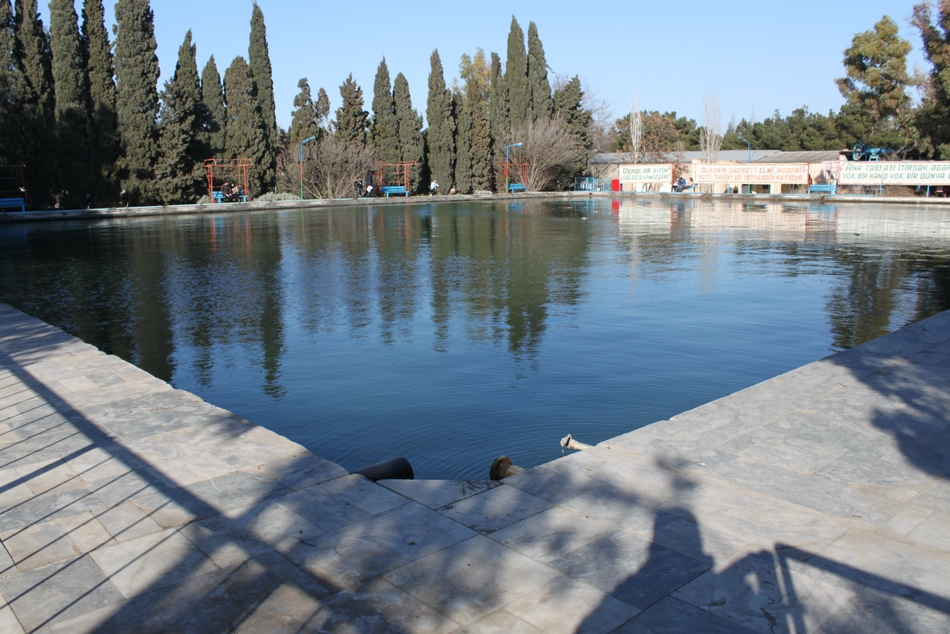

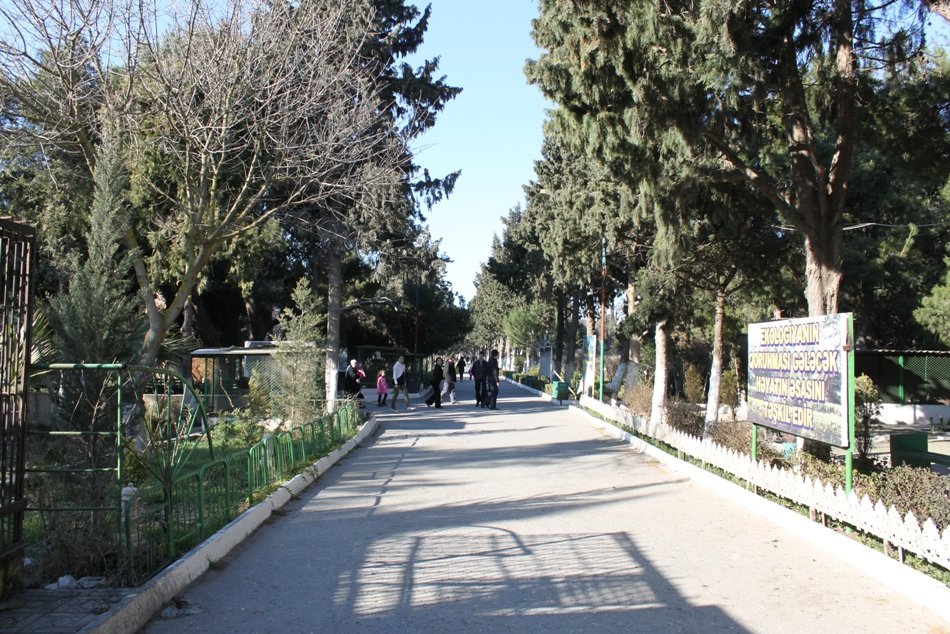
