= Quadrangular Mardakan Fortress =

Historical and architectural monument in the Khazar district in Baku

Quadrangular castle
- Azerbaijani: Dördkünc Mərdəkan qalası Persian: قلعه چهارضلعی مردکان

General information
- Status: Used as museum
- Architectural style: Architectural school of Shirvan-Absheron
- Location: Mardakan, Baku, Azerbaijan
- Coordinates: 40.492131°N 50.140677°E
- Completed: 14th century
- Client: Akhsitan I

Height
- Height: 22 m

Technical details
- Material: Limestone

The Quadrangular Mardakan Fortress or the Great Mardakan Castle (Azerbaijani: Dördkünc Mərdəkan qalası or Azerbaijani: Böyük Mərdəkan qəsri; Persian: قلعه چهارضلعی مردکان or قلعه بزرگ مردکان) is a historical and architectural monument located in the Mardakan settlement of the Khazar raion in Baku, Azerbaijan. It is included in the Azerbaijani Ministry of Culture's list of monuments of world importance. In 2001, along with other objects of the coastal defence of the Caspian Sea, it was included in the UNESCO World Heritage Reserve List.

The fortress was built in the shape of a quadrangle in the 12th century by Shirvanshah Akhsitan I. The courtyard has dimensions of 24 meters by 20 meters, and the tower located in the courtyard is 22 meters tall. The outer walls of the fortress are reinforced with semi-circular blind towers located at the corners and along the wall. In general, the donjon of the fortress has more developed architectural features compared to the Round Mardakan Fortress.

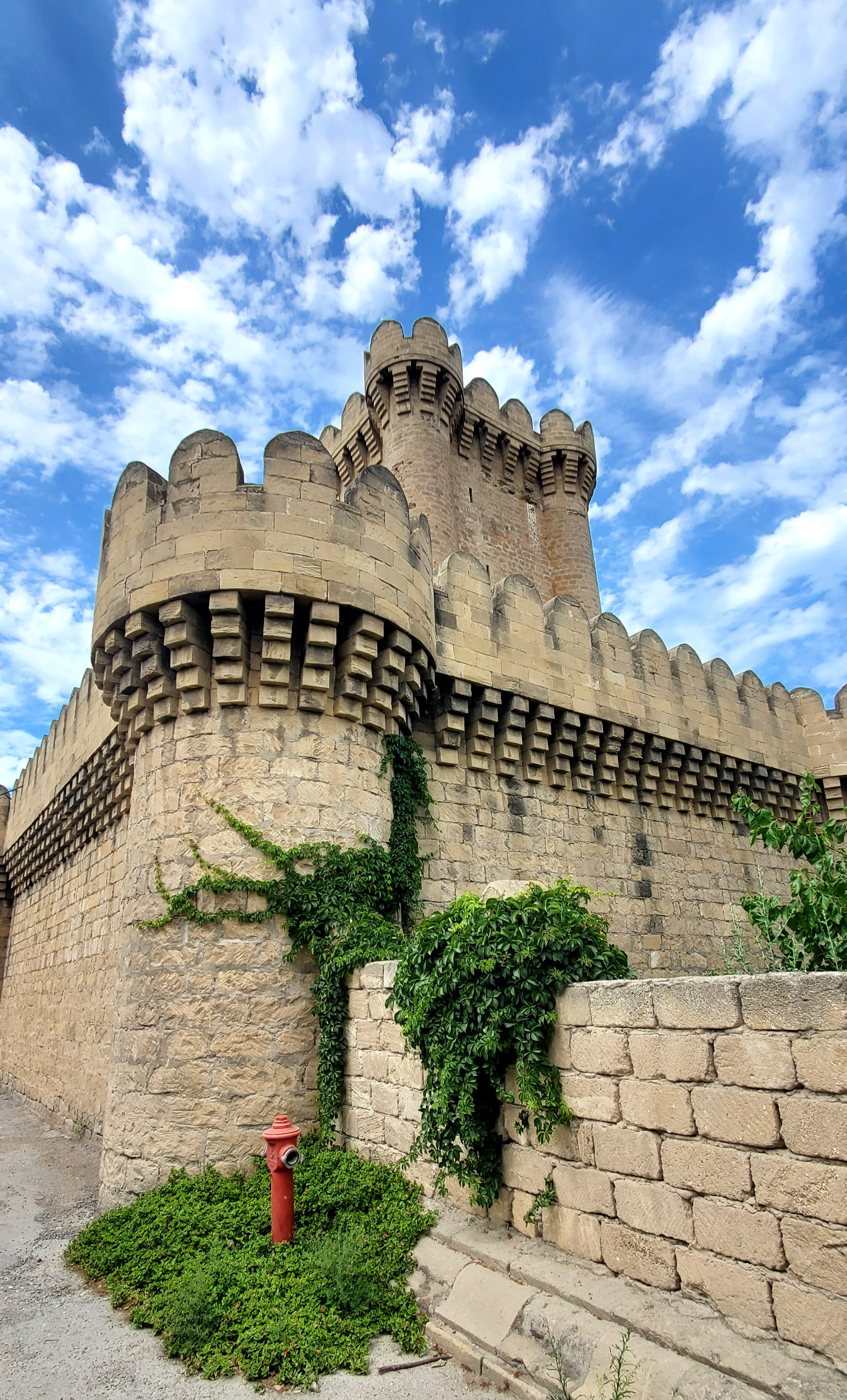
Quadrangular Mardakan Fortress in 2024

== History ==
The Quadrangular Mardakan Fortress was built in 1187–88 at the order of Shirvanshah Akhsitan I, son of Shirvanshah Manuchihr III of Shirvan, in honour of a military victory by Akhsitan. At various times, the fortress was used as a defensive structure, as an observation post, and as a castle.

== Architectural features ==
The courtyard has dimensions of 24 meters by 20 meters, and the tower located in the courtyard is 22 meters tall. According to L. G. Mamikonov, the height of the tower makes it possible to fire from it on both the territory outside the outer walls of the fortress and the castle's courtyard. The outer walls of the fortress are reinforced with semi-circular blind towers located at the corners and along the wall. The distance between the towers does not exceed 10–11 meters, which differs from the generally accepted distance in the construction of defensive structures until the 14th century. The architect is believed to have decided to reduce the distance between the towers intending to protect the areas adjacent to the outer walls of the fortress with crossfire.

The entrance gate, located in the middle of one of the fortress walls, is protected on the both sides by well-fortified semi-circular towers. The courtyard is planned in such a way that an enemy, breaking through the first line of defence and entering the courtyard, would run into a 5 meter wide corridor between the donjon and the castle wall, which would make them an easy target for defenders located on the platform at the top of the tower.

Generally, the fortress' donjon has more developed architectural features compared to the Round Mardakan Fortress. In contrast to the three-tiered form characteristic to round donjons, the inner space of the square donjon of the Great Mardakan Fortress is divided into five tiers. Among the donjon's tiers, only the first and last have a stone roof, designed in the form of a vaulted ceiling. The ceilings of the remaining tiers are flat, made on wooden beams.

The extension to the four sides of the donjon's semi-circular towers influenced its architectural features and made it more durable, which made it possible to increase the height of the building. It also created conditions for a more effective organization of the tower walls' defence.

== See also ==
- Architecture of Azerbaijan
