= People's Writer of Azerbaijan =

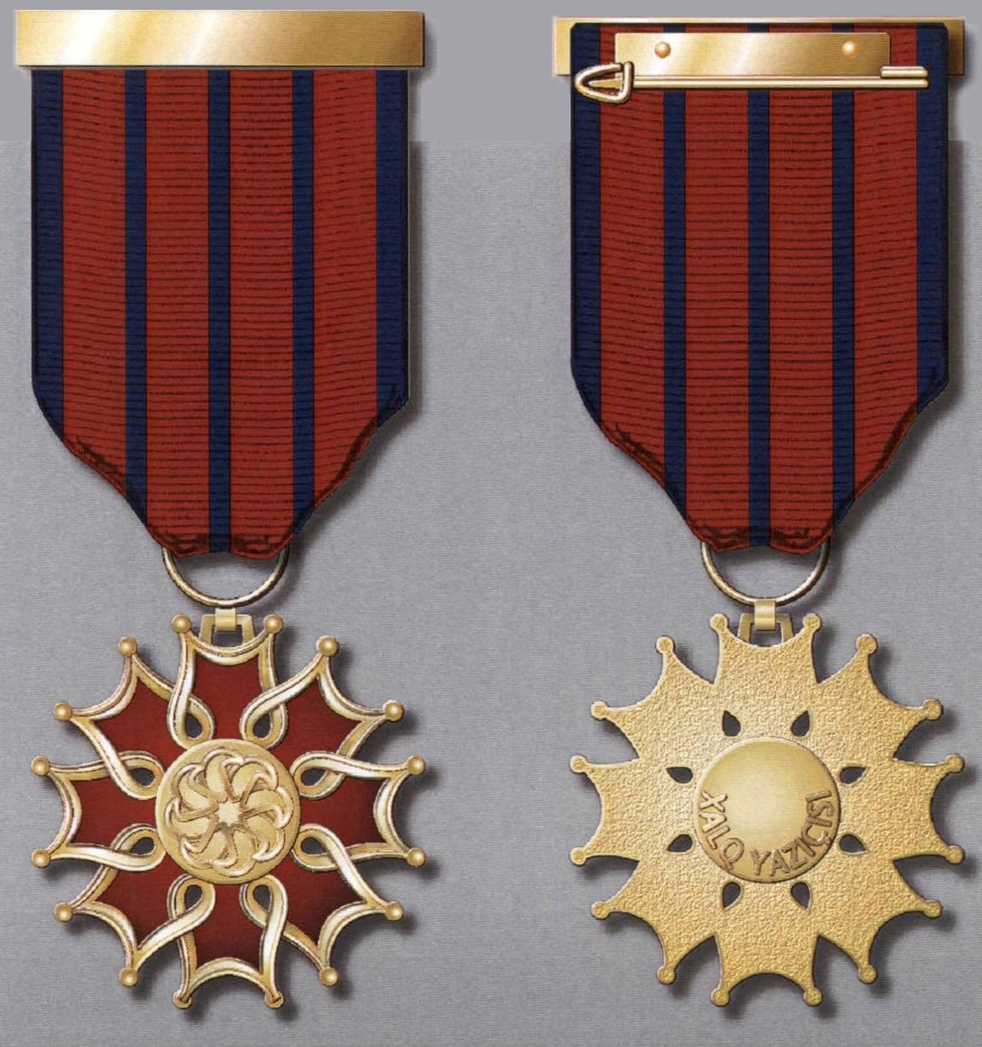
"People's Writer" badge

People's Writer of Azerbaijan (Azerbaijani: Xalq yazıçısı) is the honorary title granted to the distinguished writers of Azerbaijan for their contribution to the development of Azerbaijani literature.

== Assignment ==
The honorary title "People's Writer of Azerbaijan" was established by Decree of the President of the Republic of Azerbaijan dated May 22, 1998, along with some other titles.

The President of Azerbaijan confers the honorary title on his initiative, as well as on the proposal of the National Assembly and the Cabinet of Ministers.

The title is awarded only to citizens of Azerbaijan. According to the decree, the honorary title of "People's Writer of Azerbaijan" cannot be awarded to the same person repeatedly.

A person awarded an honorary title may be deprived of the title in case of misconduct.

Persons awarded the honorary title "People's Writer of Azerbaijan" also receive a certificate and a badge of the honorary title of the Republic of Azerbaijan. The badge of honor is worn on the right side of the chest.

== People's Writers of Azerbaijan ==
- Anar Rzayev
- Huseyn Ibragimov
- Yusif Samadoghlu
- Magsud Ibrahimbeyov
- Rustam Ibragimbeyov
- Huseyn Abaszadeh
- Elchin Efendiyev
- Gulhuseyn Huseynoglu
- Isa Huseynov
- Elmira Akhundova
- Chingiz Abdullayev
- Ilyas Afandiyev
- Mirza Ibrahimov
- Aziza Jafarzadeh
- Suleyman Rahimov

== See also ==
- Orders, decorations, and medals of Azerbaijan
- People's Writer
