= Khazar raion =

Khazar Xəzər
- Raion
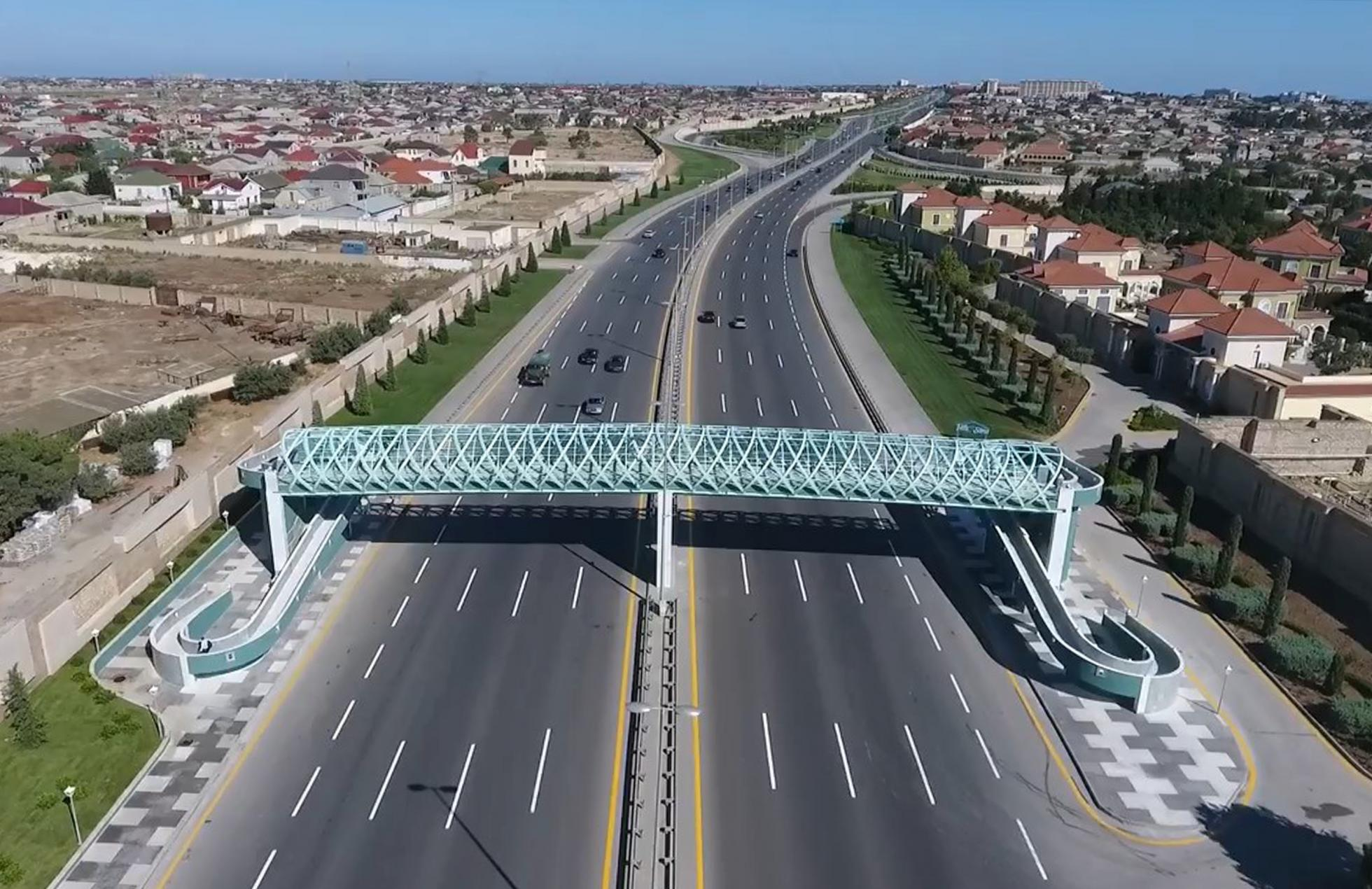
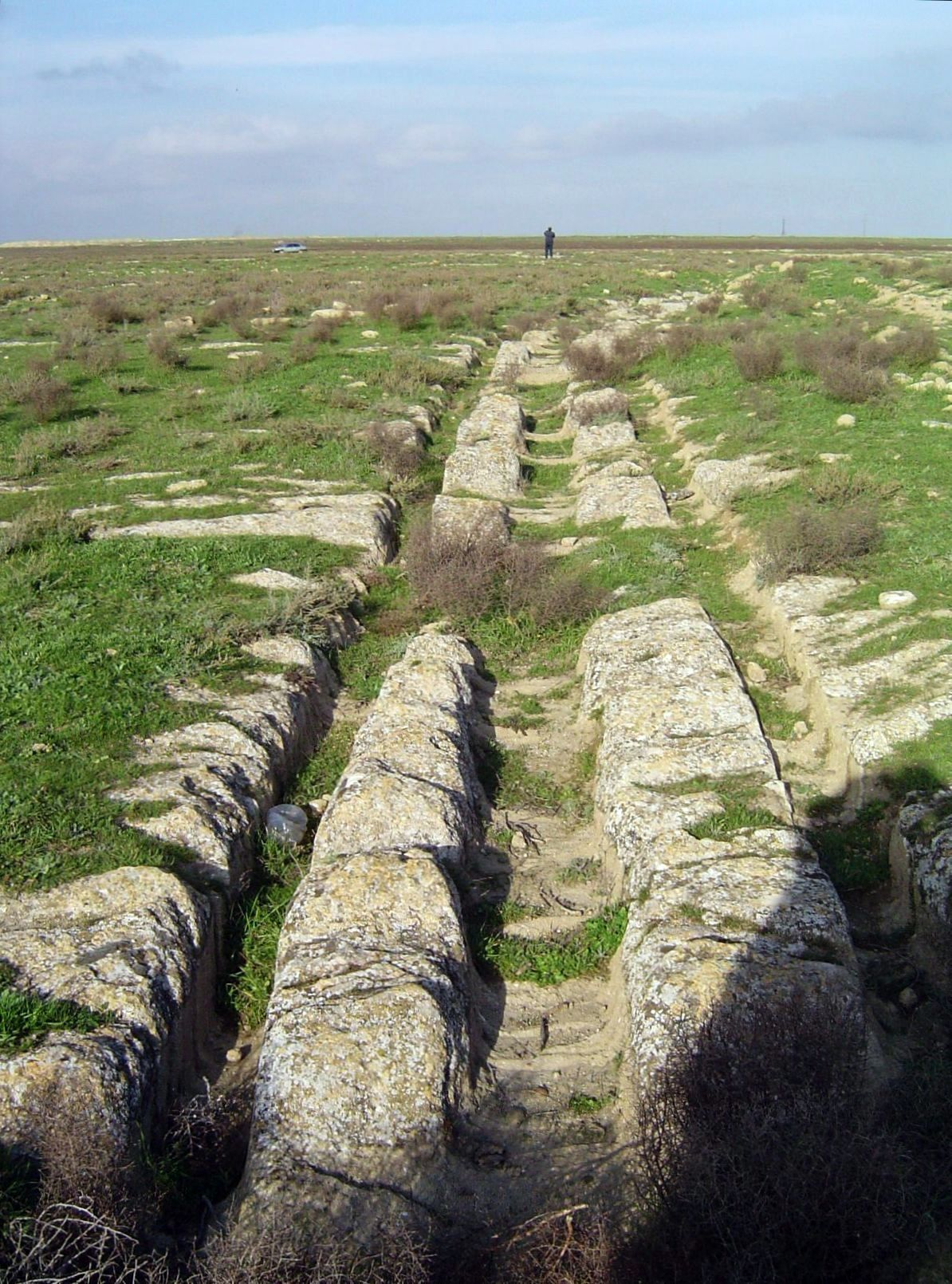
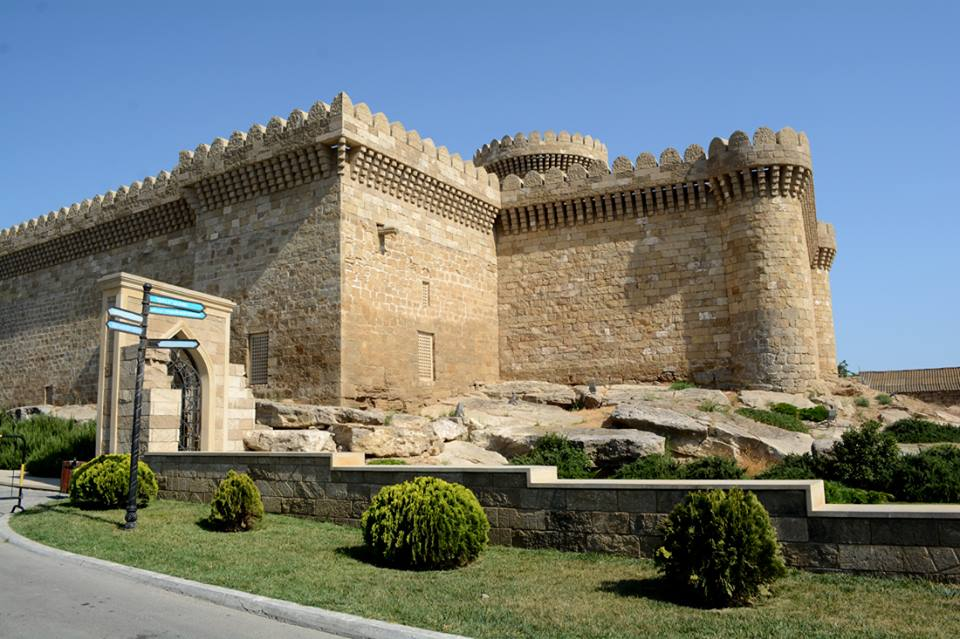
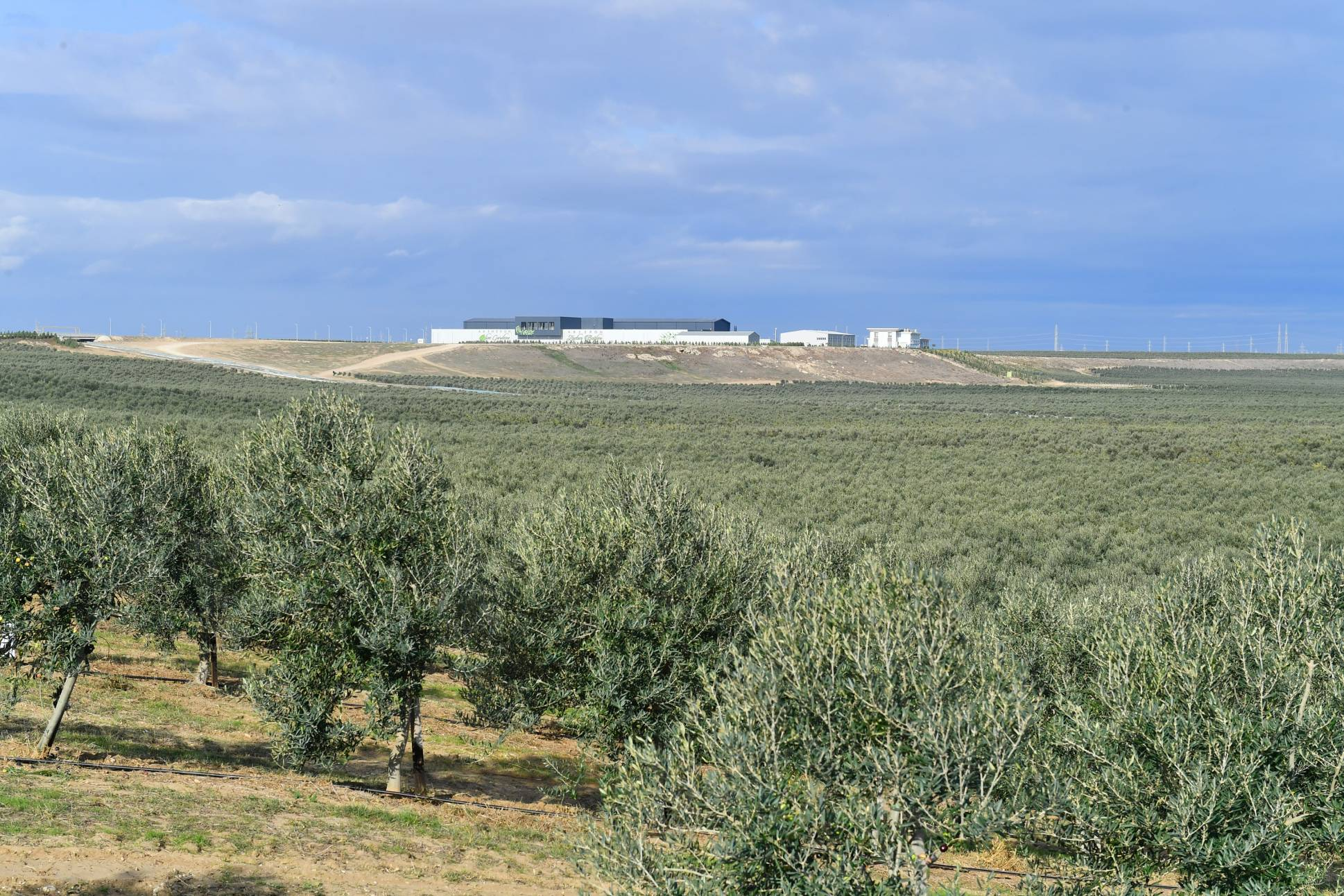
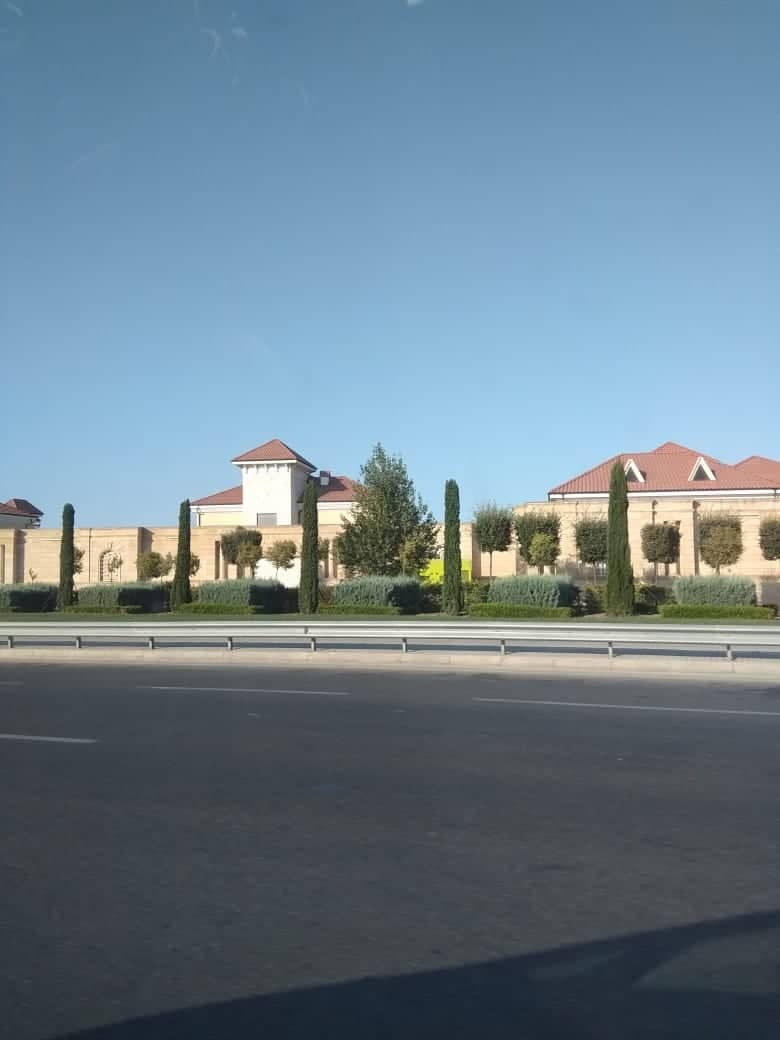
- Mardakan-Zughulba Highway Absheron's stone roads Qala Fortress Zira Olive Gardens Buzovna
- Interactive map of Khazar
- Location of Khazar Rayon in Azerbaijan Location of Khazar Rayon in Asia
- Coordinates: 40°27′23″N 50°06′56″E
- Country: Azerbaijan
- City: Baku
- Municipalities: 8

Government
  - Body: Khazar Rayon Executive Power
  - Mayor: Elshan Salahov (New Azerbaijan Party)
  - MNAs: List of MNAs: Gulshan Pashayeva (Independent); Gunay Afandiyeva (Independent)

Area
  - Total: 336.86 km^{2} (130.06 sq mi)

Population (2023)
  - Total: 204,736
  - Density: 607.78/km^{2} (1,574.1/sq mi)
- Time zone: UTC+4 (AZT)
- Area code: +994 12
- Website: www.xazar-ih.gov.az

The Khazar raion or Khazar rayon (Azerbaijani: Xəzər rayonu) is one of the 12 rayonlar in Baku, Azerbaijan. It has a population of 204,736. Khazar rayon is a part of the Baku Metropolitan Area which makes up a majority of the Absheron Peninsula, with a total population of 3,675,000 people. The district is home to the Heydar Aliyev International Airport, busiest airport in the Caucasus, and one of the busiest airports in post-Soviet countries and West Asia. It is connected to the majority of the settlements in the district by Baku Airport Highway, which also serves as the main road which connects eastern Absheron to the capital city of Baku.

== Name ==
Before being renamed by the decision of the Parliament of Azerbaijan on May 11, 2010, the rayon was called Azizbekov (Azerbaijani: Əzizbəyov) after Meshadi Azizbeyov, a Soviet-Azerbaijani revolutionary, leader of the revolutionary movement in Azerbaijan, and one of the first Azerbaijani Marxists. The name of the district comes from the Caspian Sea, which is when transliterated from the Azerbaijani language is spelled as "Khazar."

== Overview ==
Located in the northeastern part of the Absheron Peninsula, the Khazar region is recognized as the oil region, blending nine distinct climate zones within its atmosphere. Nestled in a tranquil corner of the peninsula, it shares borders with the Sabunchu, Surakhani, and Pirallahi rayons. Khazar contains the municipalities of Bina, Buzovna, Mardakan, Qala, Shagan, Shuvalan, Turkan, and Zira. Bina, which is adjacent to the Heydar Aliyev International Airport, is the most populated municipality. Dreamland Gold Club is also positioned in the district, along with its houses that are located next to SABIS SUN International School, also in Khazar. Shuvalan Park, the biggest shopping center in eastern Absheron, is located in Shuvalan. Zira Ecopark is located in the settlement of Zira.

== History ==
The territory of the Khazar district, located in the northeast of the Absheron Peninsula, is considered one of the region's ancient areas. The settlements in the current Khazar district were initially part of the “Qala-Mashtag administrative district,” which existed from 1921 to 1936 and encompassed a larger area, including several other villages. Later, following a reorganization of administrative zoning, the settlements of what is now Khazar district were included in the S. Artyom (FS Sergeyev) district, established in 1936 and operating until 1966. In 1966, the “M. Azizbeyov district” administrative unit was formed.

On May 24, 2011, the district's name was changed again to “Khazar.” At that time, the total area of the district was 403.6 square kilometers, and it included 12 settlements: Mardakan, Buzovna, Shuvalan, Bina, Gala, Shagan, Zira, Turkan, Pirallahi, Gurgan, Chilov, and Neft Dashlari, with a population of 212,800 people. With the passage of the Law of the Republic of Azerbaijan No. 519-IVQ on December 21, 2012, titled "On the establishment of Pirallahi Rayon within the administrative territorial unit of Baku city," Pirallahi became a separate district starting on January 17, 2013. This new district, which was formed from the settlements of Pirallahi, Gurgan, Chilov, and Neft Dashlari, became the 12th district of Baku.

Today, Khazar district covers an area of 336.86 square kilometers and has a population of over 200,000 residents, consisting mainly of Azerbaijanis. The district is home to various institutions, including the Khazar District Executive Power, the National Aviation Academy, the Police Academy, the Dendrology Institute (Mardakan Arboretum) and its park, 29 secondary schools, 1 secondary vocational school, 3 gymnasiums, 6 boarding schools, 23 kindergartens, 3 private kindergartens, 10 cultural centers, 7 libraries, 19 parks, 8 settlement representative offices, 8 settlement municipalities, 39 active industrial enterprises, as well as the Khazar District Telephone Exchange, Water and Canal Department, Central Post Office, District Veterinary Department, and 22 medical institutions. Additionally, the district supports 18,851 internally displaced persons, 149 families of martyrs, 182 disabled veterans from the Karabakh War, 5 families of martyrs from January 20, 1990, 14 disabled veterans from January 20, 1990, 27 disabled individuals from the Chernobyl disaster, and 8 disabled veterans of the Great Patriotic War. The district also includes 642 Karabakh War veterans and 1 National Hero.

== See also ==
- Khazars
