= List of lighthouses in Azerbaijan =

This is a list of lighthouses in Azerbaijan.

== Lighthouses ==
Name	Image	Year built	Location & coordinates	Class of Light	Focal height (metres)	ARLHS number
Absheron lighthouse		1860	Gürgan	Oc W 6s	101	AZE006
Amburan lighthouse		1882	Nardaran	Oc(2) W 15s	72	AZE008
Astara lighthouse			Astara		25	AZE002
Baku lighthouse			Baku	F W	60	
Boyuk Zira Lighthouse		1958	Absheron District	Fl W (3) 9s	42	AZE009
Çilov lighthouse		1881	Çilov	Fl(4) WR 30s	51	AZE004
Kür dili lighthouse			Neftchala District			AZE010
Lankaran Lighthouse		1869	Lankaran	L (2) Fl W 15s	33	AZE001
Oil Rocks lighthouse		1949	Neft Daşları		50	AZE005
Qaradağ lighthouse			Garadagh region		40	
Sangi Mugan lighthouse		1891	Svinoy		50	AZE003
Shuvalan Lighthouse		1907	Shuvalan	Iso W 6s	19	AZE007

== See also ==
- Lists of lighthouses and lightvessels
