= Absheron Lighthouse =

Lighthouse in Azerbaijan

Absheron lighthouse Abşeron mayakı
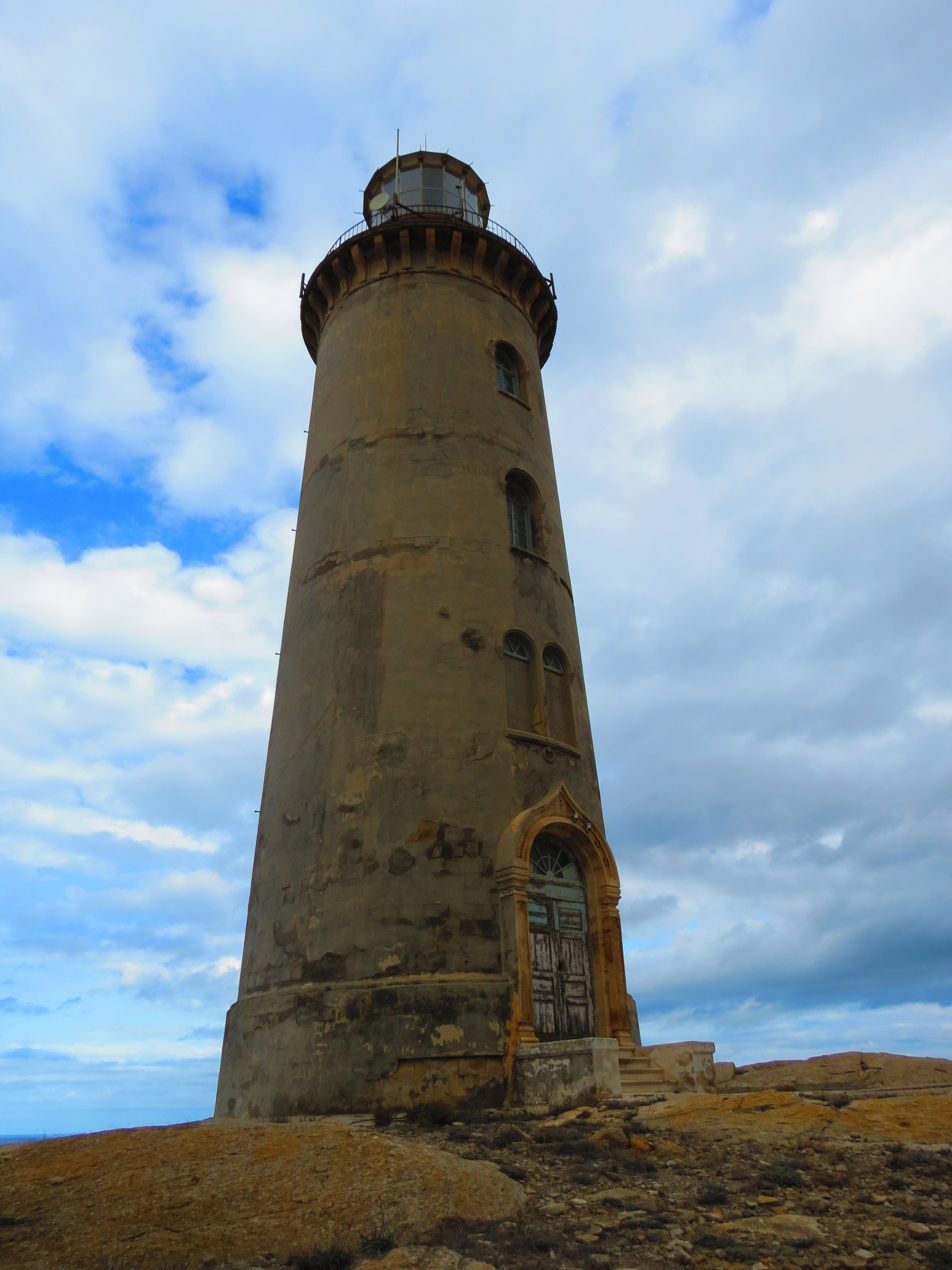
- Absheron Lighthouse pictured on the stamp
- Location: Absheron peninsula, Gürgan, Gürgən-Pirallahı, Baku, Azerbaijan
- Coordinates: 40°24′25″N 50°19′30″E

Tower
- Constructed: 1860
- Height: 25 m (82 ft)
- Shape: cylinder
- Markings: White (tower), red (lantern)

Light
- Focal height: 101 m (331 ft)
- Characteristic: Oc W 6s

Absheron Lighthouse or Gurgan Lighthouse (Azerbaijani: Abşeron mayakı) is located on the Absheron Peninsula, on the Absheron Mountain. Built in 1860, it is the largest of the peninsula's lighthouses.

== History ==
On 14 September 1857, the large steamship "Guba", engaged in astronomical and hydrographic research, was wrecked near the Shuvalan Cape. Consequently, 22 crew members lost their lives, 57 people were rescued. After this tragedy, in order to ensure the ships' safety, the construction of lighthouses on Absheron began.

In 1859, on the top of the Pirallahi Island, the Absheron Lighthouse was raised - the largest of the peninsula's lighthouses. It stands on a high rocky ledge, the height of the stone tower is 25 meters. The lighthouse has an original design with an arched entrance in the form of a carved portal and windows in the shape of anchors. 102 steps of a spiral staircase lead to the upper part of the stone tower. On 23 October 1860, the lighthouse became operational. It has a visibility range of 38 km, it makes it possible at night to navigate the Absheron Strait on the ship's fairway between the mainland and the island of Pirallahi. In 1874, the Baku society for "rescuing the people perishing in the sea" built, on the Shuvalan Cape, a rescue station at the entrance to the Absheron Strait from the north. The lighthouse was initially lit by a kerosene lamp. Later, in 1912, its lighting was renewed with a kerosene-heating installation, and since 1956 with electricity. At this time, the light of the lighthouse is provided by a 500 W electric lamp and a system of special lenses. Near the lighthouse there are three medieval towers.

== See also ==
- Boyuk Zira Lighthouse
- Monument to the "Guba" ship sailors

== Literature ==
- Описание маяков, башен и знаков Российской Империи по берегам Каспийского моря : исправленное по 1 января 1905 года. — Издание Главного Гидрографического Управления Морского Министерства. — С.-Петербург : Тип. Мор. Мин-ва, 1905. — 35 с.
- Описание маяков, башен и знаков Российской империи по берегам Каспийского моря : (Исправленное по 1-е января 1908 года). — Saint Petersburg.
