= Shuvalan Lighthouse =

Lighthouse in Azerbaijan

Shuvalan lighthouse Şüvəlan mayakı
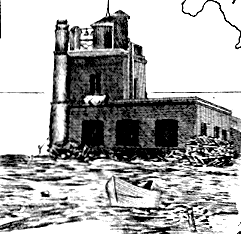
- Location: Shuvalan, Khazar raion, Azerbaijan
- Coordinates: 40°29′53″N 50°13′47″E

Tower
- Constructed: 1907
- Height: 12 m (39 ft)
- Heritage: cultural heritage monument in Azerbaijan

Light
- Focal height: 19 m (62 ft)
- Characteristic: Iso W 6s

Shuvalan lighthouse is located near Shuvalan on the Absheron Peninsula in the Republic of Azerbaijan. Built in 1907, it is located near the rescue station at Cape Shoulan.

== History ==
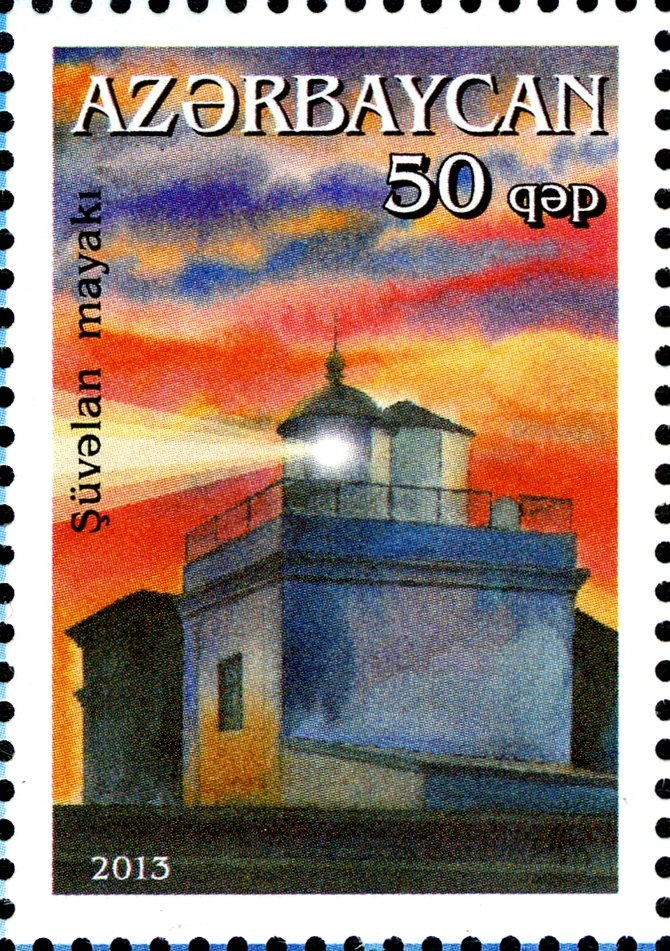
Azerbaijan's stamp (2013)

On 14 September 1857, the large steamship "Guba", engaged in astronomical and hydrographic research, was wrecked near the Shuvalan cape. Consequently, 22 crew members lost their lives, 57 people were rescued. After this tragedy, in order to ensure the safety of the ships, the construction of lighthouses on Absheron began

It is located in Shuvalan, near the Severnaya state district power plant. Its story begins in 1874, when the Baku Society of "rescuing the people perishing in the sea" built, on the Cape Shoulan, a rescue station at the entrance to the Absheron Strait from the north. In 1907, 33 years later, a wooden lamppost with an optical device with a visibility range of 15 km was installed on the roof of its building. It was decided to use the station as a lighthouse. This became especially proper after that the Maiden Tower ceased to function as a lighthouse in 1907.

The lighting device gave a beam at a distance of 15 km. In 1935, after renewing the lighting device, the visibility range of the fire increased to 24 km. Currently, the lighthouse is still in operation belonging to a closed department, and remaining a strategic facility.

It is a low, one-story cubic building with a skylight on the roof. The edifice of the Shuvalan lighthouse was built on a rock at a height of 233 meters. Nearby, there is a rescue station with White's 6 oared whaleboat and a rocket launcher. There is a bell weighing 62 pounds near the station.

== See also ==
- Absheron Lighthouse
- Boyuk Zira Lighthouse
- Monument to the "Guba" ship sailors
