= Amburan Lighthouse =

Lighthouse in Azerbaijan

Amburan Lighthouse Amburan mayakı
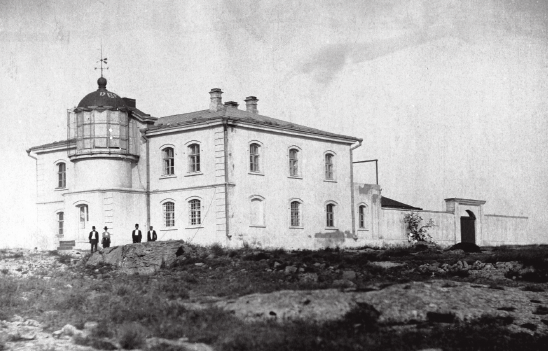
- Location: Nardaran, Sabunçu raion, Azerbaijan
- Coordinates: 40°34′59″N 49°59′05″E

Tower
- Constructed: 1882
- Construction: masonry (foundation), masonry (tower)
- Height: 12 m (39 ft)
- Shape: round tower without windows
- Markings: White (tower), red (roof)
- Power source: mains electricity

Light
- First lit: 1884
- Focal height: 72 m (236 ft)
- Characteristic: Oc(2) W 15s

Amburan Lighthouse or Nardaran Lighthouse (Azerbaijani: Amburan mayakı), was built on the Kohne Bilgah Cape on the Galagaya Upland in 1882. It is an operating lighthouse in the Caspian Sea (Azerbaijan).

== History ==
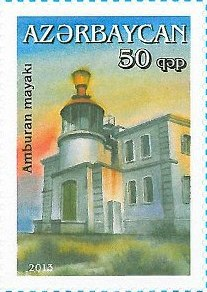
Azerbaijan's stamp (2013)

The Amburan lighthouse was built in 1882 on the Amburan spit on the Galagaya Upland. It was a two-storey stone edifice, originally built for residential purposes. On the side of the building facing the sea, an extension was added: a protruding porch-vestibule that rose to the second floor, topped by an almost round, windowless tower.

A lighting lantern was installed on the second floor of this tower in 1884. As in the case of the Shuvelan lighthouse, it is located in a round glazed room on all sides, evoking a small glazed rotunda. The Amburan lighthouse is unique for its light, which shines alternately white and red, with a distinct red glint. Previously, the light was sectorial, directed in a specific direction, but after the 1983 reconstruction, it became circular.

== See also ==
- Absheron Lighthouse
- Boyuk Zira Lighthouse
- Monument to the "Guba" ship sailors

== Literature ==
- Амбуранский маяк. Описание маяков, башен и знаков Российской Империи по берегам Каспийского моря : исправленное по 1 января 1905 года. — Издание Главного Гидрографического Управления Морского Министерства. — С.-Петербург : Тип. Мор. Мин-ва, 1905. — 35 с.
