= Artyom (disambiguation) =

Artyom, also spelled Artem, is a Slavic male given name.

It may also refer to:

- Artyom, Azerbaijan, a town in Azerbaijan
- Artyom, Russia, a town in Primorsky Krai, Russia
- Artyom (EP), a 2020 EP by Slava Marlow
- Artem Island, alternative name of Pirallahi Island in the Caspian Sea

== See also ==
- Artemis (disambiguation)
