= Gurgin =

Gurgin or Gurgîn may refer to:

- Gurgin Khan
- Gurgin Khan (Bengal)
- Gurgîn Bakircioglu

== See also ==
- Gurgen
- Gurgintius
