= Çilov-Neft Daşları =

Municipality in Baku, Azerbaijan

Coordinates: 40°19′46″N 50°36′11″E

Çilov-Neft Daşları (also, Cilov-Neft Daşları) is a municipality in the Pirallahy raion of Baku, Azerbaijan. It has a population of 1,797. The municipality consists of an island with the three villages of Çilov and Neft Daşları, and Jiloy.
