= Gurgen =

Gurgen or Gourgen (Armenian: Գուրգեն, Georgian: გურგენ) is an Armenian and Georgian masculine name of Middle Persian origin (Gurgēn), itself ultimately deriving from Old Iranian Vṛkaina-. It may refer to:

== Georgian monarchs ==
- Gurgen of Iberia (died 1008), King of Georgia
- Gurgen I of Tao (died 891), Georgian prince
- Gurgen II of Tao (died 941), Georgian prince
- Gurgen I of Klarjeti (died 923), Georgian prince

== Other people ==
=== Armenians ===
- Gurgen-Khachik of Vaspurakan (died 1003), fifth Armenian king of the Artsruni dynasty
- Gurgen I of Lori, Armenian King of Lori (r. 979–989)
- Gurgen Askaryan (1928–1997), Soviet-Armenian physicist
- Gurgen Baghdasaryan (born 1977), Armenian politician and parliamentarian
- Gurgen Boryan (1915–1971), Armenian poet and playwright
- Gurgen Dalibaltayan (1926–2015), Armenian military commander
- Gourgen Edilyan (1885–1942), Armenian psychologist
- Gurgen Egiazaryan (1948–2020), Armenian politician and bureaucrat
- Gurgen Engibaryan (born 1964), Lebanese footballer of Armenian descent
- Gurgen Hovhannisyan (born 1998), Armenian boxer
- Gurgen Mahari (1903–1969), Armenian writer and poet
- Gurgen Margaryan (1978–2004), Armenian soldier
- Gurgen Nersisyan (born 1985), Armenian politician
- Gourgen Paronyan (1905–1981), Armenian painter
- Gurgen Vardanjan (born 1963), Soviet Armenian figure skater and coach
- Gourgen Yanikian (1895–1984), Armenian genocide survivor and assassin

=== Turks ===
- Akif Gürgen (born 1977), Turkish volleyball player
- Cemil Gürgen Erlertürk (1918–1970), Turkish footballer and seaplane pilot
- Kerem Gürgen, Turkish boxer
- Mehmet Gürgen (born 1968), Turkish boxer
- Kurken Alemshah (1907–1947), Turkish Armenian composer and conductor
- Gürgen Öz (born 1978), Turkish actor

== Places ==
- Gürgan, Azerbaijan
- Gürgen, Dargeçit, village in Mardin Province, Turkey
- Gürgən-Pirallahı, town in Azerbaijan
