= Mir Movsum Agha =

Azerbaijani disabled person (1883–1950)

- Mir Mövsüm Ağa
- Born: 1883; Baku
- Died: 17 November 1950 (aged 66–67); Baku

Mir Movsum Agha (full name Azerbaijani: Seyidəli Mir Abutalıb oğlu Mirmövsümzadə, lit. 'Seyidali Mir Abutalib oghlu Mirmovsumzade'; 1883 – 17 November 1950) was a physically disabled person, who was believed to have supernatural powers by the residents of Baku and outskirt villages.

A shrine was built for Mir Movsum Agha in Shuvalan after his death; that shrine now has a blue maiolica, Central Asian-style dome.

The President of Azerbaijan, Ilham Aliyev and the First Lady Mehriban Aliyeva are regular visitors to Mir Movsum Aga's sanctuary. The First Lady once donated a carpet decorated with an image of Movsum Mir Aga that was made by painter Kamil Aliyev to the sanctuary. In 2011, historian Tarana Jabiyeva wrote a book about Mir Movsum Agha called "Eternal resident of Icheri-Shahar" that was presented by the Union of Writers of Azerbaijan.
