= Rock oil =

Rock oil may refer to:

- Mineral oil, a distillate of petroleum
- Naphtha, a flammable liquid hydrocarbon mixture
- Petroleum, a naturally occurring yellowish-black liquid mixture
- Rock oil (Scotland), an ointment made from a thin film obtained on rocks by the sea and used as a relief for burns and scalds
- Rock Oil, a character in the television series The Garfield Show

== See also ==
- Oil Rocks, an industrial settlement in Baku, Azerbaijan
