= Chilov =

Island of the Caspian Sea

Chilov Çilov adası Zhiloy
- Island of the Baku Archipelago
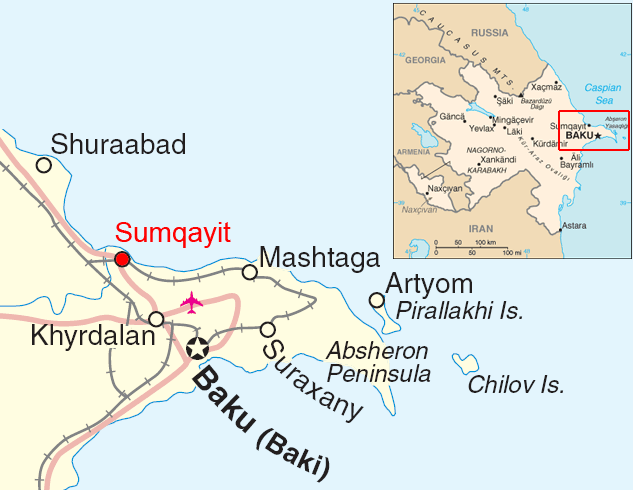
- Map of the Absheron peninsula and surrounding islands, with Chilov to the right

- Location within Caspian Sea
- Coordinates: 40°20′N 50°35′E
- Country: Azerbaijan
- Region: Absheron Region
- District: Pirallahi

Area
  - Total: 12 km^{2} (4.6 sq mi)
- Elevation: 8 m (26 ft)

Population
  - Total: 1,700

Chilov (Azerbaijani: Çilov adası, also spelt Zhiloy and Jiloi) is an island in the Caspian Sea. It is located off the Absheron Peninsula, 55 kilometres (34 mi) east of Baku.

== Geography ==
Chilov Island is located 25 km (16 mi) off the eastern end of the Apsheron Peninsula in the Caspian Sea, 100 km (62 mi) from Baku. Administratively, Chilov Island belongs to the Khazar district of Baku.

The island is 10 km (6 mi) across and has an irregular shape with various headlands and inlets. Its highest elevation is 8 metres (26 ft). Its area is about 6 km^{2} (2.3 sq mi).

=== Environment ===
The island forms part of the Absheron archipelago Important Bird Area (IBA), designated as such by BirdLife International because it supports significant populations of wintering whooper swans, common pochards, tufted ducks, great crested grebes and common coots, as well as breeding Caspian gulls.

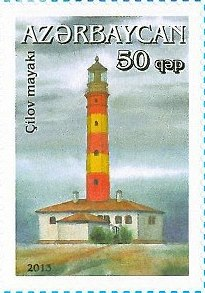
Chilov lighthouse

== History ==
Oil and gas deposits were discovered near Chilov island by Russian Rear Admiral Count Mark Voynovich while he led an expedition to the Caspian Sea in 1781.

In 1944, a geological expedition was established at the Azerbaijan Academy of Sciences. This expedition began geological explorations on Chilov Island. The first oil well there was drilled by Agagurban Aliyev.

In the 1950s, an air defense military unit of the USSR was stationed on the island, organizing air defense of Baku from the eastern part. For this purpose, the C75 anti-aircraft missile system was deployed on the island.

In 1992-1993, all Russian troops were withdrawn from the island.

== See also ==
- List of islands of Azerbaijan
