= Ruhulla Akhundov =

- Ruhulla Axundov
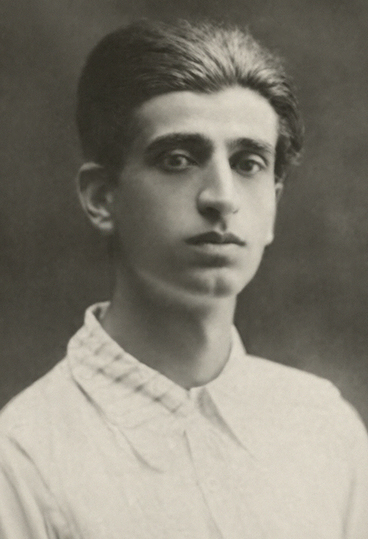
- Akhundov in the 1920s

Second Secretary of the Azerbaijan Communist Party
- In office 1925–1926

People's Commissar of Education of the Azerbaijani SSR
- In office 1927–1930
- Preceded by: Mustafa Quliyev
- Succeeded by: Maksud Mamedov

Personal details
- Born: January 1, 1897 Shuvalan, Baku Governorate, Russian Empire
- Died: April 21, 1938 (aged 41)
- Party: Communist Party of the Soviet Union (1919–1936)
- Spouse: Frida Naumovna Shlemovna
- Occupation: Publicist
- Awards: Order of Lenin

Ruhulla Akhundov (Azerbaijani: Руһулла Әли оғлу Ахундов, romanized: Ruhulla Əli oğlu Axundov; 1 January 1897 – 21 April 1938) was an Azerbaijani Soviet politician, publisher and journalist who was the Second Secretary of the Communist Party of Azerbaijan from 1925 to 1926, under the Soviet leadership of Joseph Stalin.

== Life and career ==
Akhundov was born into the family of a teacher. He spoke several eastern and western languages. From 1916, Akhundov worked in a printing house. In 1917 he was a member of a group of Azerbaijani Left-Socialist-Revolutionaries called the Farmers' Party. In 1918 he was the editor of the newspaper Izvestia of the Baku Council, and in 1919, the Azerbaijani illegal Bolshevik newspaper "Kommunist". In the same year he joined the Communist Party. After the final establishment of Soviet power in Azerbaijan, he became the head of the department for work in the villages of the Central Committee of the Communist Party (Bolsheviks) of the Azerbaijan SSR, then secretary of the Baku party committee, editor of the newspaper "Communist" and other periodicals. In the period from 1924 to 1930 Akhundov was secretary of the Central Committee of the Communist Party (Bolsheviks) of the Azerbaijan SSR, director of Azerneshra (state book publishing house) and served as People's Commissar of Education of the Azerbaijan SSR. He was criticized as a member of the “right-leftist bloc”. He made an admission of mistakes.

In 1930 Rukhulla Akhundov was elected secretary of the Transcaucasian Regional Committee of the VKP (b). Delegate of the 10 to17th Party Congresses and the 2nd Congress of the Communist International. The last years of his life he worked at the Institute of Party History under the Central Committee of the Communist Party (Bolsheviks) of Azerbaijan and was head of the department for arts affairs under the Council of People's Commissars of the Azerbaijan SSR. He participated in the organization and management of the Azerbaijan branch of the USSR Academy of Sciences. Akhundov was one of the first translators of the works of Karl Marx, Friedrich Engels and Lenin into Azerbaijani. He was an author of several works on the history, art, literature, editor of the two-volume Russian-Azerbaijani Dictionary (1928 -29).

In the 1930s, he was a member of the editorial board of the journal Revolution and Nationalities, which was the press organ of the People's Commissariat of Nationalities.

== Arrest and execution ==
In December 1936, Akhundov was removed from all posts and expelled from the party. In 1938, he was arrested for "participation in terrorist activities" and sentenced to execution by firing squad by Military Tribunal. He was executed on April 21, 1938, at Butovo firing range. Buried at the secret NKVD execution and burial site “Kommunarka–Loza.” In 1959, he was posthumously rehabilitated by Military Collegium of the Supreme Court of the USSR.

His wife, Frida Naumovna Shlyomova, was arrested twice by the NKVD after her husband’s death.
