= Çilov =

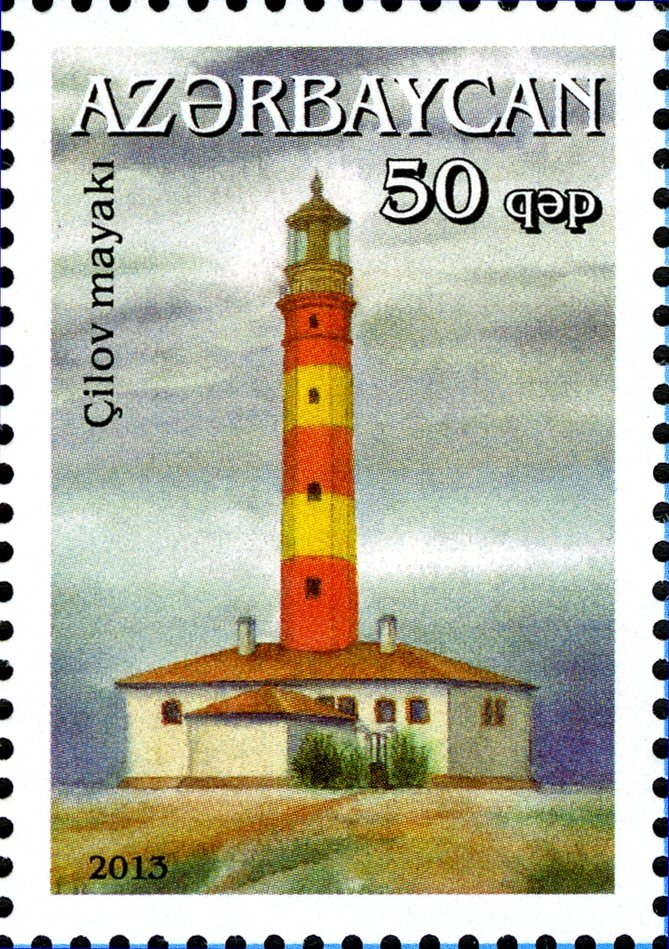
- Çhilov lighthouse

- Location within Azerbaijan
- Coordinates: 40°19′46″N 50°36′11″E
- Country: Azerbaijan
- District: Pirallahi, Baku
- Time zone: UTC+4 (AZT)
  - Summer (DST): UTC+5 (AZT)

Çilov (also, Cilov, Jiloy) is a village on Chilov Island in the municipality of Çilov-Neft Daşları in the Khazar raion of Baku, Azerbaijan. The village name was changed from Jiloy to Çilov on 5 October 1999.
