= Pirallahi Island =

Island of the Caspian Sea

Pirallahi Pirallahı adası / Artyom
- Island of the Baku Archipelago
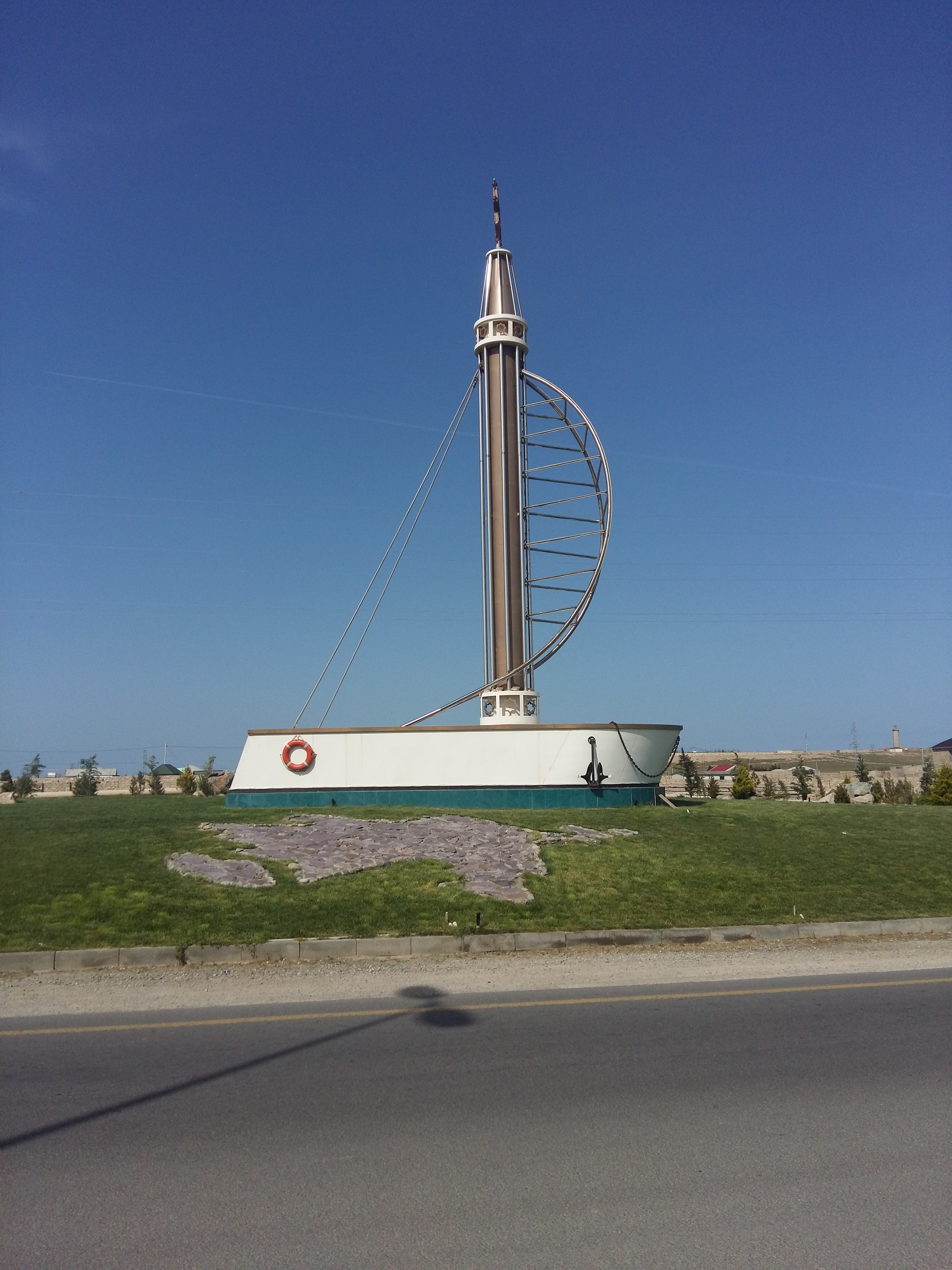
- Main entrance to the island.

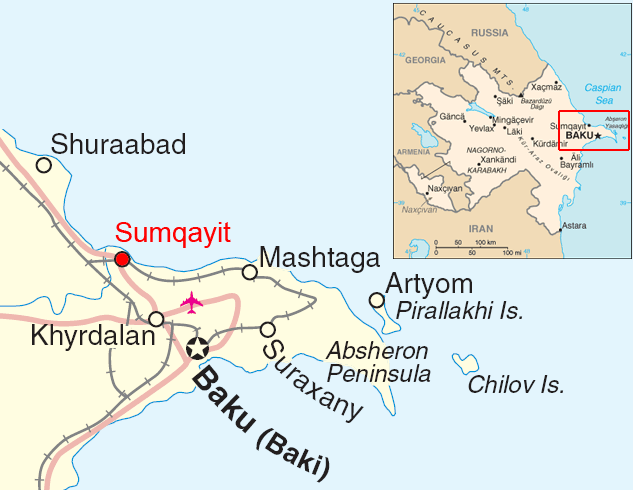
- Map showing Pirallahi Island off the Apsheron Peninsula.

- Location within Caspian Sea
- Coordinates: 40.4667°N 50.3167°E
- Country: Azerbaijan
- Region: Absheron Region
- Province: Baku
- District: Pirallahi

Area
  - Total: 14.6 km^{2} (5.6 sq mi)
- Elevation: 8 m (26 ft)

Population
  - Total: 20,578
- Time zone: UTC+4 (AZT)
  - Summer (DST): UTC+5 (AZT)

Pirallahi Island, or Pirallakhi Island (Azeri: Pirallahı adası) is an island of Azerbaijan in the Caspian Sea. The island lies off the north-eastern shore of the Apsheron Peninsula, 43 kilometres (27 mi) east-north-east of Baku.

== Geography ==
The island is 11 kilometres (6.8 mi) long and has a maximum width of 4 kilometres (2.5 mi). Administratively, Pirallahi Island belongs to the Pirallahi district of Baku. The total area of the island is 14.6 km^{2}. In 1968 the population of the village of Artyom-Ostrov reached 14,400 people. The population of the island is 17,281 people (according to the 2020 census), the density is ~ 3000 people / km^{2}.

=== Environment ===
The island forms part of the Absheron archipelago Important Bird Area (IBA), designated as such by BirdLife International because it supports significant populations of wintering whooper swans, common pochards, tufted ducks, great crested grebes and common coots, as well as breeding Caspian gulls.

== History ==
Pirallahi literally means "the shrine of Allah", from the word pir - a shrine / holy place. In ancient times, there was a place of worship and pilgrimage on the island, but there is no exact data on which religion it belongs to. According to one version, it was a shrine of the Zoroastrians, and according to others, Muslims.

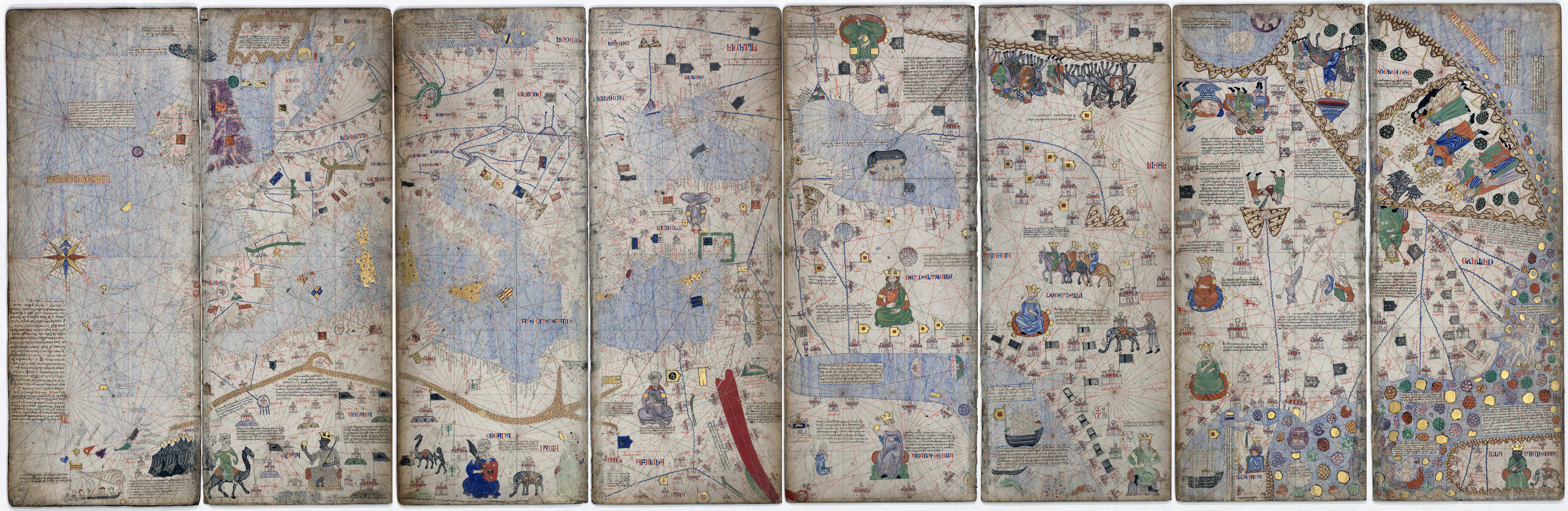
1375 Atlas Catalan Abraham Cresques

The Catalans in 1375 entered Baku on the map as the center city of the whole Caspian Sea, and next to it was Priala.

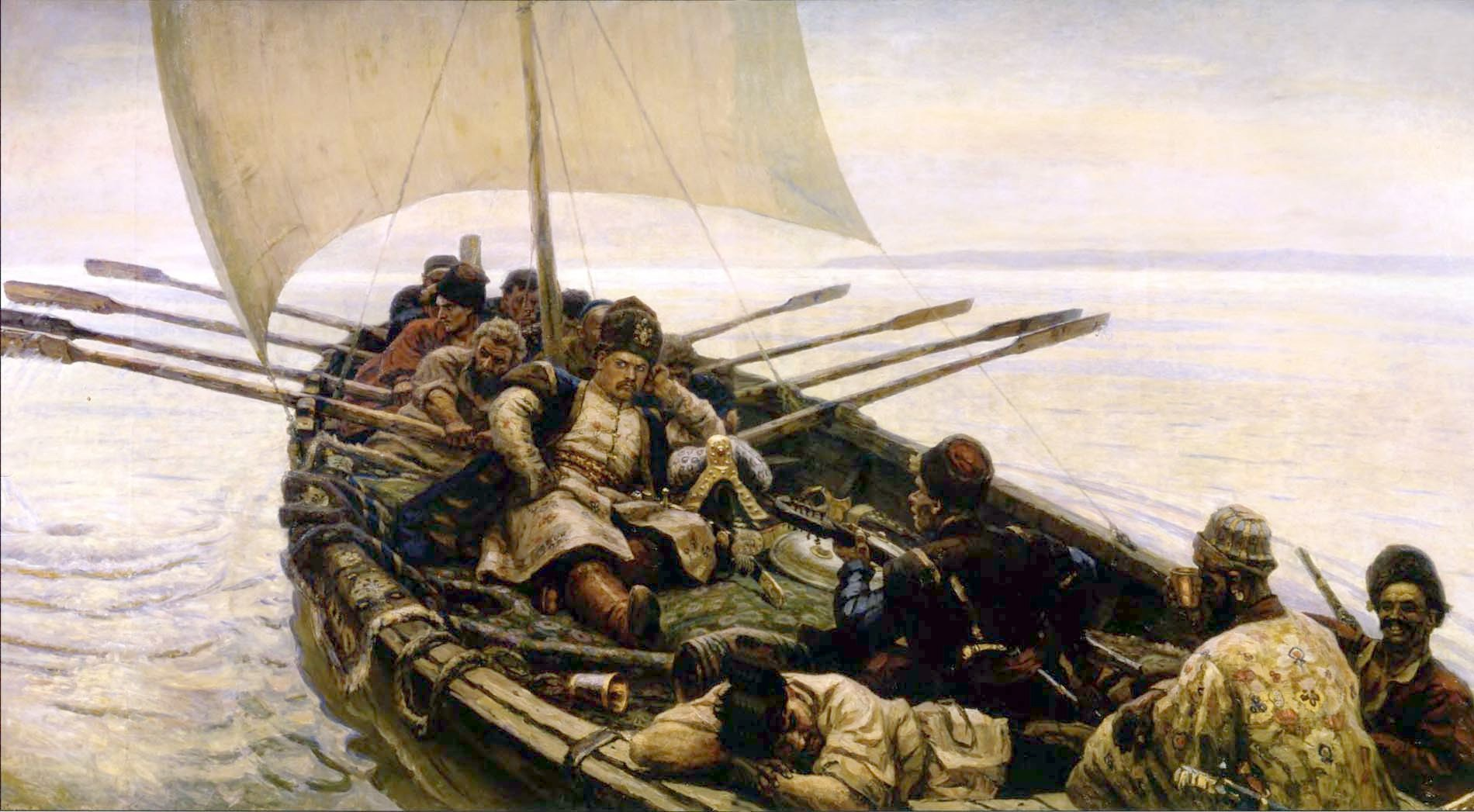
The Cossack Stenka Razin in the Caspian Sea (Vasily Surikov)

During Russian Imperial times the island's name was Svyatoy (from Russian: Святой - "The holy one"). It is said that undersea booty from a 1660 sea battle between Persians and Cossack leader Stepan Razin lies off the northern tip of the island.

Pirallahi Island is said to be among the first places where oil was extracted in Azerbaijan, and in the 1820s it was divided into two separate areas, one residential, and another where oil was refined into paraffin. In 1934, oil explorers dropped metal drills off piers from the island, which at the time was considered an advancement in offshore oil exploration.

=== Artyom Island ===
While Azerbaijan was part of the Soviet Union, the island was renamed Artyom Island in 1936 (Russian: Остров Артёма) after the pioneer revolutionary Comrade Artyom (Fyodor Sergeyev). Pirallahi Island still has a settlement called Artyom.

The old Artyom village was evacuated due to rising water levels of the Caspian Sea, and residents moved to a series of apartment towers built by German prisoners in 1948. On 5 October 1999, the current name was returned.

In the early 1950s, by the construction of a dam, the island was connected to the mainland and thus transformed from an island into a peninsula. In 2016, a road bridge was built on the site of the dam, under which ships can pass

== Infrastructure ==
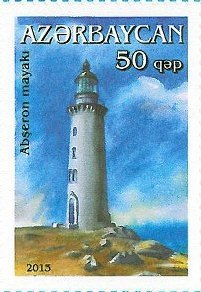
Pirallahi Lighthouse

- The Pirallahi Lighthouse, the biggest lighthouse in Azerbaijan, is the Absheron lighthouse, located in the territory of the Gurgen settlement. The lighthouse, built on hard rocky cliffs at Pirallahi Island in 1859, was commissioned on 23 October 1860.
- Oil and gas production is carried out on the island. Oil deposits on the northern part of Pirallahi are estimated at 1.2 million tons.
- Fishing is widespread among the population, and there is a fishing port on the island.
- Flights to other Caspian isles are available at the heliport on the southern tip of the island.
- To increase the production of alternative and renewable energy and improve its quality, the Pirallahi solar power plant with a capacity of 2.8 megawatts was commissioned in the Pirallahi district of Baku. The construction of the Pirallahi solar power plant was launched in 2014. After completion of construction by the end of 2020, the plant's capacity will be 12.8 megawatts.
- A 50-hectare industrial park, High-Tech Park, dedicated to the ICT industry, is being established on the island by the Azerbaijan Ministry of Communications and Information Technologies.

== Gallery ==
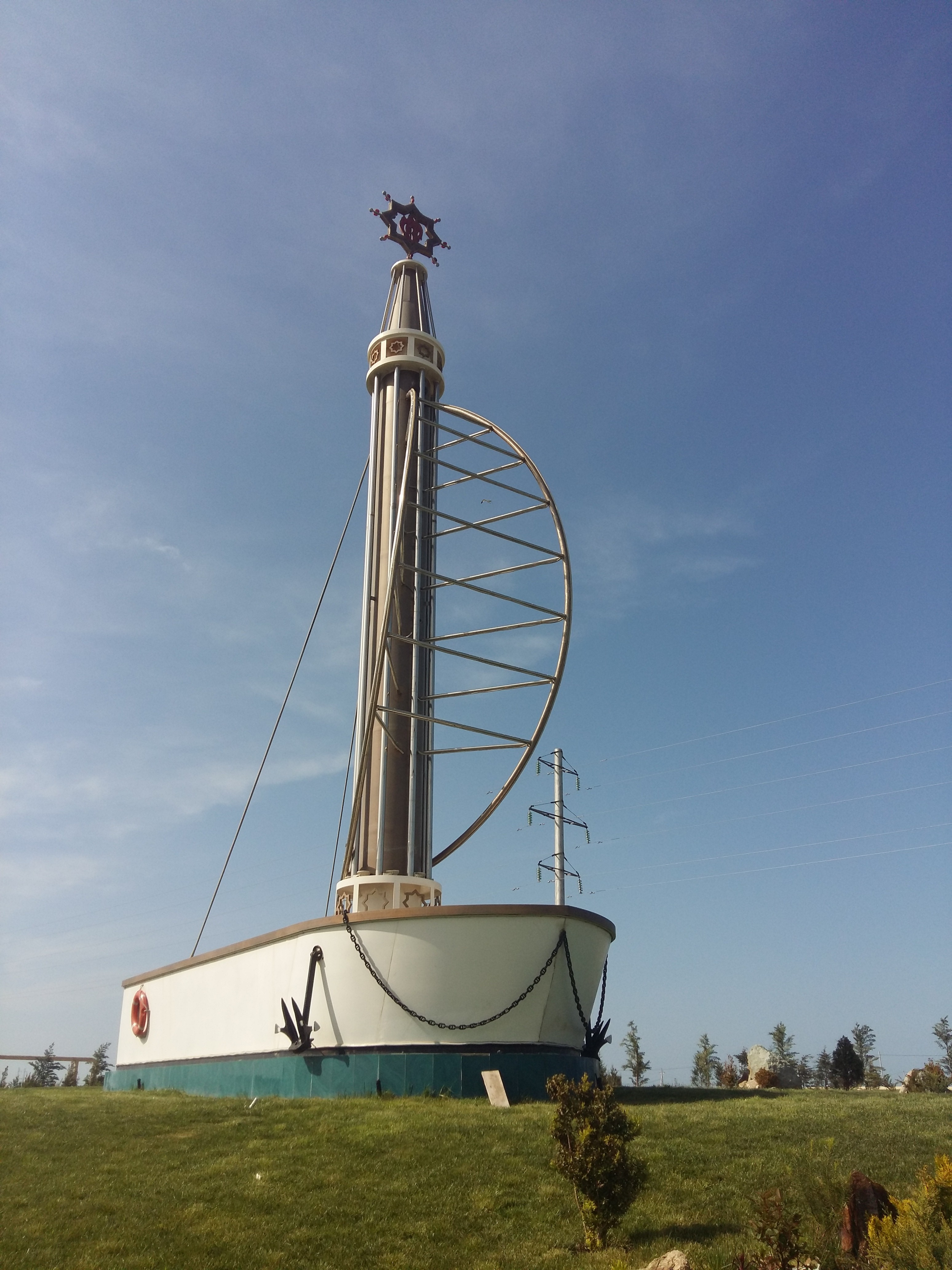
Pirallahi District

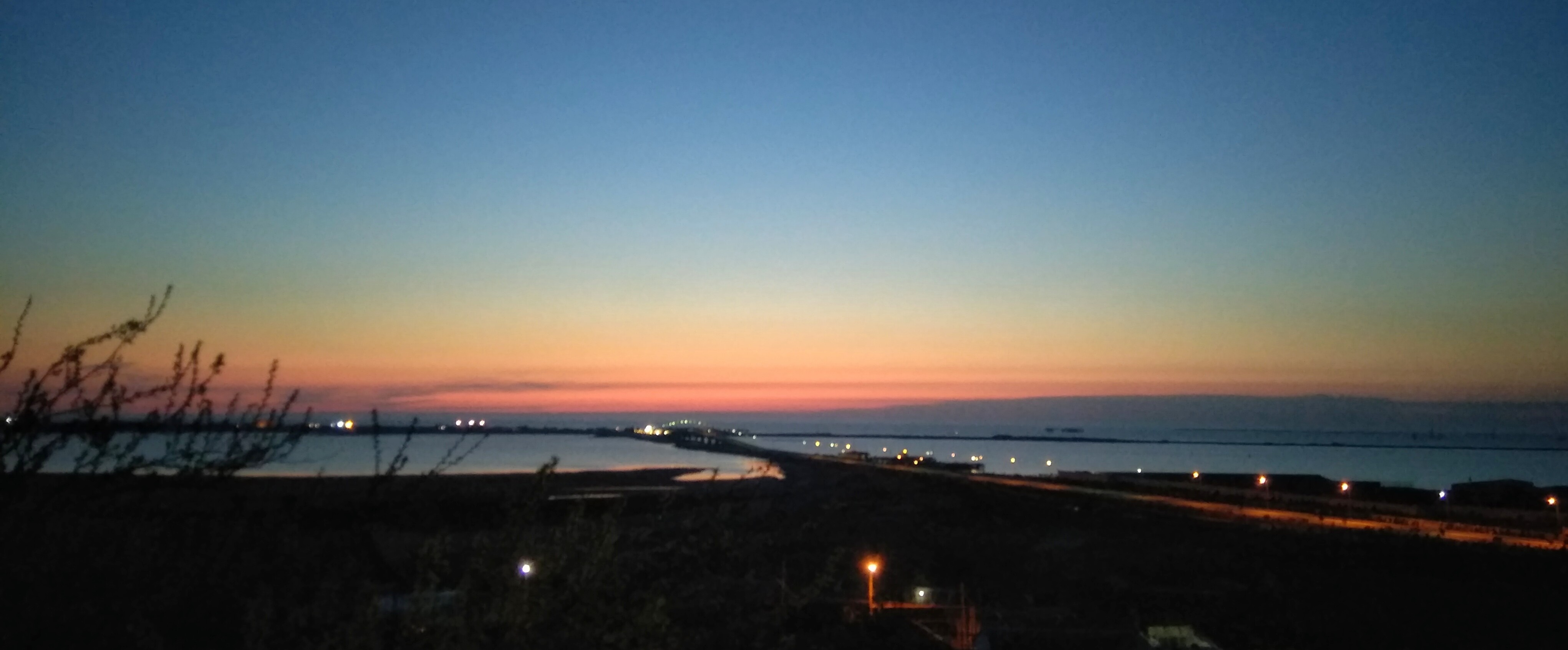
Pirallahi Bridge

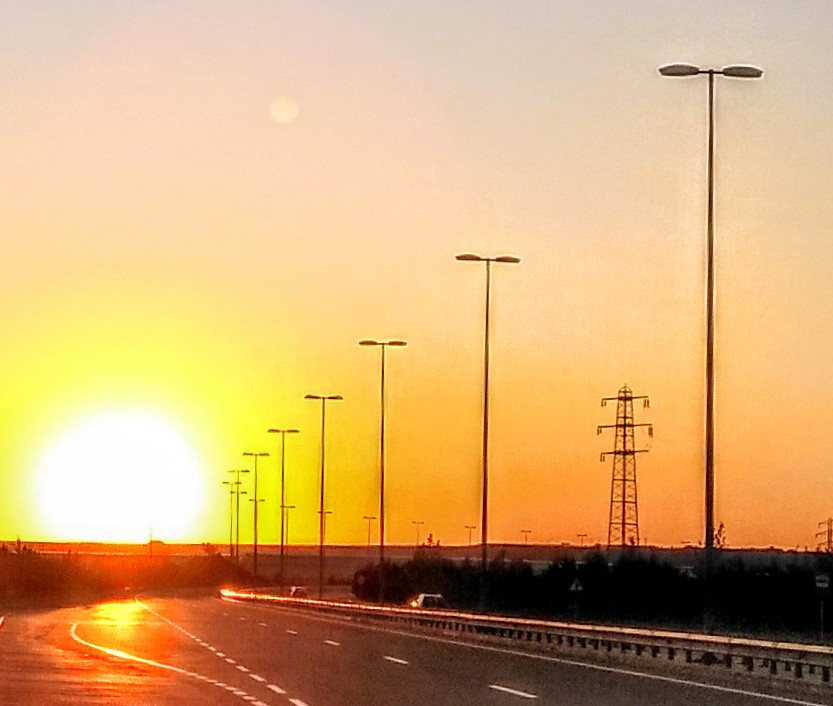
Pirallahi Road

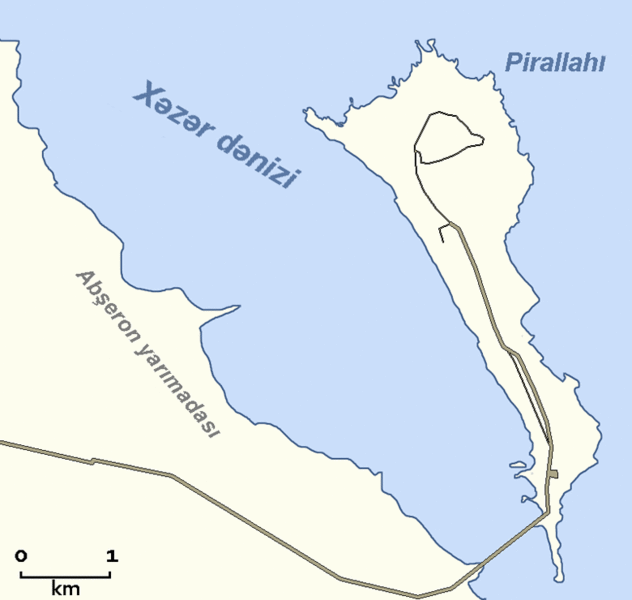
Map of Pirallahi

== See also ==
- List of islands of Azerbaijan
