= Pirallahı, Baku =

Pirallahi
- Residential Buildings

- Location in Azerbaijan
- Coordinates: 40°28′15″N 50°19′18″E
- Country: Azerbaijan
- District: Baku

Pirallahı is a village in the municipality of Gürgən-Pirallahı in the Pirallahi Rayon of Baku, Azerbaijan. It is located on Pirallahi Island. As of 1968, the town had a population of 14,400. The former name of this place was Artyom, named after Fyodor Sergeyev (nom de guerre Artem or Artyom). Previously, it was named in honor of the 26 Baku Commissars.

Pirallahı is a port town, and oil and gas are important to the local economy. The rising waters of the Caspian Sea has prompted the removal of a significant portion of the population.

== Notable natives ==
- Sergey Murtuzaliyev — National Hero of Azerbaijan.
