= Svinoy (Caspian Sea) =

Svinoy Sangi Mugan
- Island
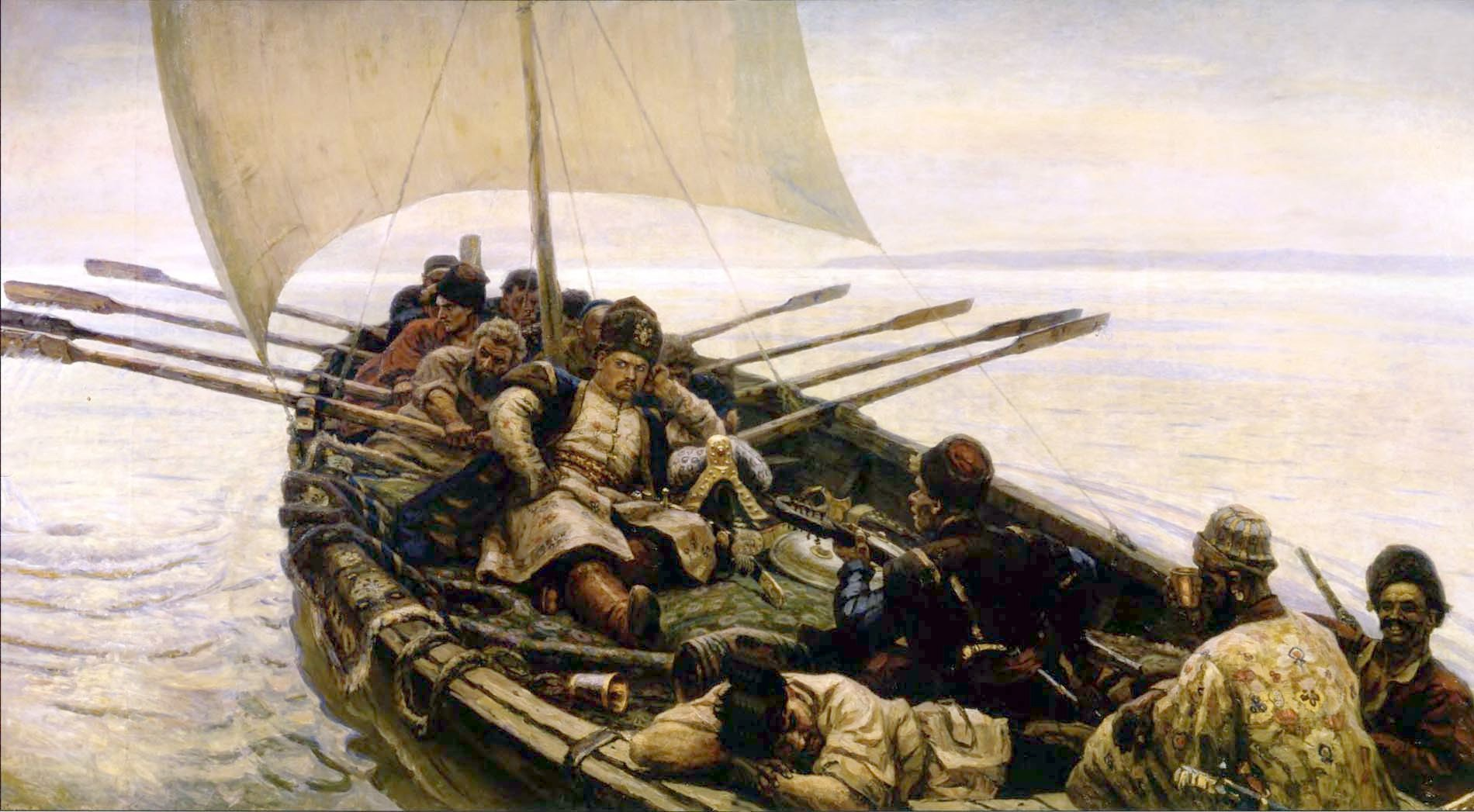
- The Cossack Stenka Razin (Vasily Surikov)

- Location within Caspian Sea
- Coordinates: 39°45′N 49°35′E
- Country: Azerbaijan
- Region: Absheron Region

Svinoy, Sangi-Mugan Island or Muğan daşı (Azerbaijani: Səngi Muğan, Russian: Ostrov Svinoy), is an island in the Caspian Sea located south of Baku, Azerbaijan.

== Geography ==
This island lies south of the Baku Archipelago, 16 km off the shore. Svinoy is about 1 km in length and 0.6 km wide. Although geographically quite far from Baku, This island is considered part of the Baku Archipelago.

On Svinoy Island, there is an automatic station for the monitoring of local water pollution.

== History ==
Stenka Razin's Cossacks crushed the fleet of the Safavid Shah Suleiman I of Persia in the waters off Svinoy Island in 1669. The southern bay of the island is an ideal place for underwater archaeology.

== See also ==
- List of islands of Azerbaijan
