= Kamil Aliyev (artist) =

Kamil Aliyev Kamil Əliyev
- Born: October 22, 1922; Erivan, Erivan uezd, Armenian SSR, TSFSR
- Died: March 1, 2005 (aged 82); Baku, Azerbaijan
- Resting place: Alley of Honor
- Occupation: carpet artist
- Awards

Kamil Museyib oghlu Aliyev (Azerbaijani: Kamil Müseyib oğlu Əliyev, October 22, 1922–March 1, 2005) was an Azerbaijani carpet artist, professor, People's Artist of the Azerbaijan SSR (1982), the first holder of the title of Master of Applied Arts of the Azerbaijan SSR (1960).

== Biography ==
Kamil Aliyev was born on October 22, 1921, in Erivan. In 1936, Kamil Aliyev, who was admitted to the Baku Art School, studied here in the decoration department for 3 years and, with the advice of his teachers, began to work in the experimental laboratory of the "Azerkhalcha" association.

After returning from the army in 1946, Kamil Aliyev, a participant in the World War II, continued his profession. For a while, he headed the Republican Art Fund, and later worked as a director at the Baku jewelry factory. In those years, he showed himself as a skilled artistic developer and ornamental artist not only in textiles such as lace and fabric, but also in gold, silver and other materials. Since the 1950s, the creation of plot carpets and portrait carpets took a leading position in the creativity of Kamil Aliyev.

Kamil Aliyev dedicated his first portrait carpet in 1958 to the 400th anniversary of the birth of the great Azerbaijani poet Fuzuli. This carpet is included in the permanent exposition of the National Art Museum of Azerbaijan. The artist also created carpets dedicated to famous people such as Imadaddin Nasimi, Nizami Ganjavi, Indira Gandhi, Mustafa Kemal Atatürk.

His works have been exhibited in prestigious museums and galleries in Paris, London, Tokyo, Delhi, Ankara, Istanbul, Tehran, Moscow, Kiev and other cities.

Kamil Aliyev died on March 1, 2005, in Baku. On October 26, 2007, a memorial plaque in front of the house and a house museum were opened where Kamil Aliyev used to live.

== Awards ==
- Master of Applied Arts of the Azerbaijan SSR — May 24, 1960
- Honored Artist of the Azerbaijan SSR — July 7, 1967
- People's Artist of the Azerbaijan SSR — December 1, 1982
- Istiglal Order — December 27, 1999
- Order of the Badge of Honour
- Order of the Patriotic War
- Medal "For Battle Merit" — April 22, 1943
- Medal "For the Defence of the Caucasus" — April 23, 1945
- Medal "For the Victory over Germany in the Great Patriotic War 1941–1945"
- Jubilee Medal "Thirty Years of Victory in the Great Patriotic War 1941–1945"
- Jubilee Medal "Forty Years of Victory in the Great Patriotic War 1941–1945"
- Jubilee Medal "In Commemoration of the 100th Anniversary of the Birth of Vladimir Ilyich Lenin"
