= Pirallahı raion =

Pirallahı
- Raion
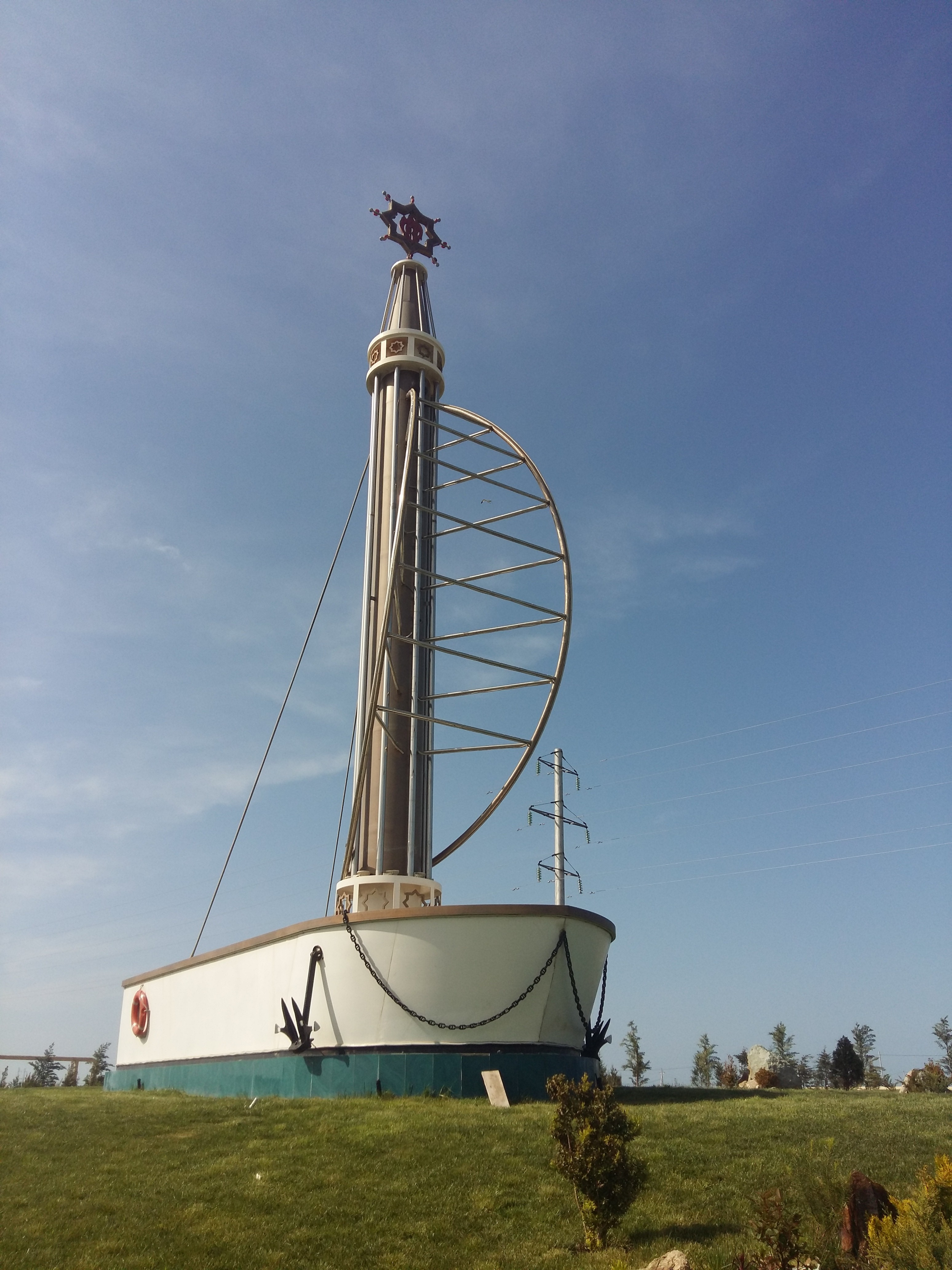
- Pirallahi Island

- Location within Azerbaijan
- Coordinates: 40°23′N 49°50′E
- Country: Azerbaijan
- City: Baku
- Time zone: UTC+4 (AZT)
  - Summer (DST): UTC+4 (AZT)

Pirallahı raion (Azerbaijani: Pirallahı Rayonu) is a municipal district of the city of Baku, capital of Azerbaijan. It contains three settlements: Pirallahı, Çilov and Neft Daşları.
