= Gürgən-Pirallahı =

Municipality of Azerbaijan

Coordinates: 40°25′N 50°21′E

Gürgən-Pirallahı is a municipality in the Khazar Rayon of Baku, Azerbaijan. It has a population of 14,060. The municipality consists of the villages of Gürgən and Pirallahı.
