= Neft Daşları =

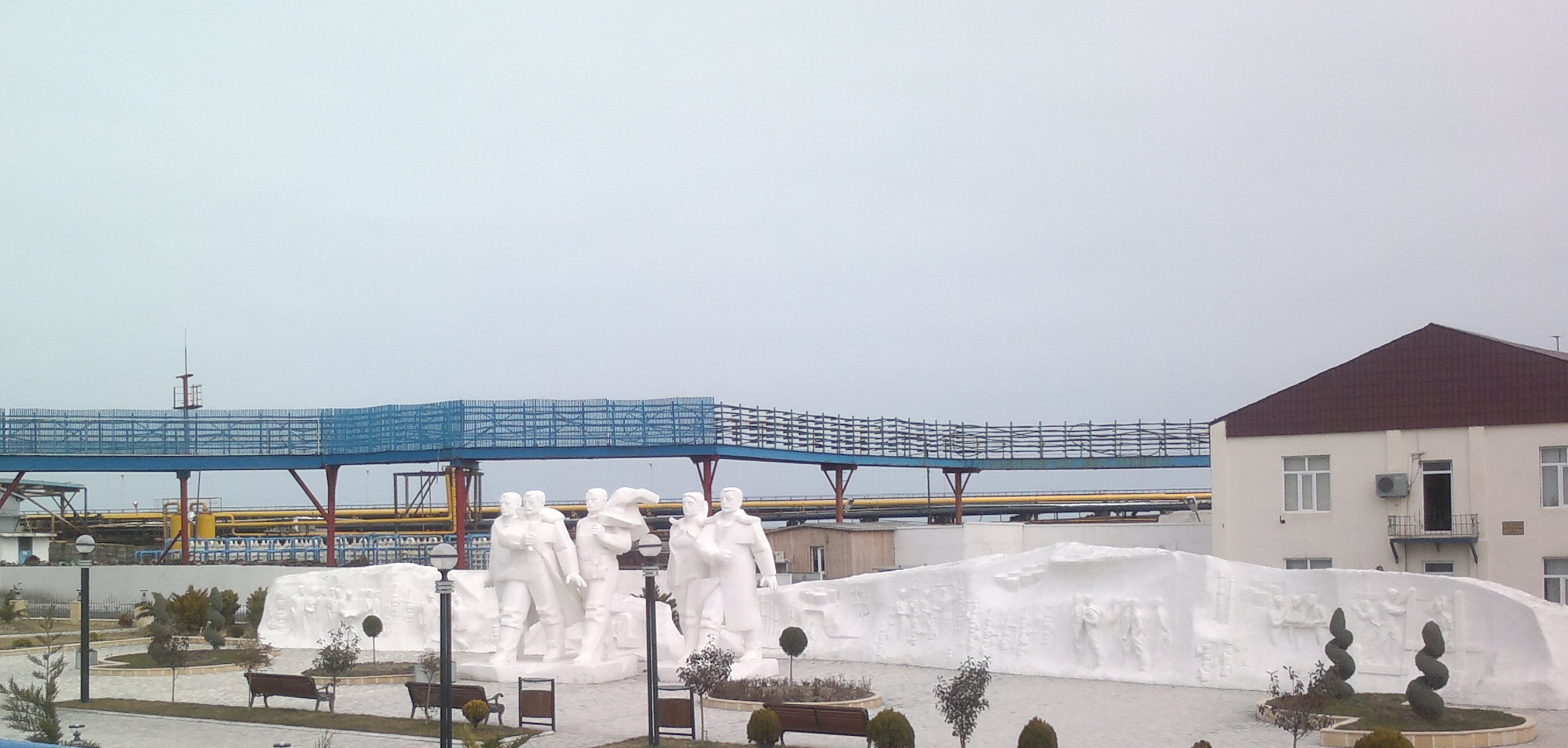
- Oil Rocks monuments

- Location within Caspian Sea Location within Azerbaijan
- Coordinates: 40°14′10″N 50°51′30″E
- Country: Azerbaijan
- City: Baku
- Raion: Pirallahı
- Municipality: Çilov-Neft Daşları

Population (2008)
  - Total: 2,000
- Time zone: UTC+4 (AZT)

Neft Daşları (Azerbaijani pronunciation: [ˈneft dɑʃlɑˈɾɯ] lit. 'Oil Rocks') is an industrial settlement in Baku, Azerbaijan. The settlement forms part of the municipality of Çilov-Neft Daşları in the Pirallahı raion. It lies 86 km (53 mi) away from Baku and 39 km (24 mi) from the nearest mainland shore in the Caspian Sea. A full town on the sea, it was the first oil platform in Azerbaijan, and the first operating offshore oil platform in the world, incorporating numerous drilling platforms. It is featured in Guinness World Records as the world's first offshore oil platform.

The settlement began with a single path out over the water and grew into a system of paths and platforms built upon ships sunk to serve as the Neft Daşları's foundation. The most distinctive feature of Neft Daşları is that it is actually a functional city with a population of around 2,000 and once comprised over 200 km (120 mi) of streets built on piles of landfill.

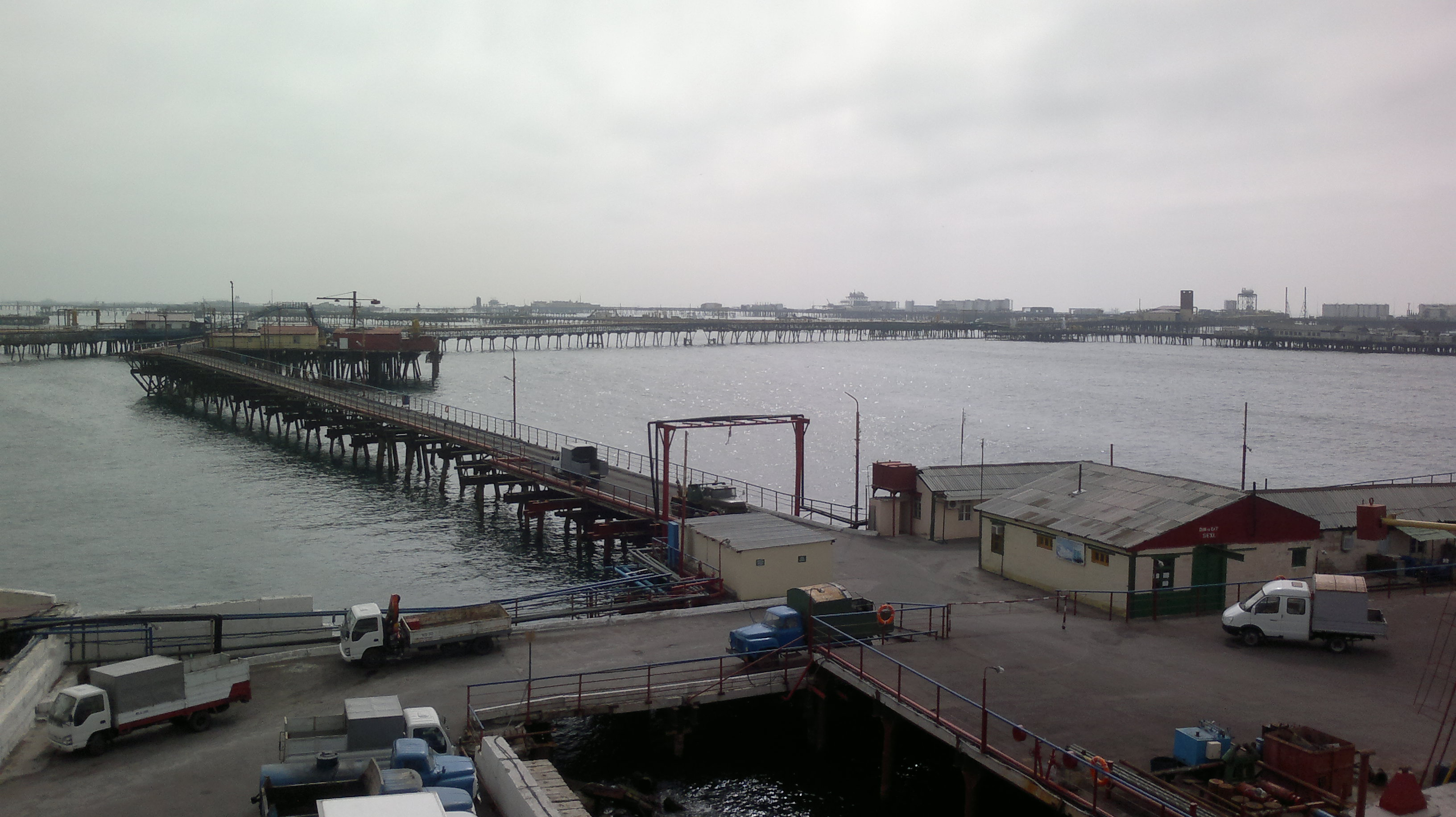
Oil Rocks

== Etymology ==
The settlement was originally named Chornye Kamni (Russian for "Black Rocks"), but was later renamed to Neftyanye Kamni (Russian for "Petroleum Rocks"), in Azerbaijani nowadays Neft Daşları (id.), replacing the allusion to the black colour of oil with a reference to the substance itself.

== History ==
=== Construction of the settlement ===
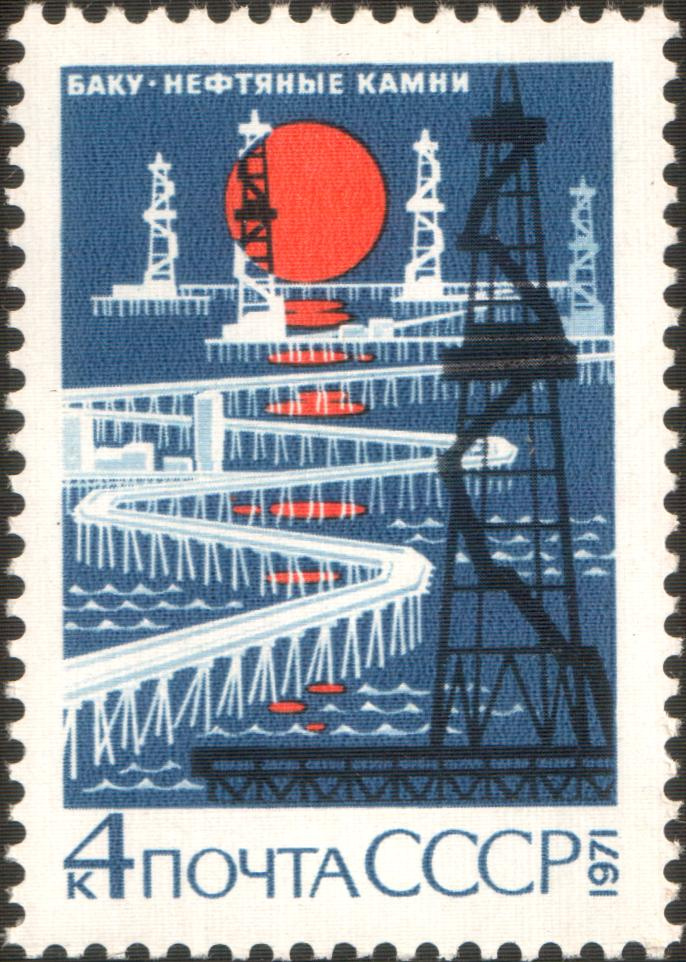
Soviet 1971 stamp, featuring Oil Rocks

The first large-scale geological study of the area was conducted in 1945–1948. The settlement of Neft Daşları was built after oil was discovered there on 7 November 1949 at 1,100 metres (3,600 ft) beneath the Caspian Sea. It became the world's first offshore oil platform.

By 1951, the Neft Daşları was ready for production, equipped with all the infrastructure needed at the time. Drilling platforms were erected, oil tanks installed, and docks with enclosures for ships were built. The first oil from the Neft Daşları was loaded into a tanker in the same year.

In 1952, the systematic construction of trestle bridges connecting the artificial islands was begun. A number of Soviet factories constructed crane assemblies especially for use on the Neft Daşları, along with a crane barge that could carry up to 100 tons of oil. The assemblies were equipped with diesel hammers used to drive piles into the sea floor.

Large-scale construction started on the settlement in 1958, which included nine-story hostels, hotels, cultural palaces, bakery factories and lemonade workshops. The mass development of Neft Daşları continued during 1976–1978 with the building of a five-story dormitory and two oil-gas compressor stations, the installation of a drinking water facility, and the construction of two underwater pipelines to the Dubendi terminal, each with a diameter of 350 millimetres (14 in). In addition, a flyover for vehicular traffic was created. As a result, the area of the settlement grew to around 7 hectares (17 acres) in the 1960s, with the length of the steel trestle bridges joining the man-made islands exceeding 200 kilometres (120 mi), although much has since fallen into the Caspian sea.

=== Post-independence ===
In November 2009, the settlement celebrated its 60th anniversary. Over the last 60 years, the oilfields of Neft Daşları have produced more than 170 million tons of oil and 15 billion cubic metres of associated natural gas. According to present-day estimates by geologists, the volume of recoverable reserves is as high as 30 million tons. The oil platforms have gradually fallen into disrepair, and no refurbishment plans are currently underway.

== Demographics ==
As of 2008, the settlement's platforms had a combined population of approximately 2,000 residents, consisting of people working in week-long offshore shifts. At its peak in the 1960s and 70s, the population reached 5,000 workers.

== Oil extraction ==
The oil extraction is carried out from the shallow water portion of the Absheron geological trend.

== Accidents ==
On 4 December 2015, three workers of SOCAR were reported missing after part of the living quarters fell into the sea due to a heavy storm.

== In popular culture ==
- In 2008, a Swiss documentary crew led by film director Marc Wolfensberger filmed "La Cité du Pétrole / Oil Rocks – City above the Sea" in the settlement, which was released in 2009. Vimeo
- Neft Daşları is featured in a scene in the James Bond film The World Is Not Enough (1999).
- Neft Daşları is on the list in the Guinness Book as the oldest offshore oil platform.
