= Monument to the "Guba" ship sailors =

- "Quba" gəmisinin dənizçilərinə qoyulmuş abidə (Azerbaijani)
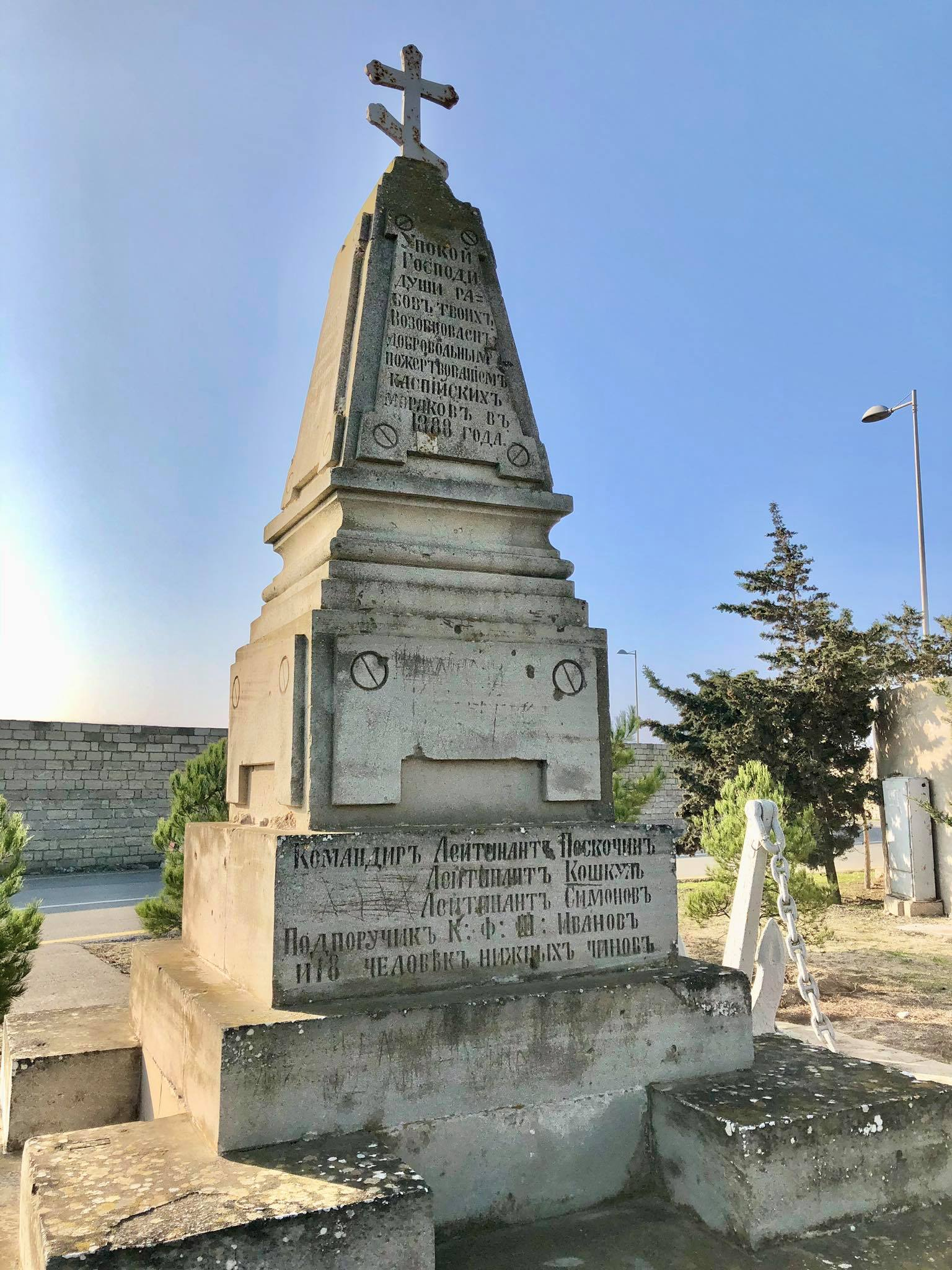

- Location within Azerbaijan
- Location: Shuvalan, Baku, Azerbaijan

History
- Built: 1889

Site notes
- Architect: Johann Edel

The monument to the sailors of the ship "Guba" – is a monument to the sailors who died as a result of the ship "Guba" sinking, which was conducting research in the Caspian Sea, at Cape Shuvelan on 14 September 1857. As a result of the crash, 22 crew members died, 57 people were rescued. After this tragedy, in order to ensure the safety of ships, the construction of lighthouses on Absheron began. The author of the monument's project, erected in 1889 in Shuvalan, was the architect Johann Edel.

== History ==
After the completing the conquering process of the Azerbaijani khanates by the tsarist Russia, in the late 1850s, the exploration of the Caspian Sea began by the means of a special Caspian astronomical and hydrographic expedition. The main task of the expedition was a comprehensive and complete description of the Caspian Sea in order to draw up its detailed and accurate map. The expedition was led by the captain of the 2nd rank, hydrograph specialist Nikolay Ivashintsov. In 1856, the expedition started the work. But in the same year the astronomer of the expedition died of cholera.

On 11 September 1857, the Caspian astro-hydrographic expedition departed from Astrakhan to Baku on the "Guba" ship along with valuable data in order to compile a more accurate map of the Caspian. The data collected under the leadership of Nikolai Ivashintsov, was awaited in Baku by the military, as well as by the local authorities. On 14 September, the weather was cloudy, windy and rainy. By the evening, when the ship had already reached Absheron, the wind intensified even more. The ship hit pitfalls twice. Due to these blows the side of the steamer broke in the bow, also the pumps of the ships engine burst. Having received damages in many places due to the impact of the waves, the ship started to sink. The head of the expedition plunged into the sea with the ship, but was carried by the waves to the rock and was able to grab the end of a rope. The warrant officer Yasensky pulled him to the shore. The commander of the steamer, Lieutenant Poskochin, Lieutenant Koshkul and Lieutenant Simonov died. Together with them, all the research and notes of the expedition perished. During the night, the most seriously wounded were transported by cart to Shuvelan village. All officers and lower ranks were housed in the home of the retired officer Abdul Akhundov, who, with the help of the local authorities, provided the survivors with food and clothing. On 15 September, the Baku Sea Station commander, the Captain of the 1st Rank K. Freygang and the district chief L. Pigulevsky, arrived at the crash site. On 16 September, all the wounded were transported to Baku, a day later the rest of the team with officers arrived there. The Chief Commander of the Astrakhan Port and the Caspian Flotilla, Rear Admiral Wolf, headed the commission of inquiry created to study the incident. During the investigation, it turned out that the loss of the steamer was not due to a crew error, but from the impact of the ship on an underwater, previously unknown and unmarked stone ridge, as well as due to an unexpected change in wind direction during a storm and the heavy fog.

The Caspian expeditions led by Ivashintsov continued until 1867. He was the first to explain the reasons for the change in the coastline, the peculiarities of currents, the disappearance and emergence of the islands of the Caspian Sea. Under the leadership of Ivashintsov, 61 astronomical points were determined, for the first time a detailed measurement of the entire Caspian Sea was made, depths of over 900 m were discovered, samples of water and soil were collected. On the basis of his research, an atlas of the Caspian Sea was published 20 years later, and later a depth map was compiled.

== Installation of the monument ==
Most of the victims were buried near the crash site, in a common mass grave, over which a modest monument was erected. On 30 November 1887, this grave was visited by the Captain of the 2nd rank P. Orlov, who found the monument in a deplorable state. He came to the decision to raise money for the repair of the monument. This proposal was well received by the Prince L. Ukhtomsky, and Orlov began raising funds. From 15 December 1887 to 23 August 1889, 124 people donated a total of 277 rubles and 74 kopecks for the construction of the monument. The author of the monument erected in 1889 became Johann Edel.

After the Soviet occupation, the monument remained in desolation. The cross from the monument was dismantled. Already during the period of independence of Azerbaijan, in 2005, closer to the 60th anniversary of the Victory Day in the Great Patriotic War, the monument was restored.

== Photo gallery ==
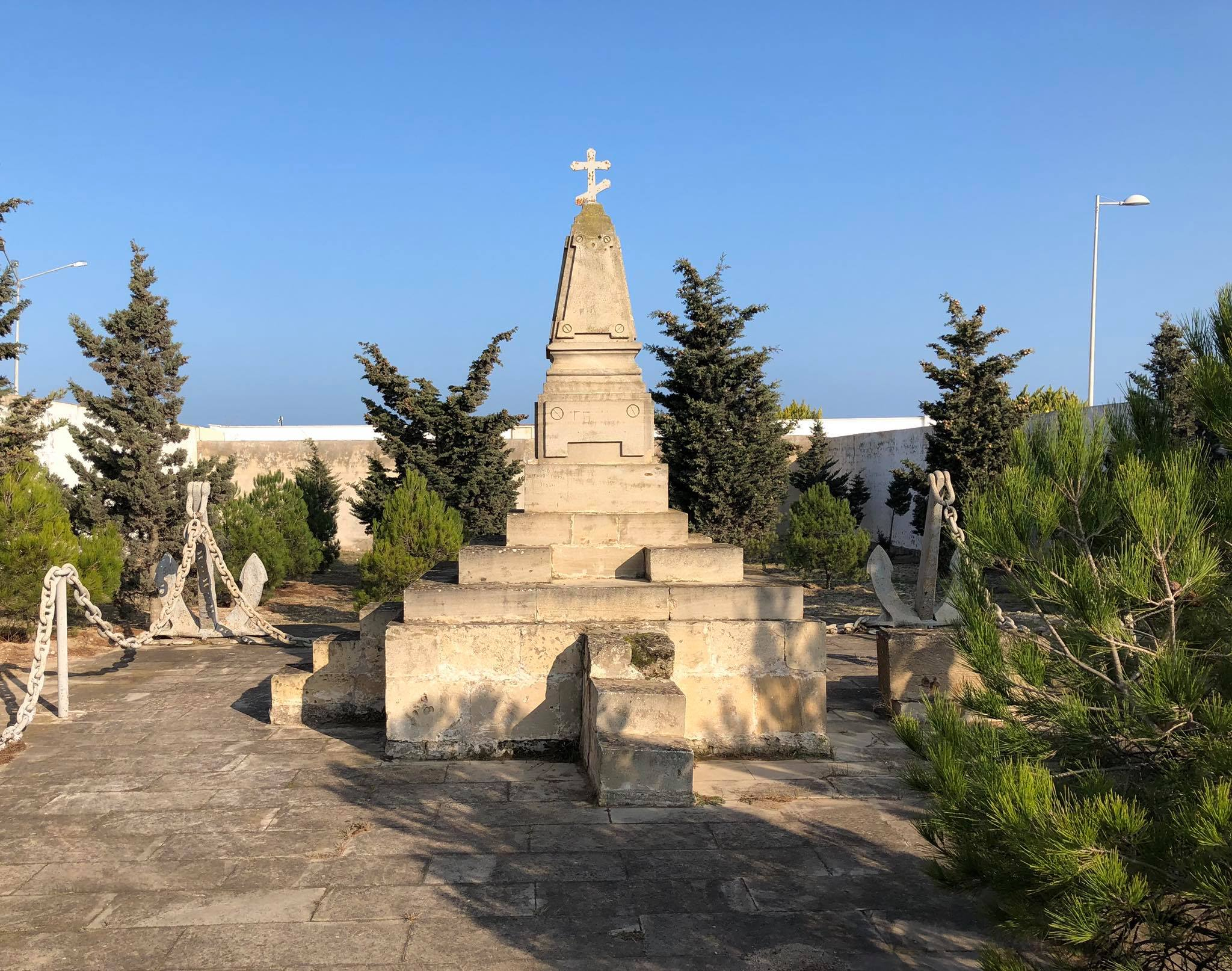

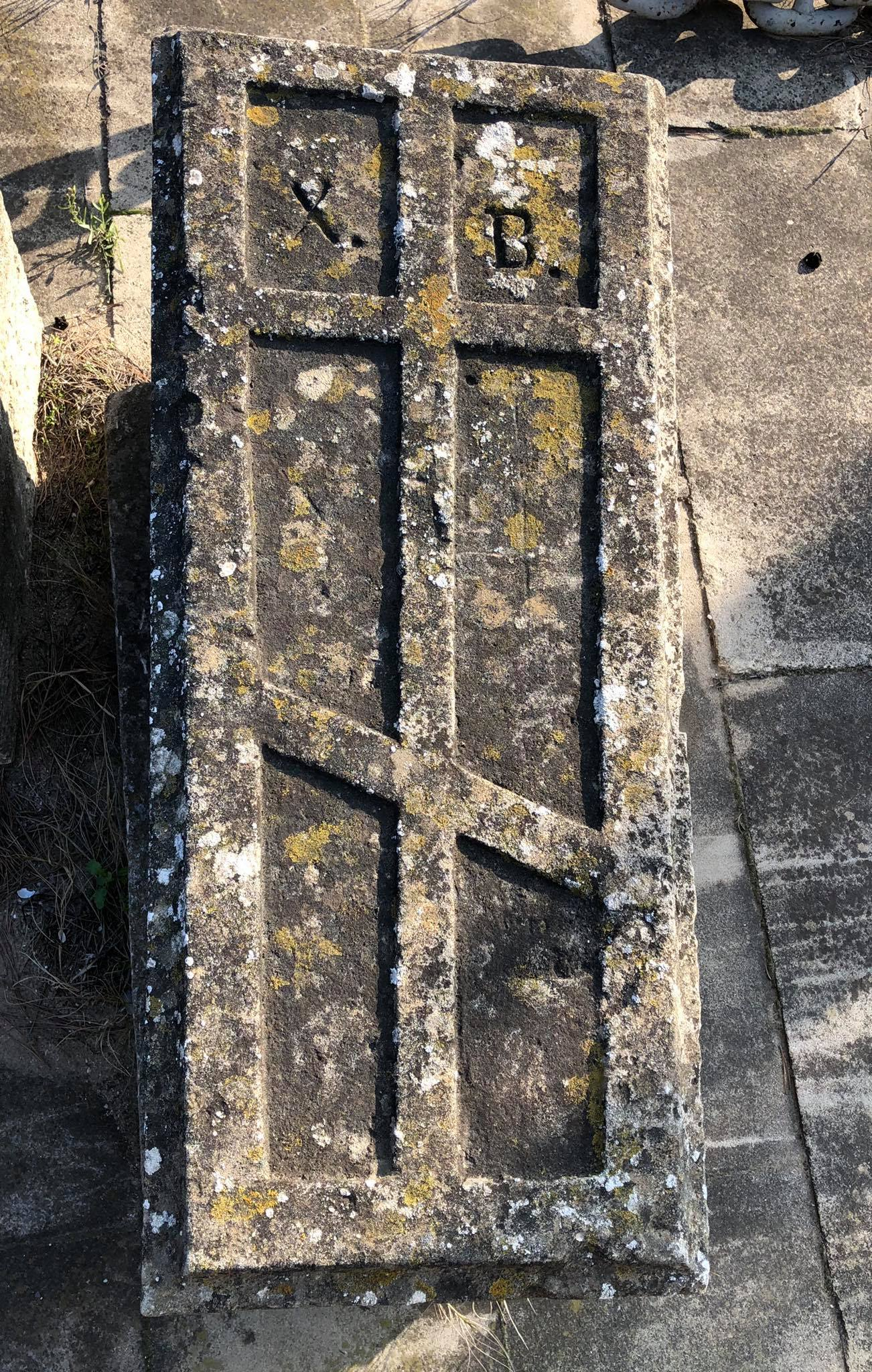

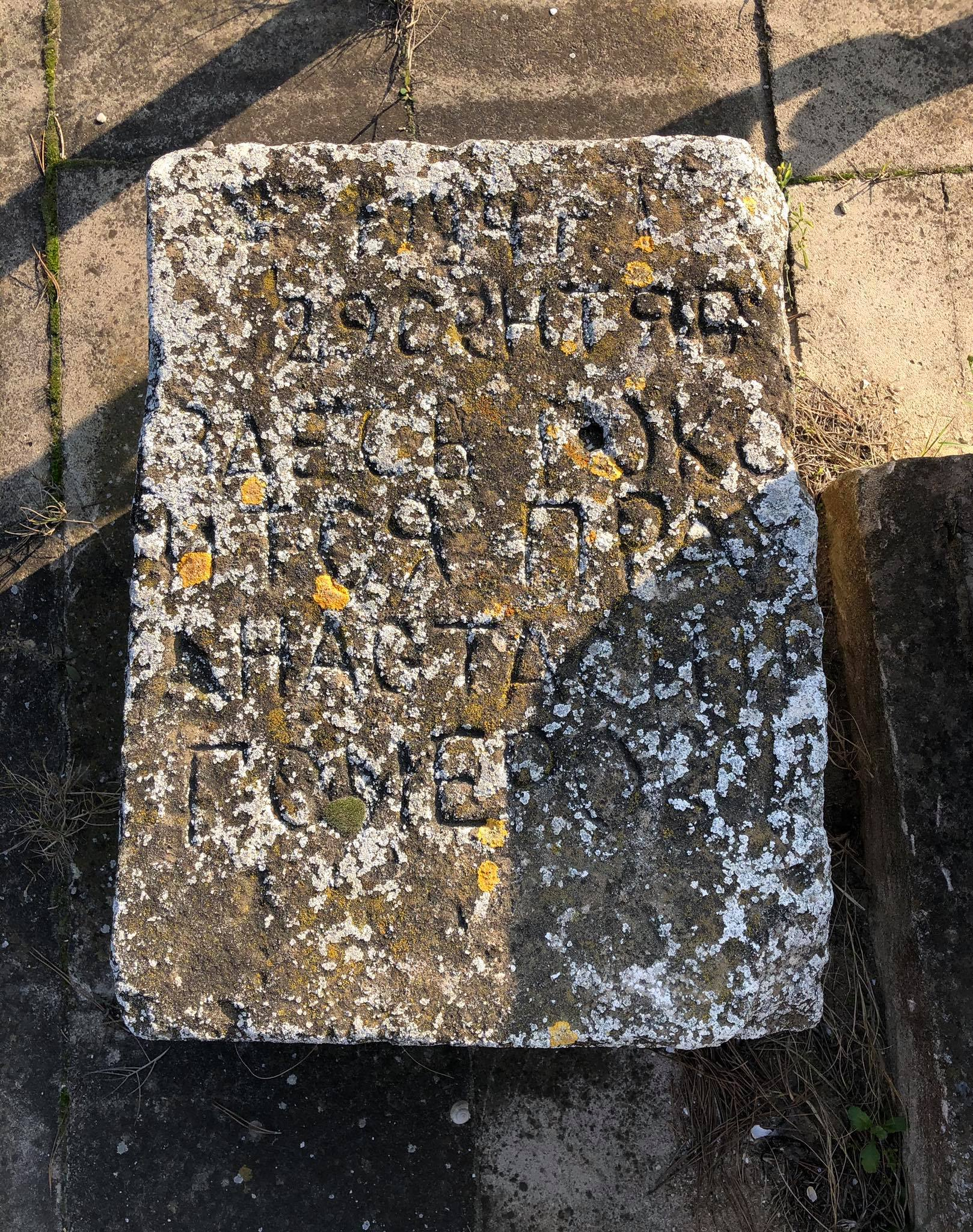

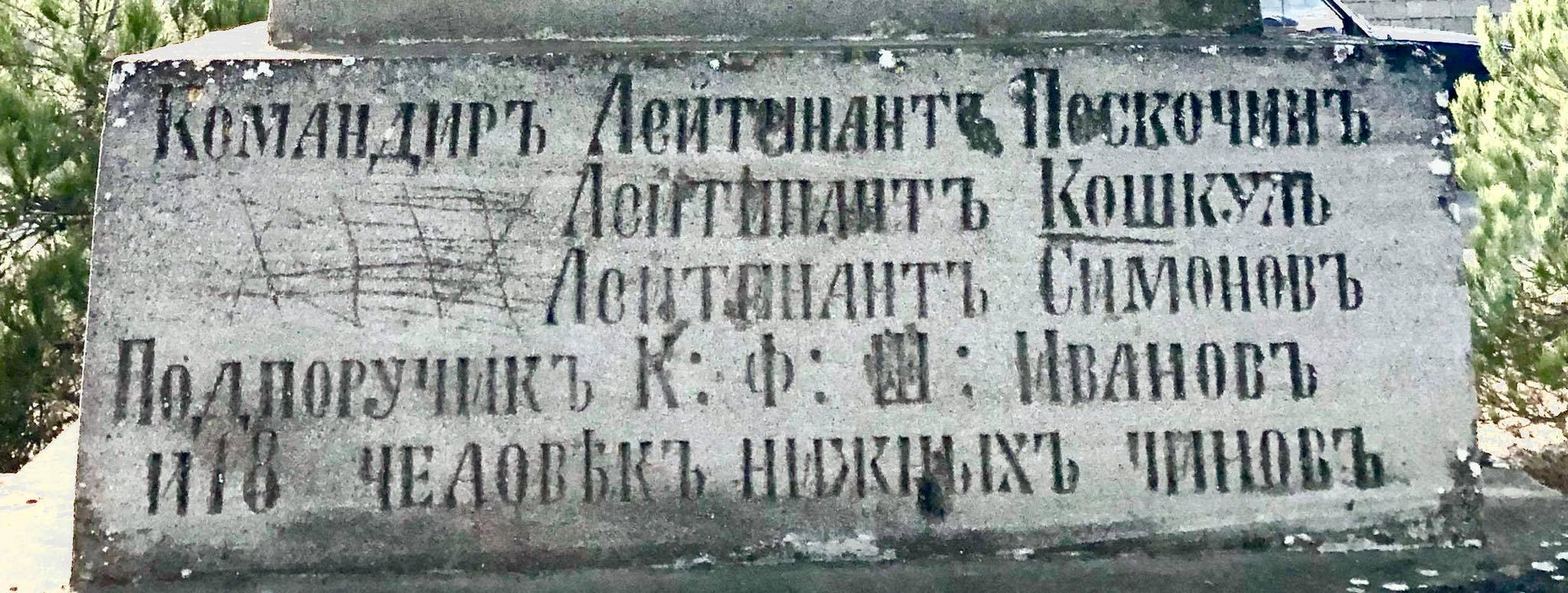

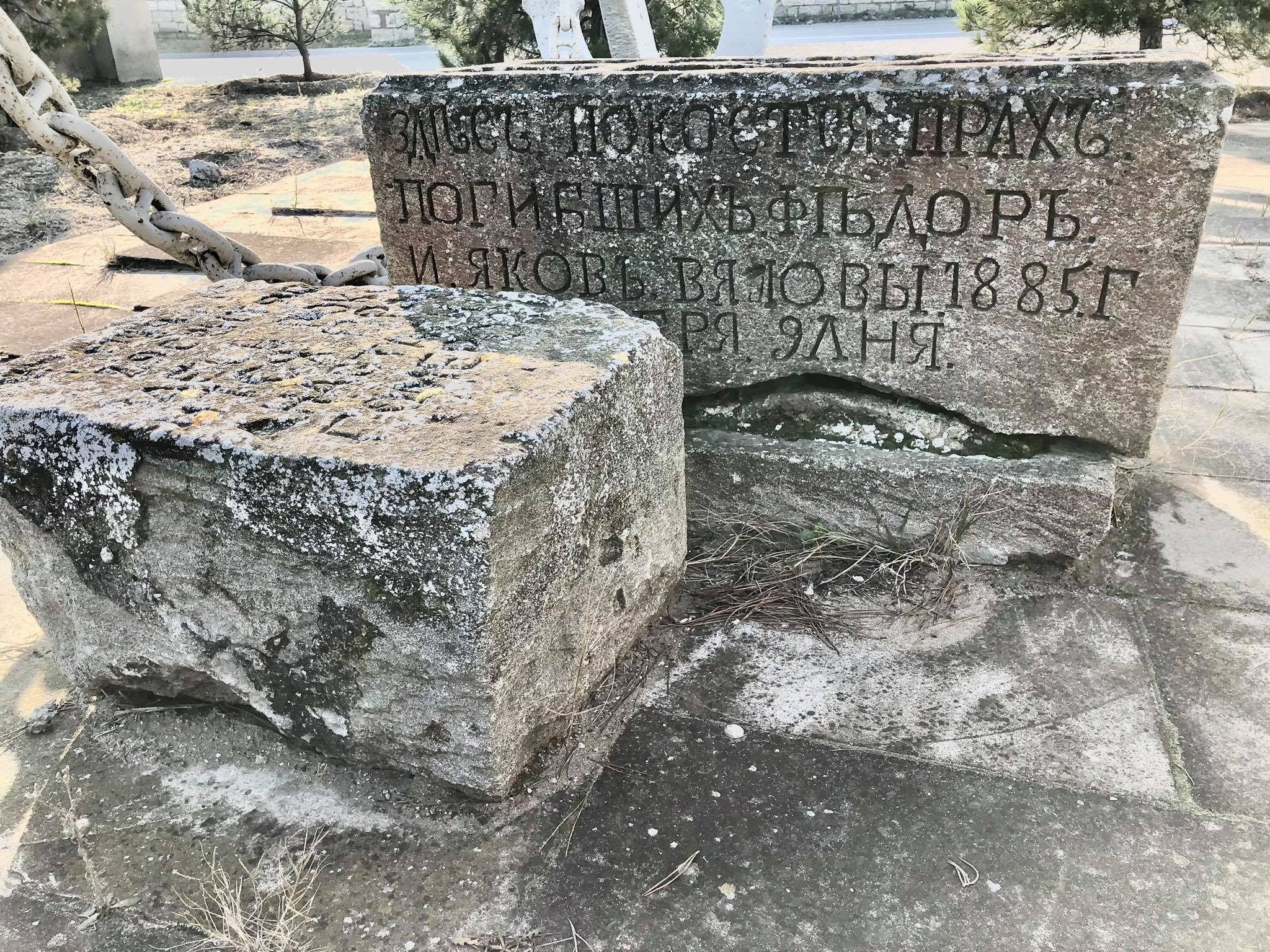

== See also ==
- Mitrofanov Residence
- Mikado Cinematography Building
- The building of the Union of Composers of Azerbaijan
