= Gürgan =

- Location within Azerbaijan
- Coordinates: 40°24′06″N 50°19′46″E
- Country: Azerbaijan
- City: Baku
- Raion: Əzizbəyov
- Municipality: Gürgən-Pirallahı

Population (2008)
  - Total: 726
- Time zone: UTC+4 (AZT)
  - Summer (DST): UTC+5 (AZT)
- Absheron Lighthouse; Abşeron
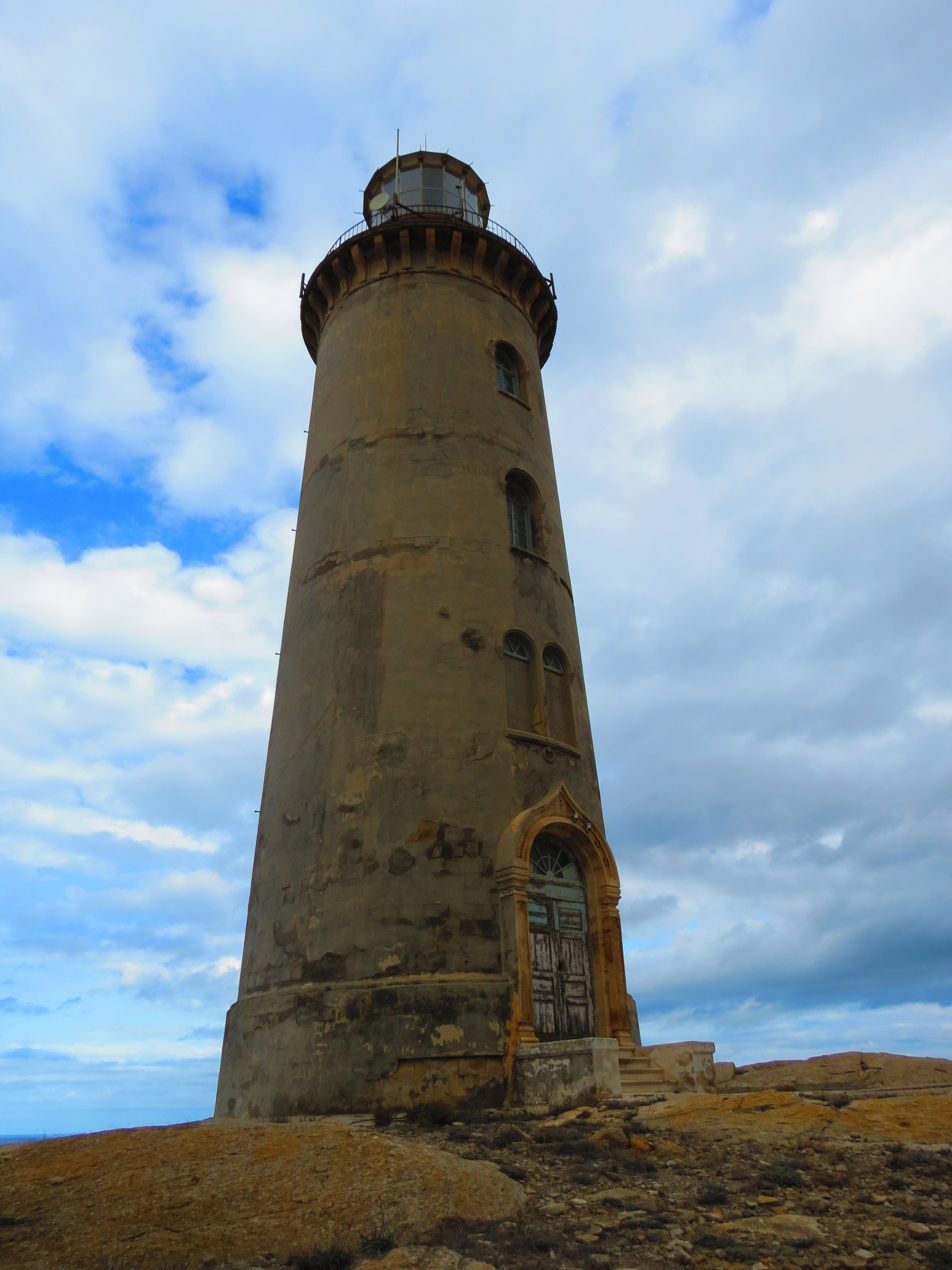
- Absheron Lighthouse pictured on the stamp
- Constructed: 1860
- Foundation: masonry base
- Construction: masonry tower
- Height: 25 m (82 ft)
- Shape: cylindrical tower with balcony and lantern
- Markings: unpainted tower
- Focal height: 101 m (331 ft)
- Characteristic: Oc W 6s

Gürgan (also, Gürgən and Gyurgyan) is a village in Baku, Azerbaijan. It forms part of the municipality of Gürgən-Pirallahı.

== See also ==
- List of lighthouses in Azerbaijan
