= Boyuk Zira Lighthouse =

Lighthouse in Azerbaijan

Boyuk Zira lighthouse
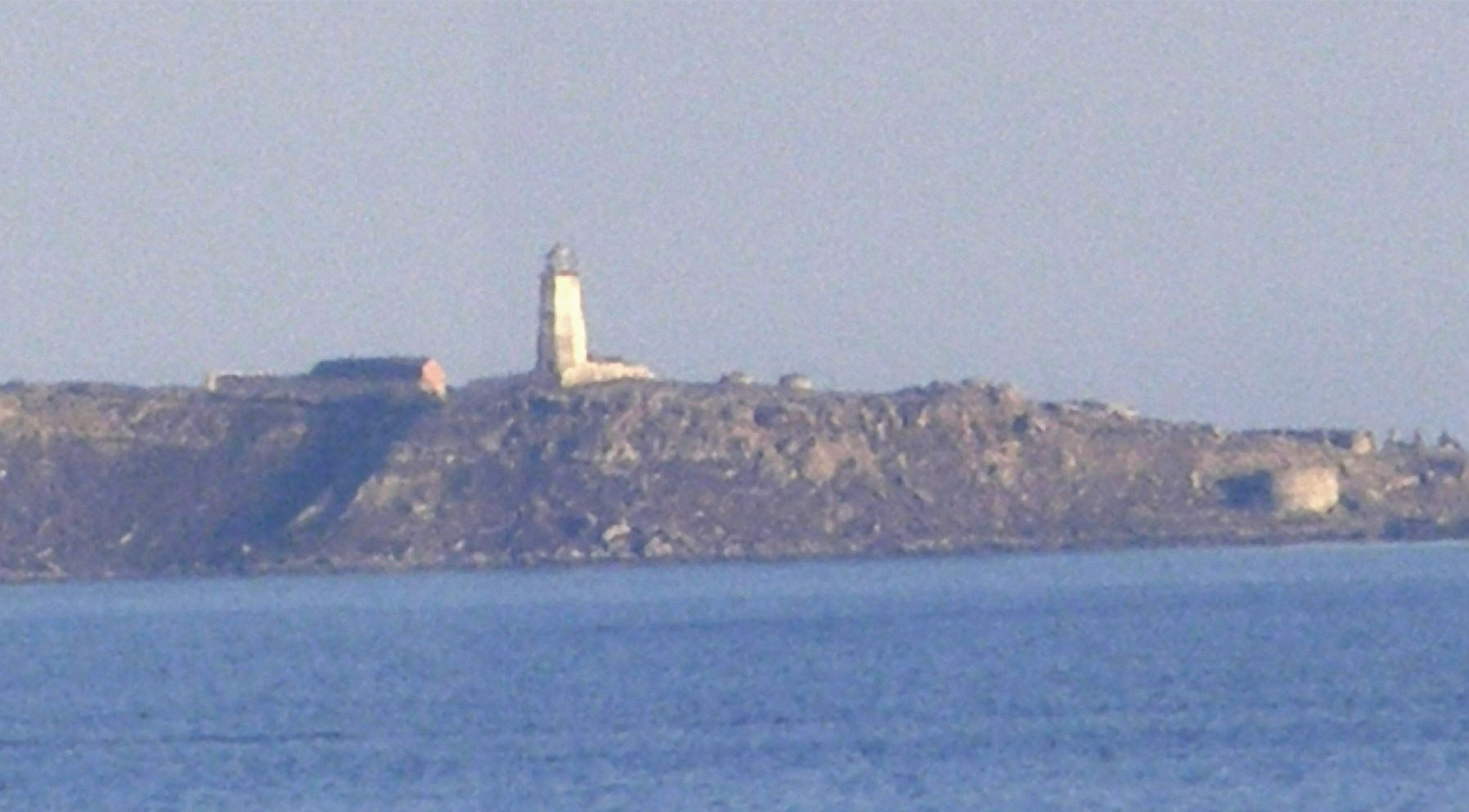
- Location: Boyuk Zira; Baku; Azerbaijan
- Coordinates: 40°17′44.4″N 49°55′21.9″E

Tower
- Constructed: 1884 (first)
- Height: 18 metres (59 ft)
- Shape: octagonal tower with balcony and lantern
- Markings: white tower, red lantern

Light
- First lit: 1858 (current)
- Focal height: 42 metres (138 ft)
- Range: 20 nautical miles (37 km; 23 mi)
- Characteristic: FI W (3) 9s.

Boyuk Zira Lighthouse (Azerbaijani: Böyük Zirə mayakı) is a lighthouse in the north of Boyuk Zira Island, in the Caspian Sea, Azerbaijan.

== History ==
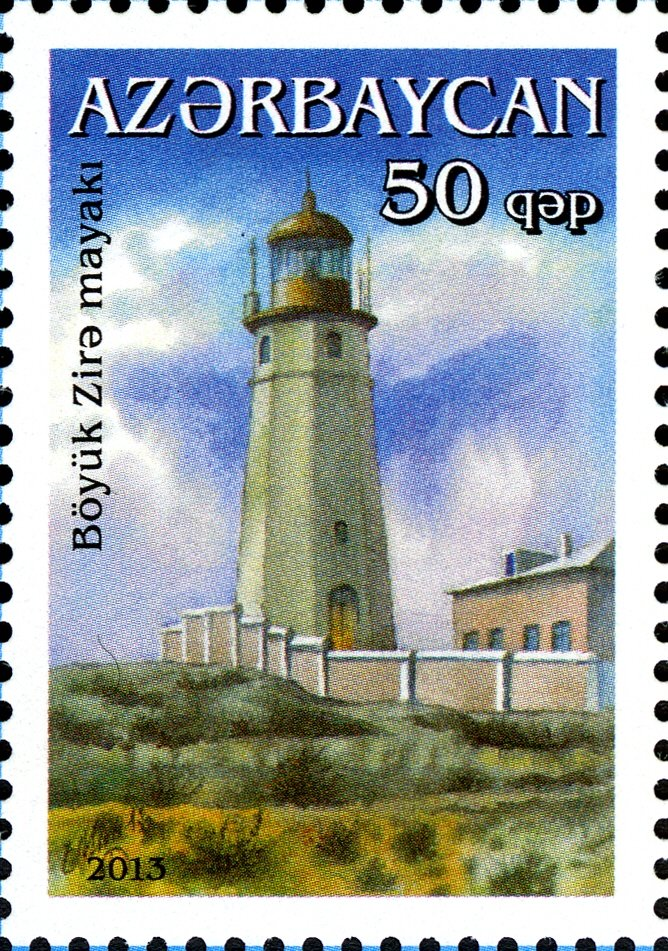
Boyuk Zira Lighthouse on stamp of Azerbaijan, 2013

The lighthouse in the island was begun to function since 1884. It illuminated road for ships entering Bay of Baku. Until 1907, Maiden Tower executed these functions. But later, Nargin Island detaching Baku Bay from the sea, became the main guide for sailors. A kerosene-wick burner, and then a gas lantern with a light-optic apparatus of the 4th degree illuminated a road for ships. The Nargin lighthouse illuminated by acetylene in 1912, became the first lighthouse in the Russian Empire illuminated by such a way.

In the beginning of the Great Patriotic War, Nargin lighthouse was exploded for not to attract attention of German aviation, and fixed antiaircraft guns in the island. In 1958, Nargin lighthouse was restored and acts up to now.

== See also ==
- List of lighthouses in Azerbaijan
