= Shuvalan =

Şüvəlan
- Municipality
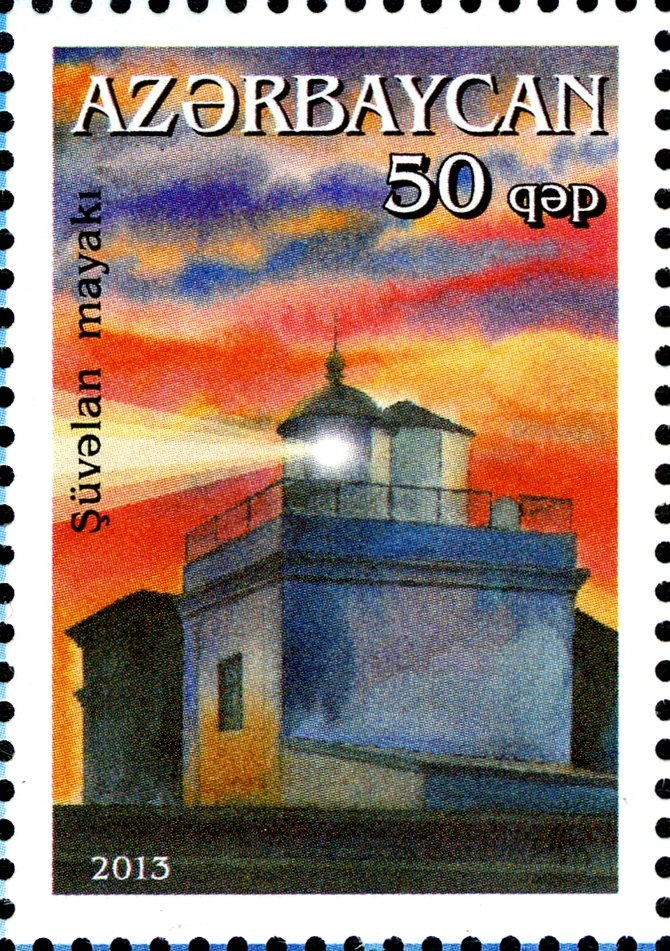
- Shuvalan lighthouse

- Location within Azerbaijan
- Coordinates: 40°29′20″N 50°12′25″E
- Country: Azerbaijan
- City: Baku
- District: Xəzər-Khazar

Population
  - Total: 28,500
- Time zone: UTC+4 (AZT)
  - Summer (DST): UTC+5 (AZT)

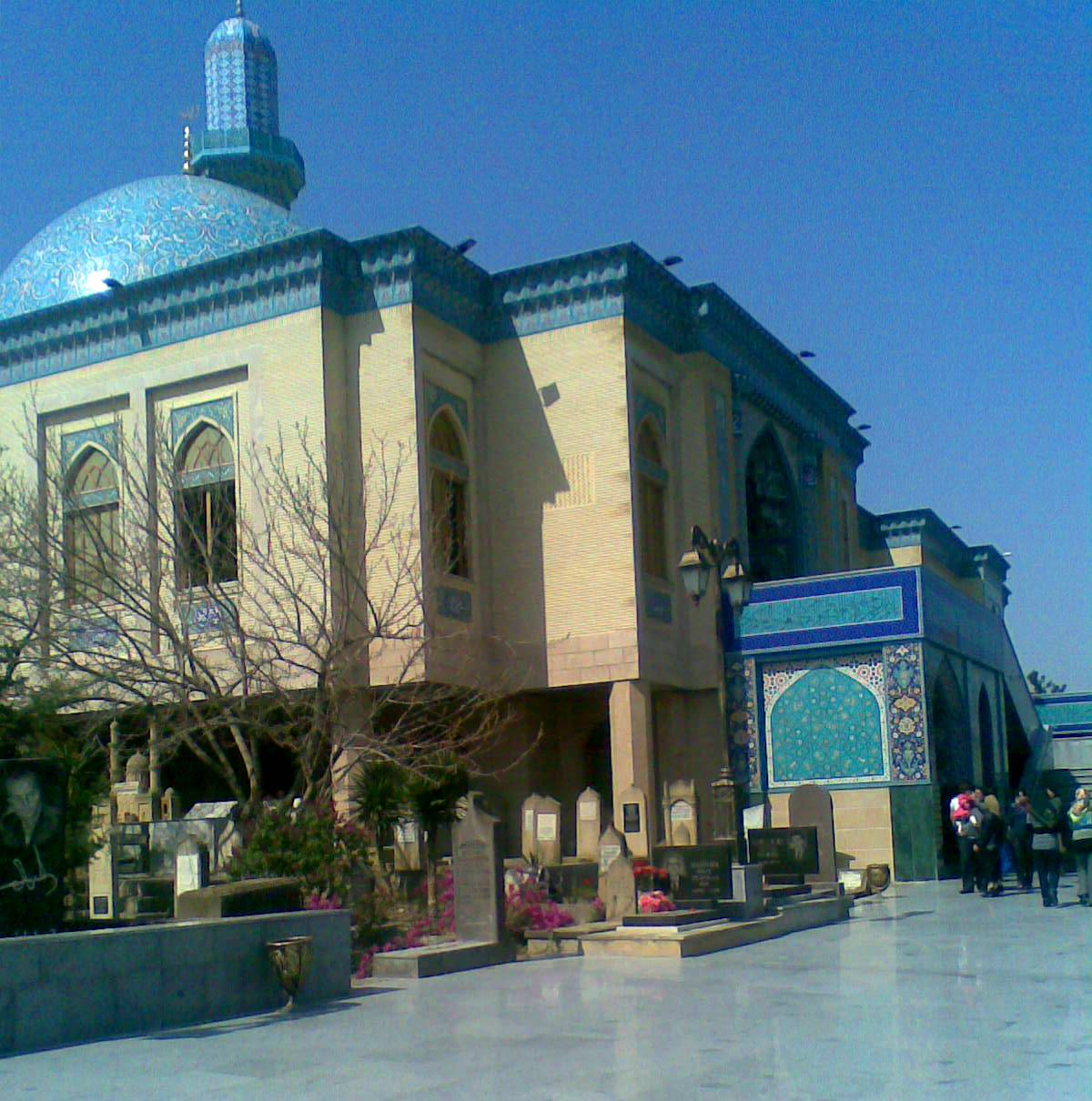
Tomb of Mir Movsum Agha in Shuvelan

Şüvəlan is a settlement and municipality in Baku, Azerbaijan. It has a population of 14,992. The population origin comes mostly from a settlement of Qala, Azerbaijan.

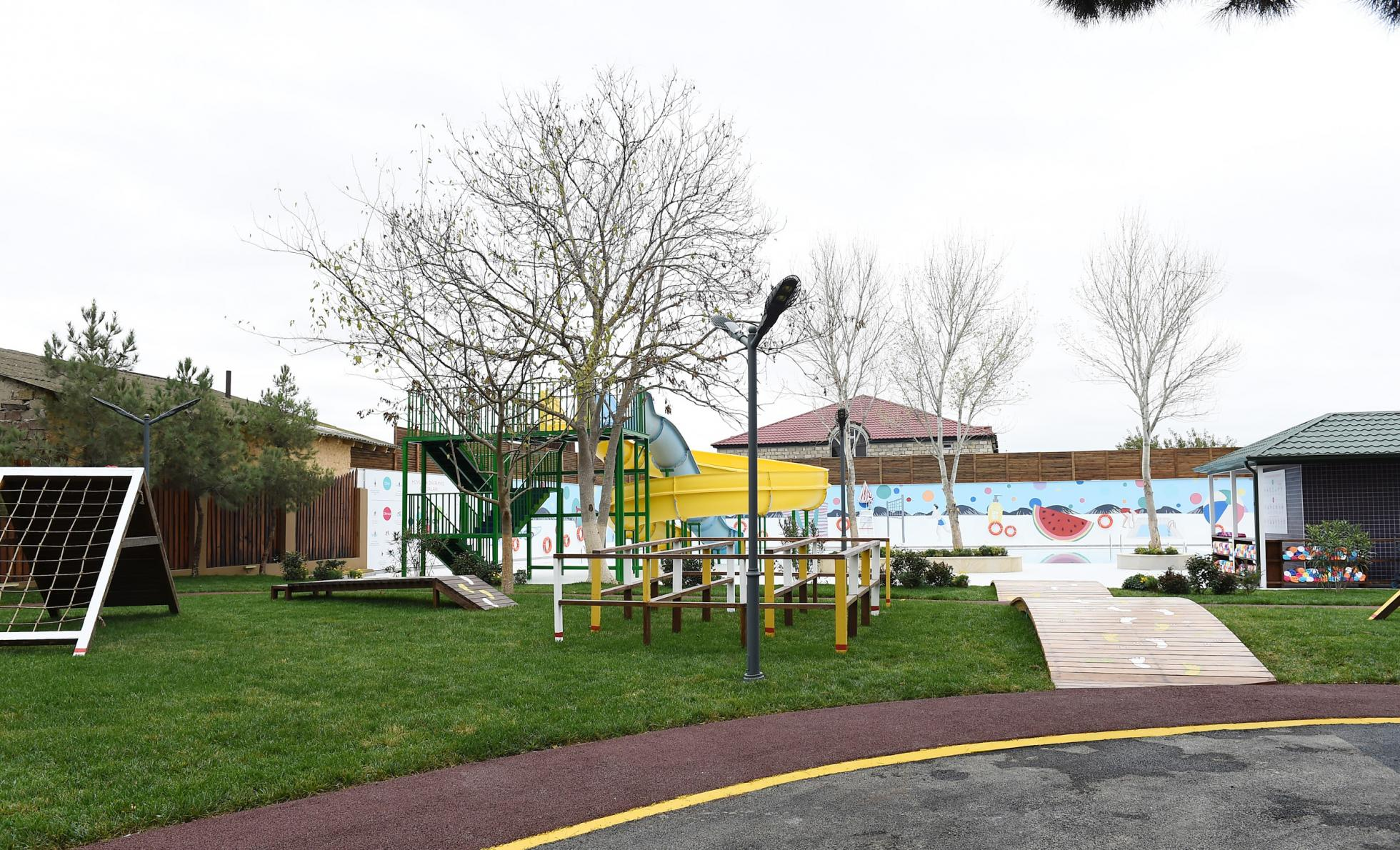
“Jirtdan” Recreation and Wellness Center

== History ==
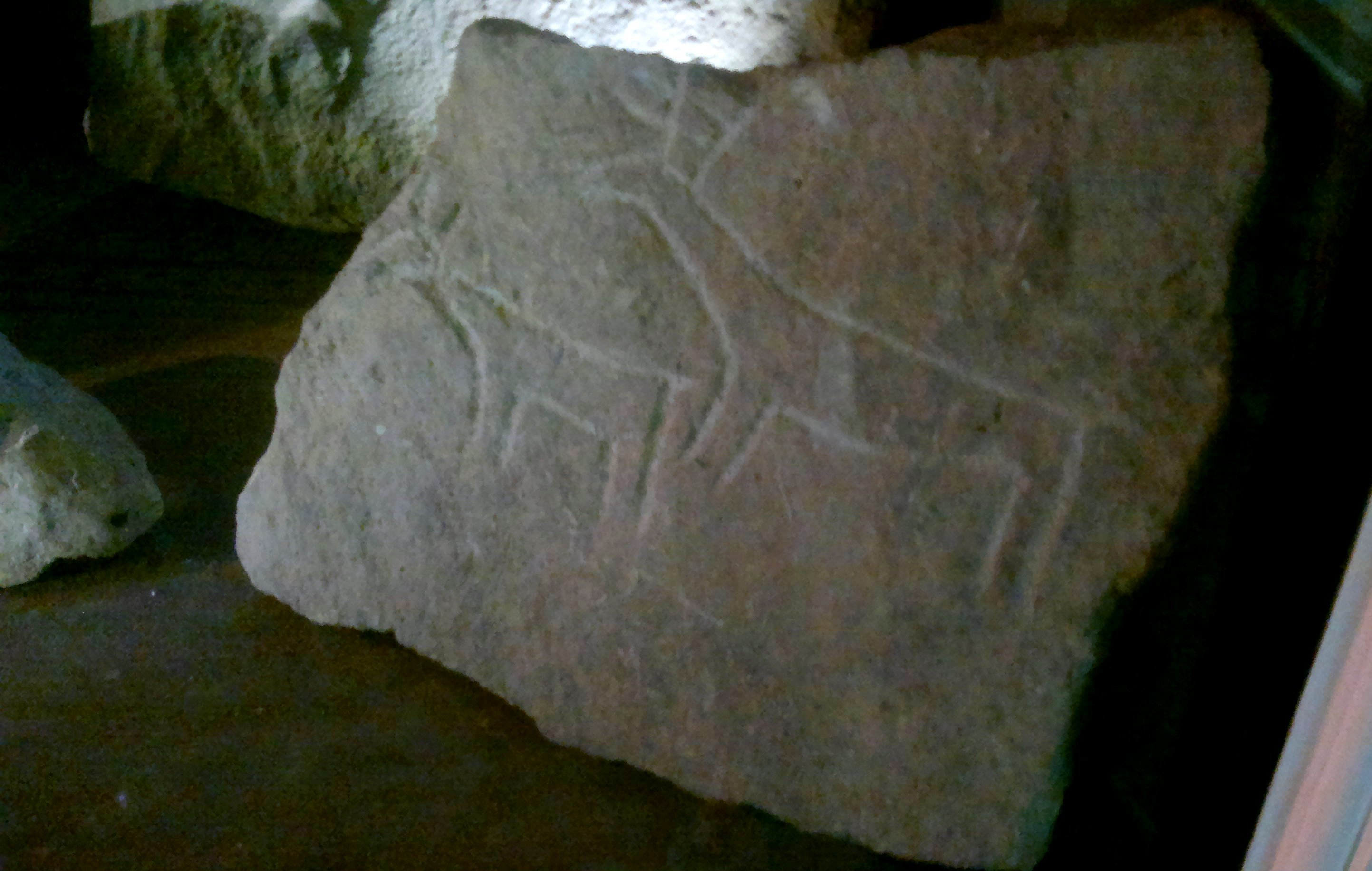
Petroglyphs from Shuvalan. Bronze and Early Iron Ages. Museum of History of Azerbaijan, Baku

According to the old generation, an ancient times people in Qala, used Shuvalan as pasture for the animals: sheep, cows and horses. Then later on they moved to Shuvalan because the vegetation potential and due to cold weather in winter times in Qala.

== Modern structures ==
- Shuvelan Park, one of the shopping malls in Azerbaijan.
- Shuvelan Rehab Center.

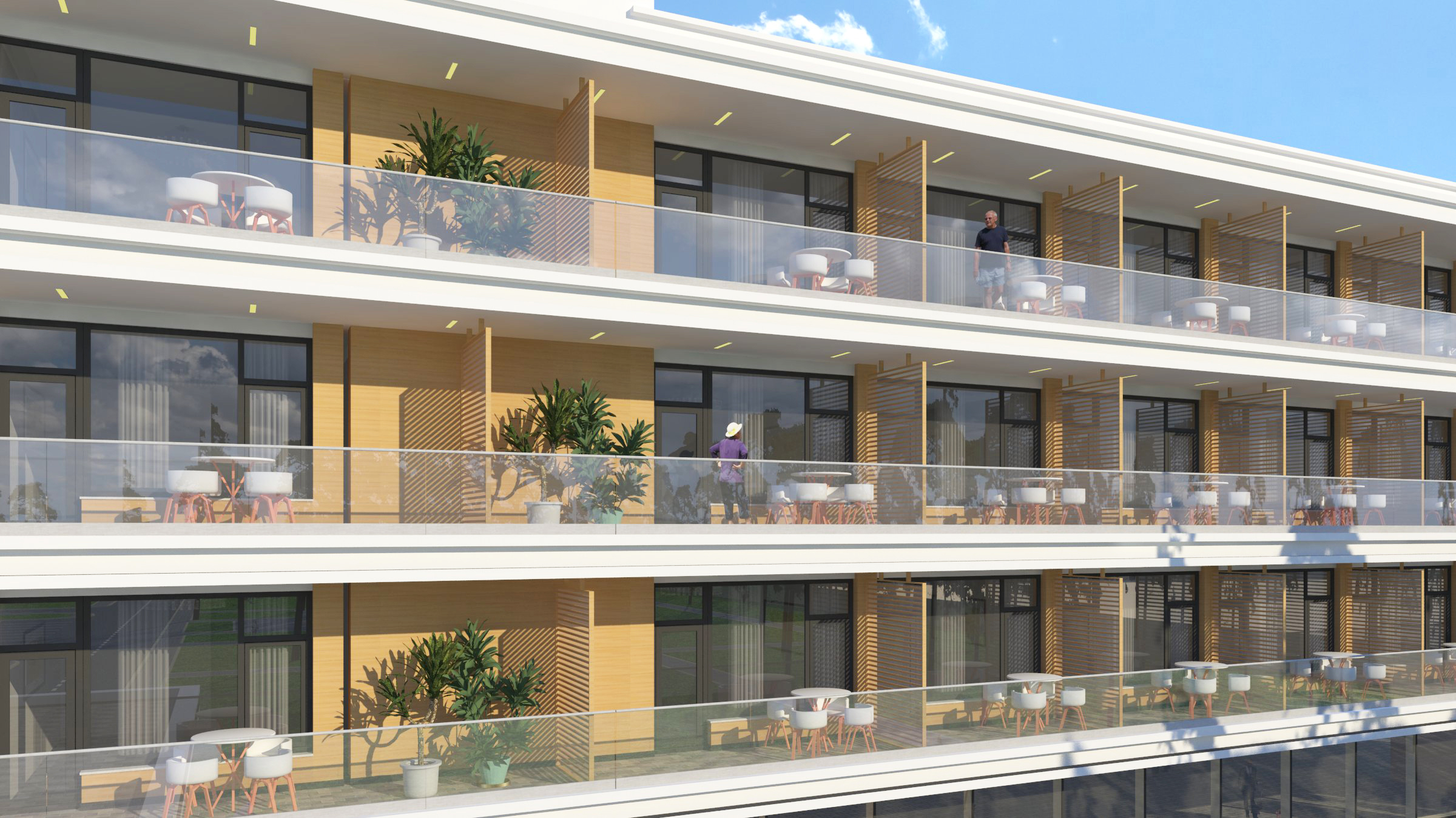
Shuvelan Rehab Center (approved project)

== Notable natives ==
- Almas Ildyrym - Azerbaijani Poet, after the Bolsheviks established their power in Azerbaijan in 1920, the fact that Ildyrym had been born into a wealthy merchant family plagued him for the rest of his life.

Almas Ildyrym

- Ruhulla Akhundov — First Secretary of the Communist Party of Azerbaijan SSR (1925–1926), People's Commissar of Education of Azerbaijan SSR.
- Ashraf Ashrafzade - Azerbaijani Musician (Clarinetist)
- Fikrat Ashrafzade - Azerbaijani Musician (Clarinetist)

== See also ==
- Qala, Azerbaijan
- Shuvalan FK
