= Old City Museum Center =

Museum in Azerbaijan

- Azerbaijani: İçərişəhər Muzey Mərkəzi
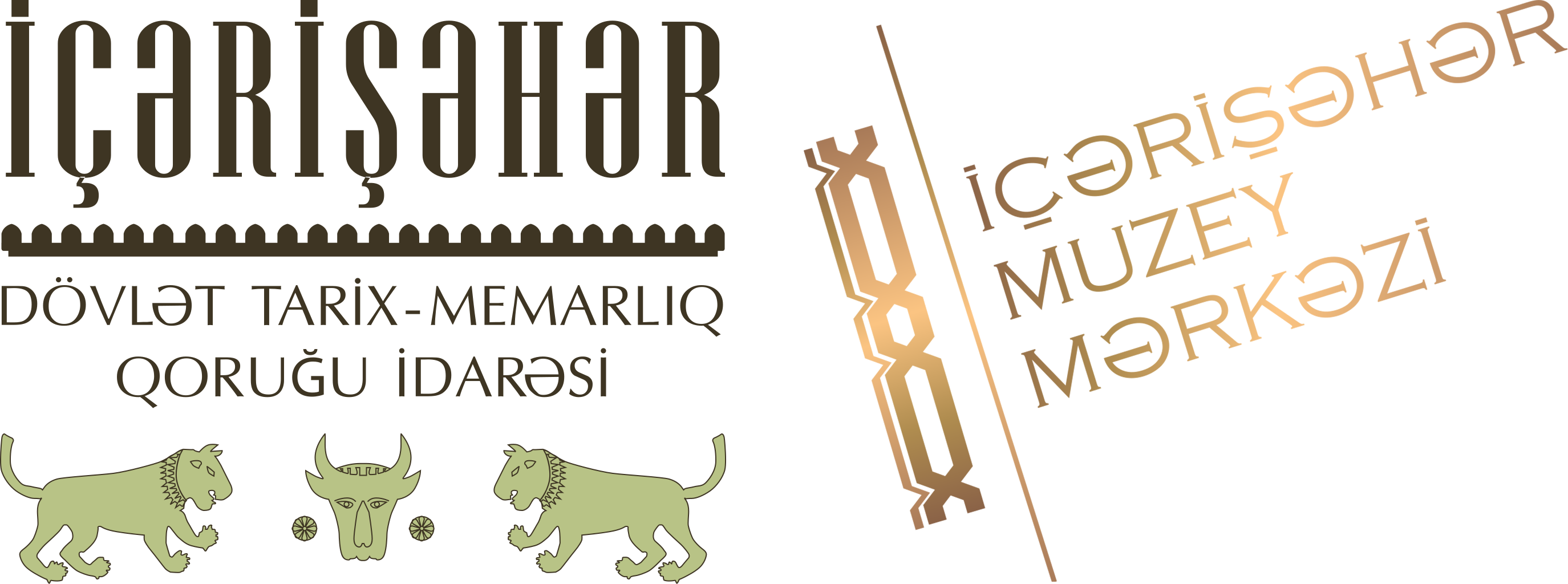

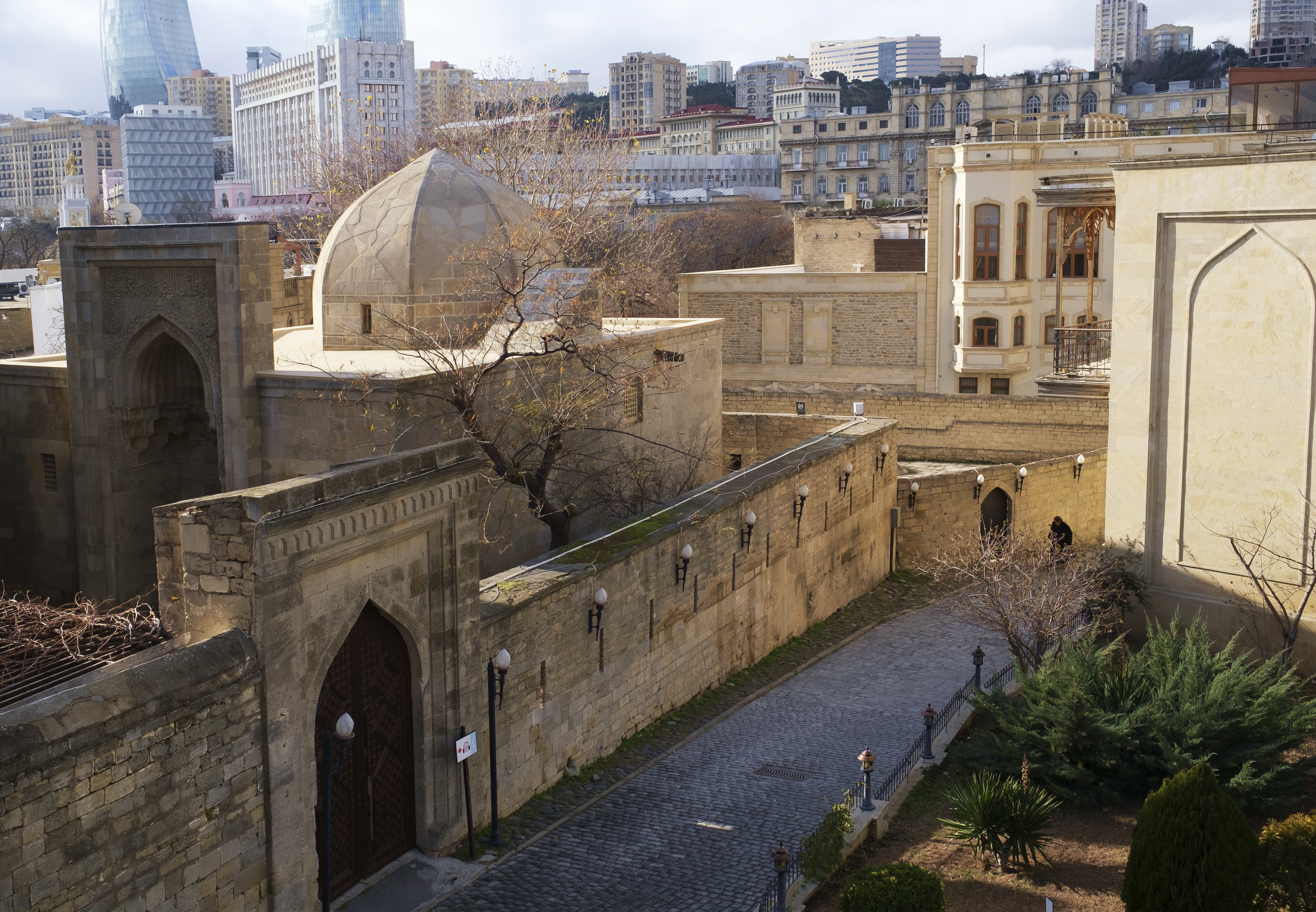

- Location within Azerbaijan
- Established: 22 December 2018
- Location: Boyuk Gala street 41, Old City; Baku, Azerbaijan
- Coordinates: 40°22′N 49°50′E
- Visitors: 341 728 (2019)
- Website: www.icherisheher.gov.az

Old City Museum Center or Icherisheher Museum Center (Azerbaijani: İçərişəhər Muzey Mərkəzi) is a museum in Azerbaijan. The Museum Center is a part of the State Department of the Historical and Architectural Reserve of Old City. The museum explores the architecture, life and culture of the ancient Shirvanshahs' Palace, Maiden Tower, ancient mosques, baths (Beyler Mosque, Siratagly religious-architectural complex), Baku Khans' Palace, and the Gala village. The Center collects, preserves and propagates material about the cultural monuments of the period, and holds international conferences, symposiums, themed parties, theatrical museum events at the Monuments Complex.

The fund of the Old City Museum Center includes photo negatives, applied arts, numismatics, rare books, documents, photos, graphics and archeology examples.

== About the museum ==
Old City Museum Center was created by the Decree of the Cabinet of Ministers of the Republic of Azerbaijan No. 558, dated December 22, 2018. The museum is based on "Shirvanshahs Palace Complex" State Historical-Architectural Reserve Museum, Icheri Sheher History Museum, and Gala State Historical Ethnographic Reserve, which are part of the Administration of Old City State Historical and Architectural Reserve.

The Old City Museum Center holds permanent and mobile exhibitions, presentations using modern technology and equipment.

== Affiliated entities ==
- Monuments included in the Palace of the Shirvanshahs Complex
  - Shirvanshahs' residence (XII-XV centuries)
  - Divankhana/Shah Mausoleum (XV century)
  - Mausoleum of Seyid Yahya Bakuvi (XV century)
  - Keygubad Mosque (XIV century)
  - Eastern Portal (Murad Gate) (1585-1586)
  - Shirvanshah's Palace Mausoleum
  - Shah mosque (1441-1442)
  - Bath (XV century)
- Maiden Tower (XII century)
- Beyler Mosque (1895)
- Siratagly religious-architectural complex (XII century)
- Baku Khans' Palace (XVIII century)
- Gala State Historical Ethnographic Reserve
- Baku Photography House
- Art Tower (XII century)

== Gallery ==
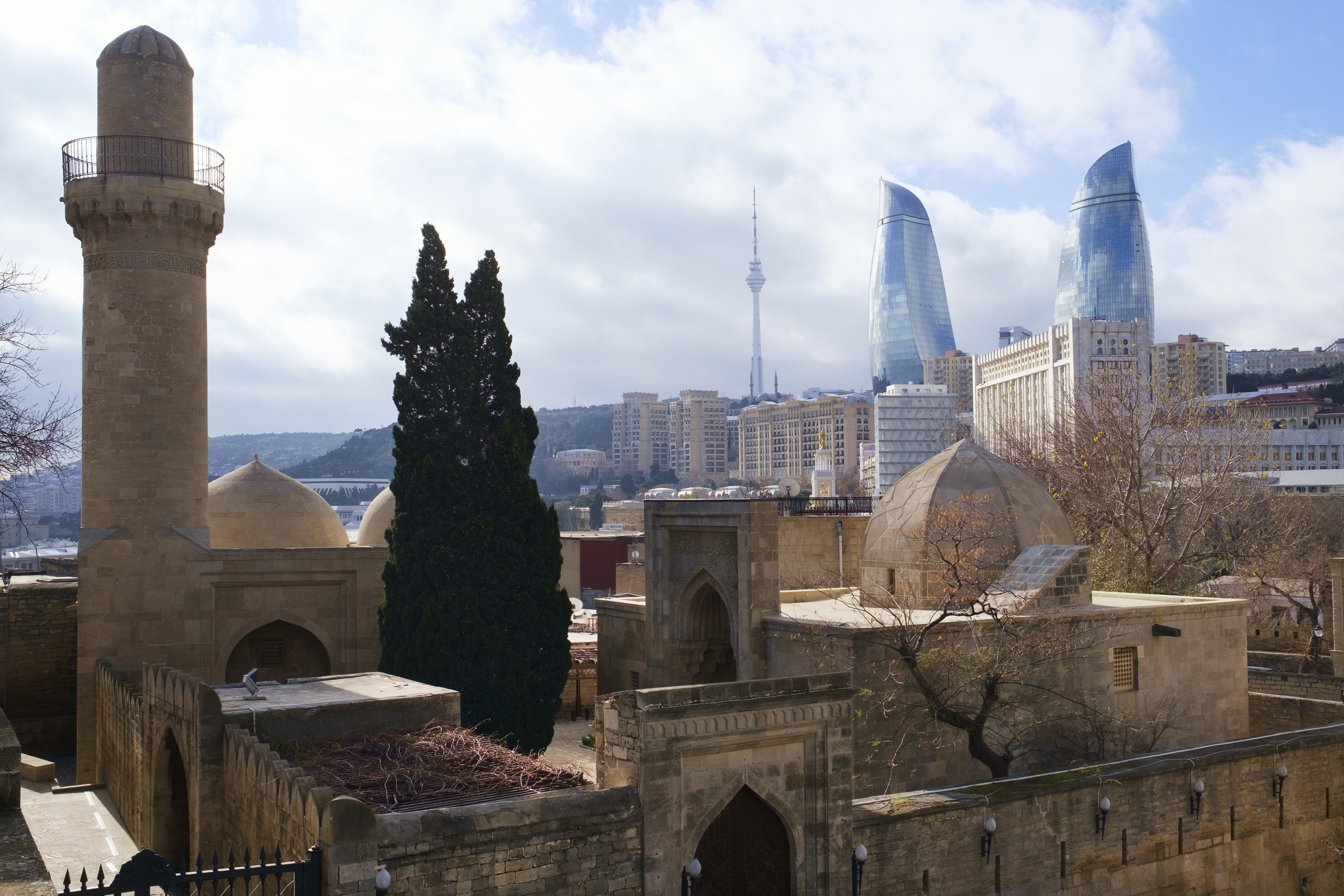
Palace of the Shirvanshahs

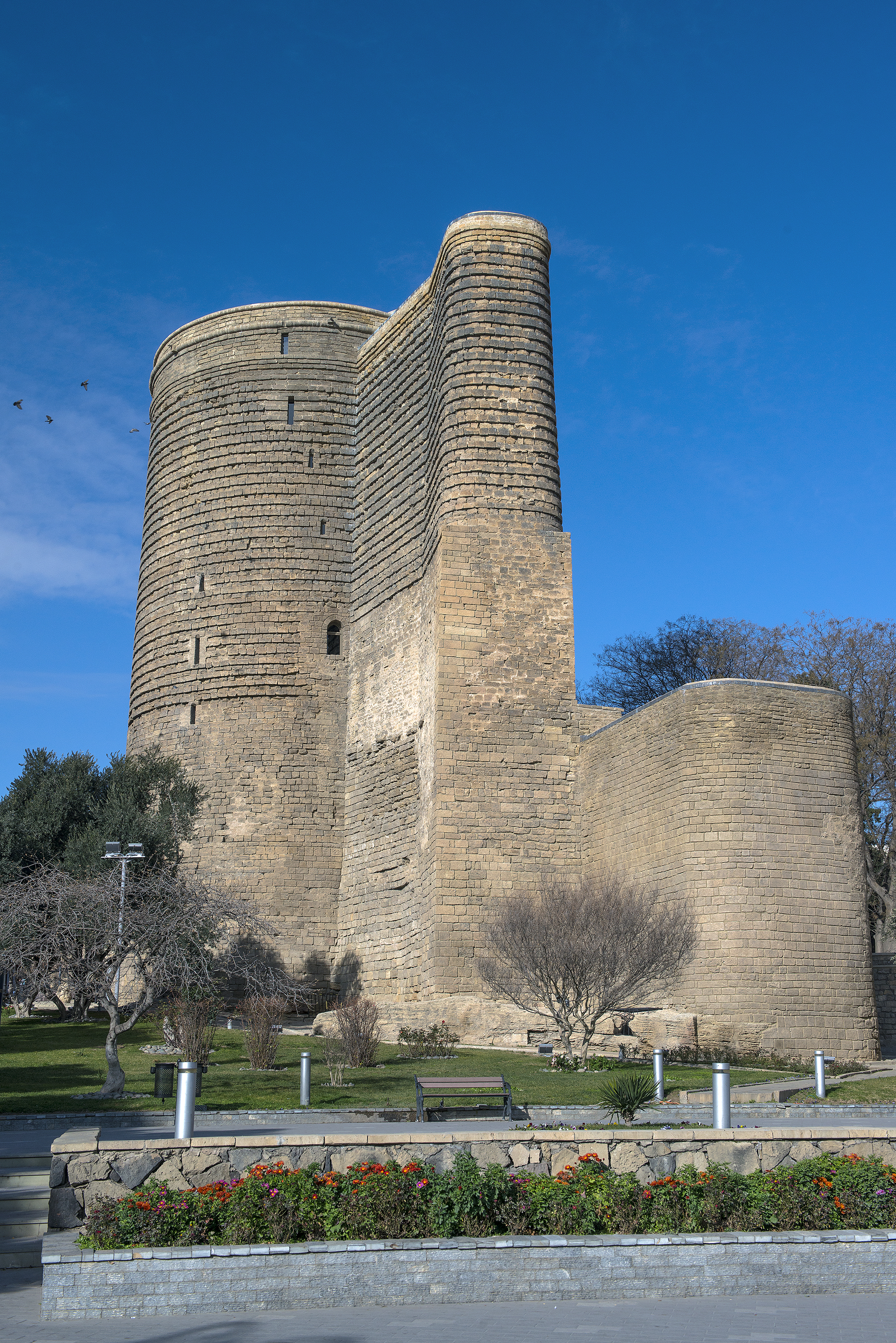
Maiden Tower

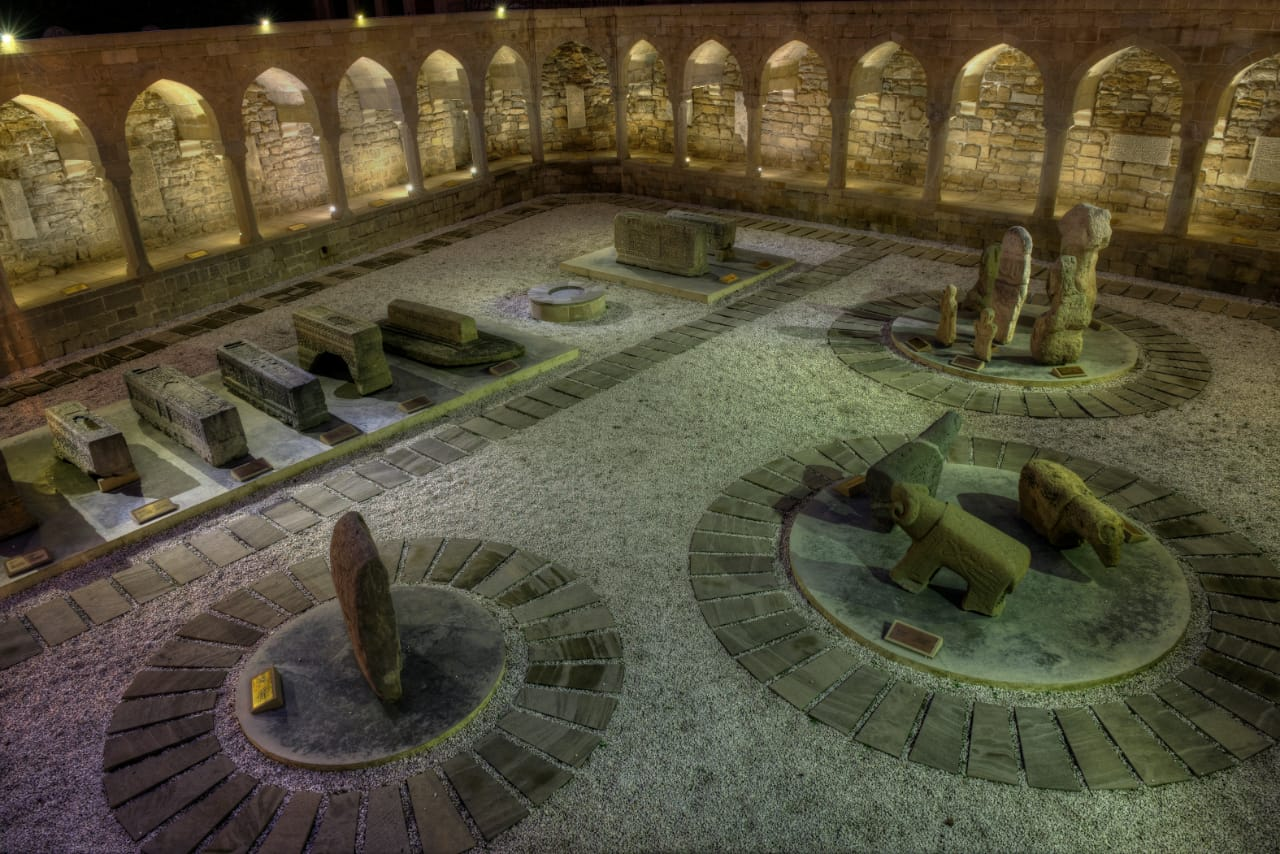
Siratagly religious-architectural complex

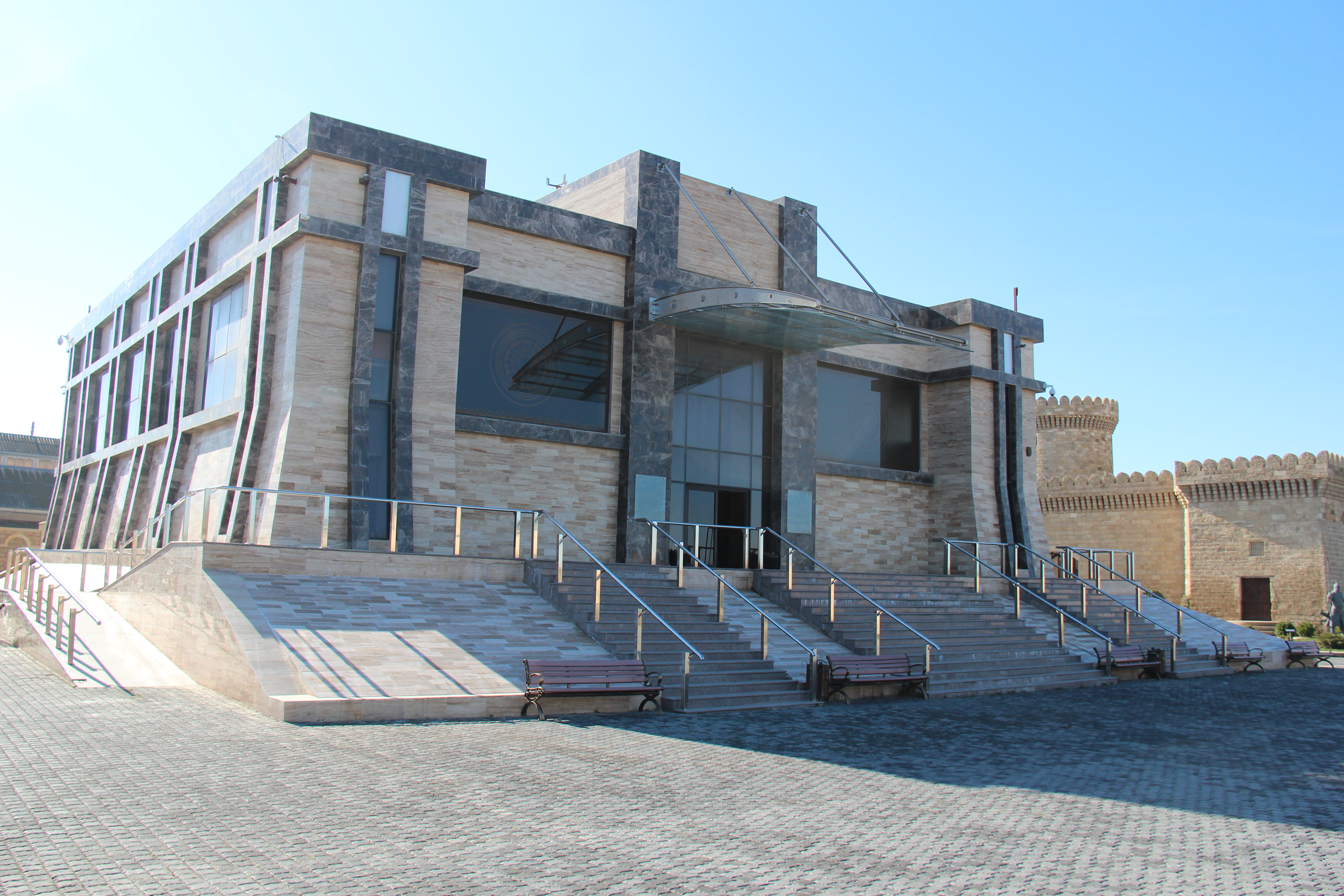
Gala Museum of Antique Items
