= Bazar Square (Old City) =

Bazar square
- Azerbaijani: Bazar meydanı
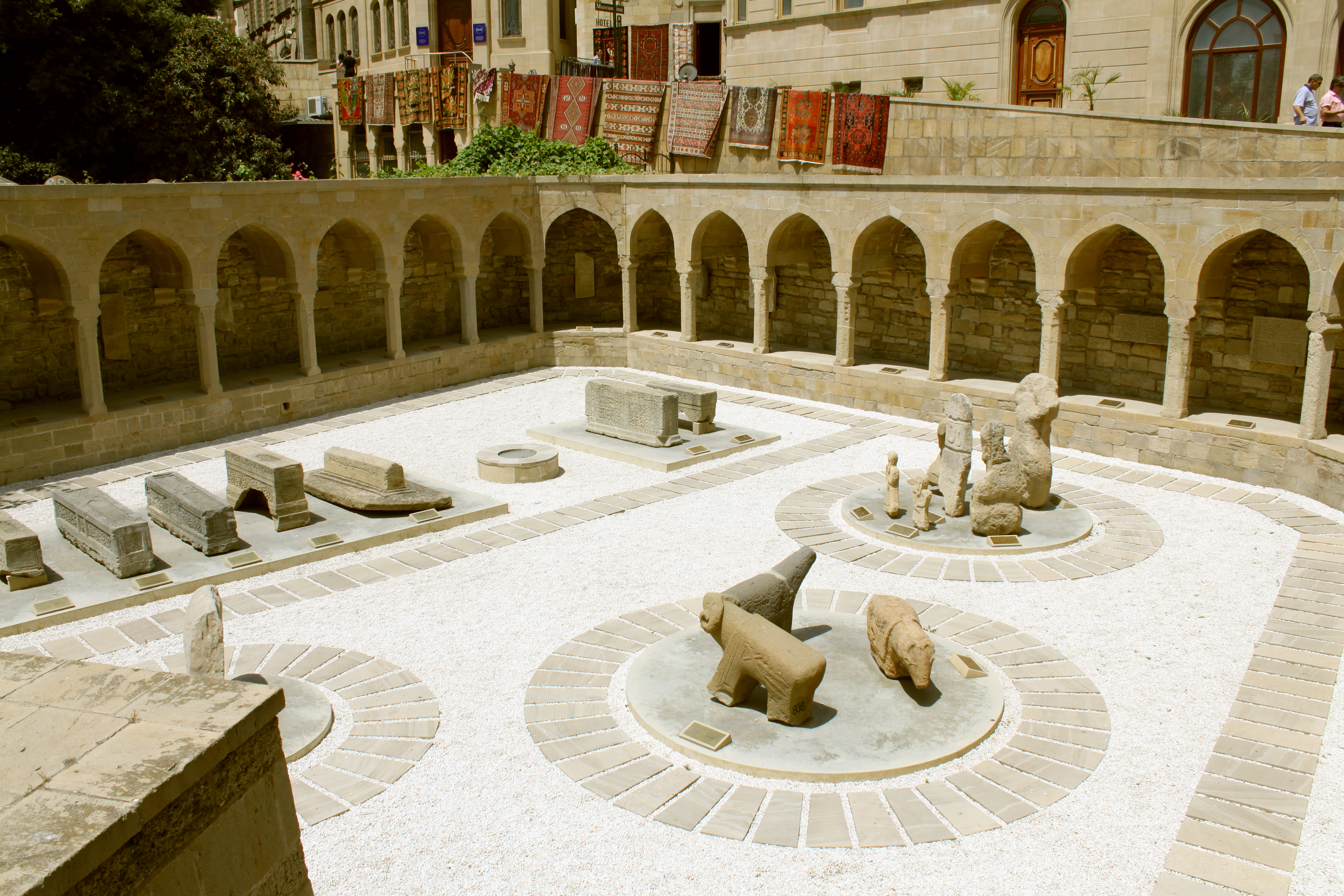

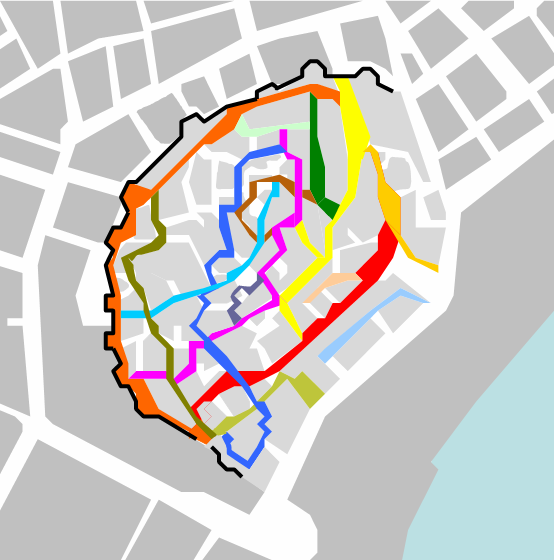
- Location within Streets in Old City, Baku, Azerbaijan
- Alternative names: Khanqah complex, Pagan temple

General information
- Architectural style: Architectural school of Shirvan-Absheron
- Location: Kichik Gala Street, 28, Old City, Baku, Azerbaijan
- Coordinates: 40°21′59″N 49°50′12″E
- Completed: 12th-13th centuries

Bazar square (Azerbaijani: Bazar meydanı) or Khanagah complex (Azerbaijani: Xanəgah kompleksi) is a historic religious-architectural complex with arcade of the 12-13th centuries. It is a part of Old City and located on Kichik Gala street, in the city of Baku, in Azerbaijan. It was also registered as a national architectural monument by the decision of the Cabinet of Ministers of the Republic of Azerbaijan dated August 2, 2001, No. 132.

The complex was discovered during archeological excavations carried out in 1964 on the northern side of the Maiden Tower.

== Structure ==
The structure of the monument is similar to Al-Masjid Al-Ḥarām for its coverage with pavement and arcades. 52 graves were discovered in the area as a result of the archaeological excavations. Most of the graves are specially preserved. Graves in the territory of the monument and under the arches are believed to be belonging to those deceased persons. According to Islamic traditions, some people bequeathed to be buried in sacred places. When the sacred place was too far away, the person was buried in nearby places. The found cultural monuments and graves reflects opinions of the archaeologist, which means the place was once a pilgrimage.

In the middle of the yard, near the graves, a cylindrical well and at a certain distance, on south-eastern side, a large eight-pointed column were discovered. The column stands on a three-tiered pavement, which was built of stone. Its height is 1.31 meters and thickness is 48 cm.

== Gallery ==
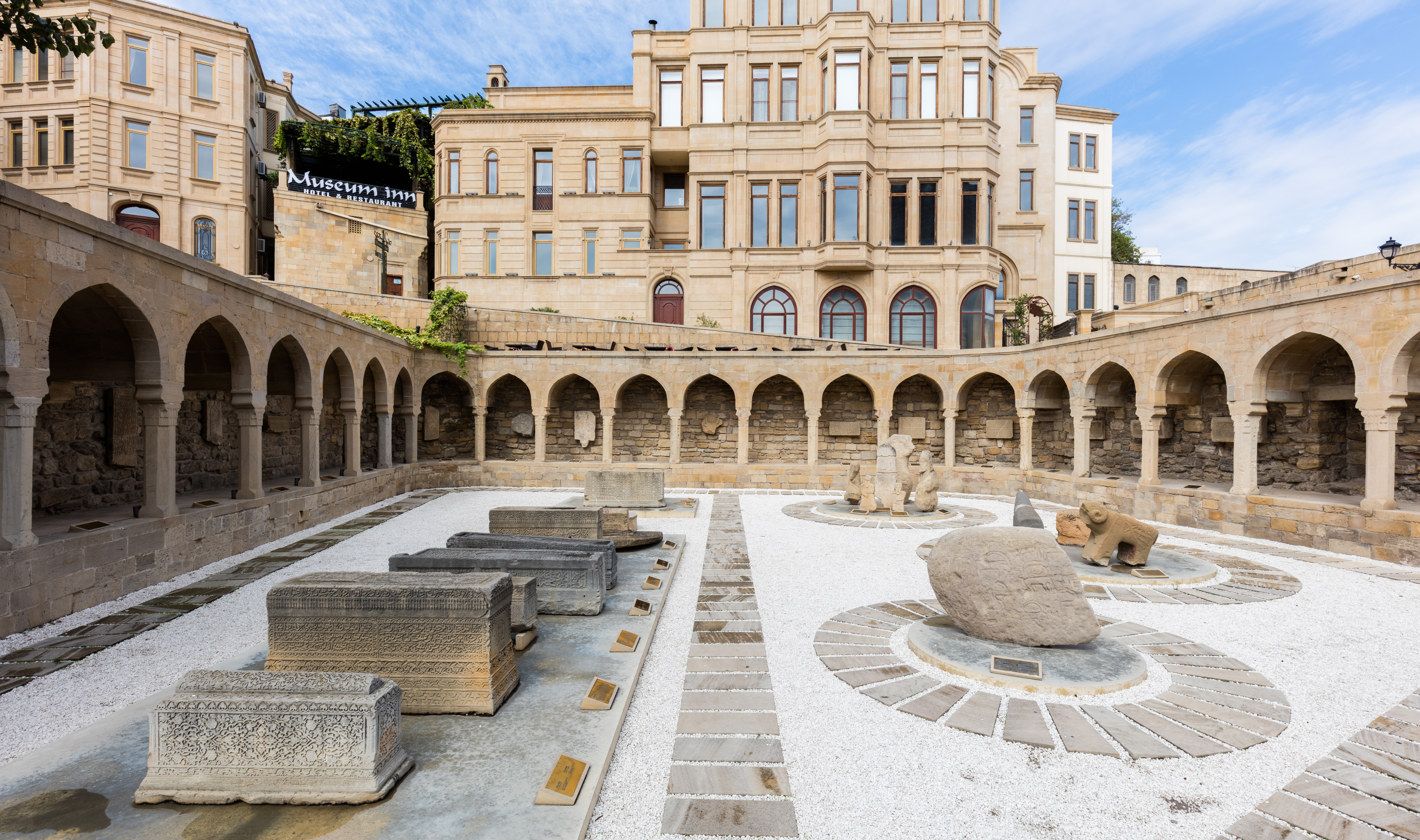

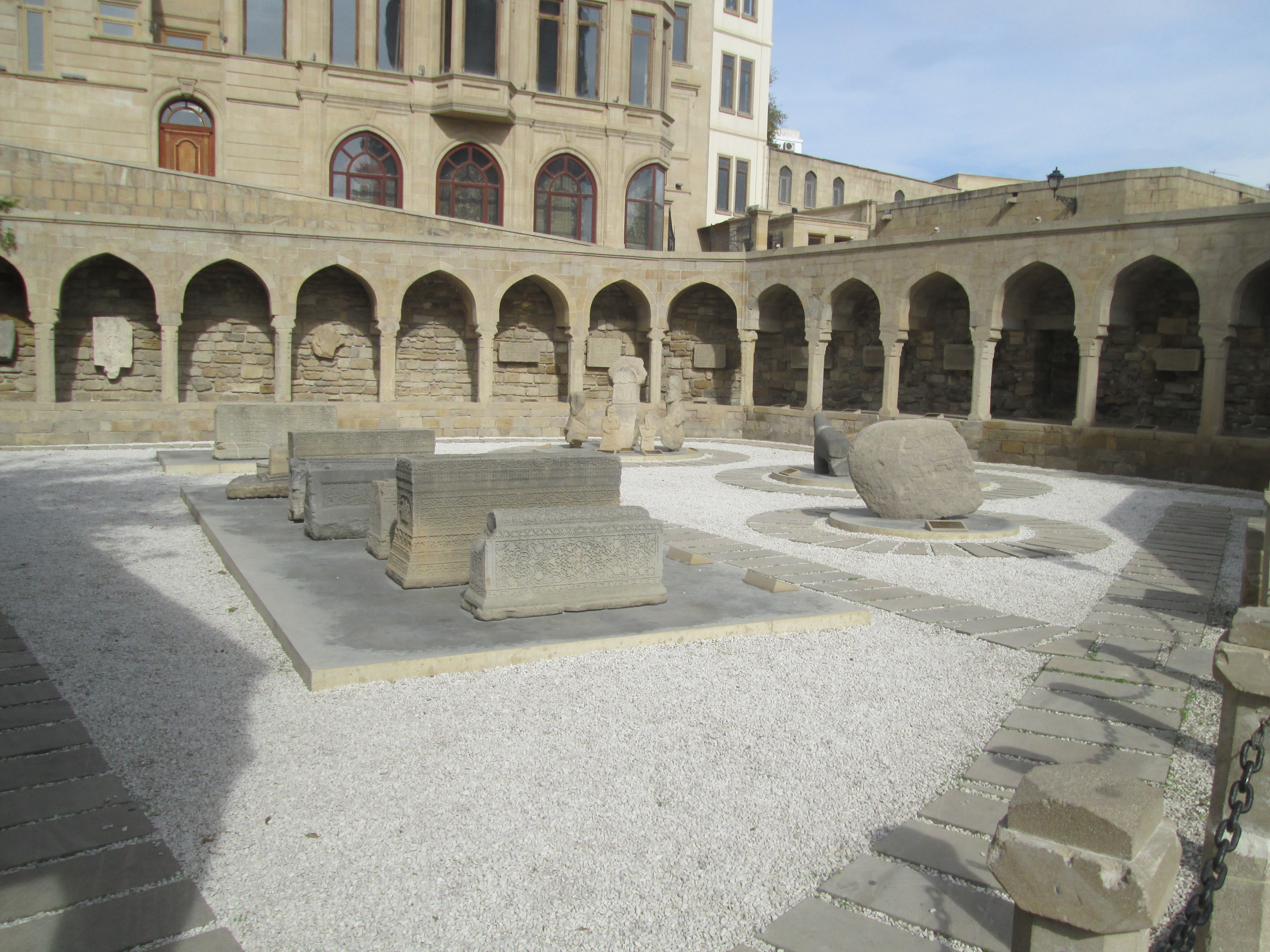

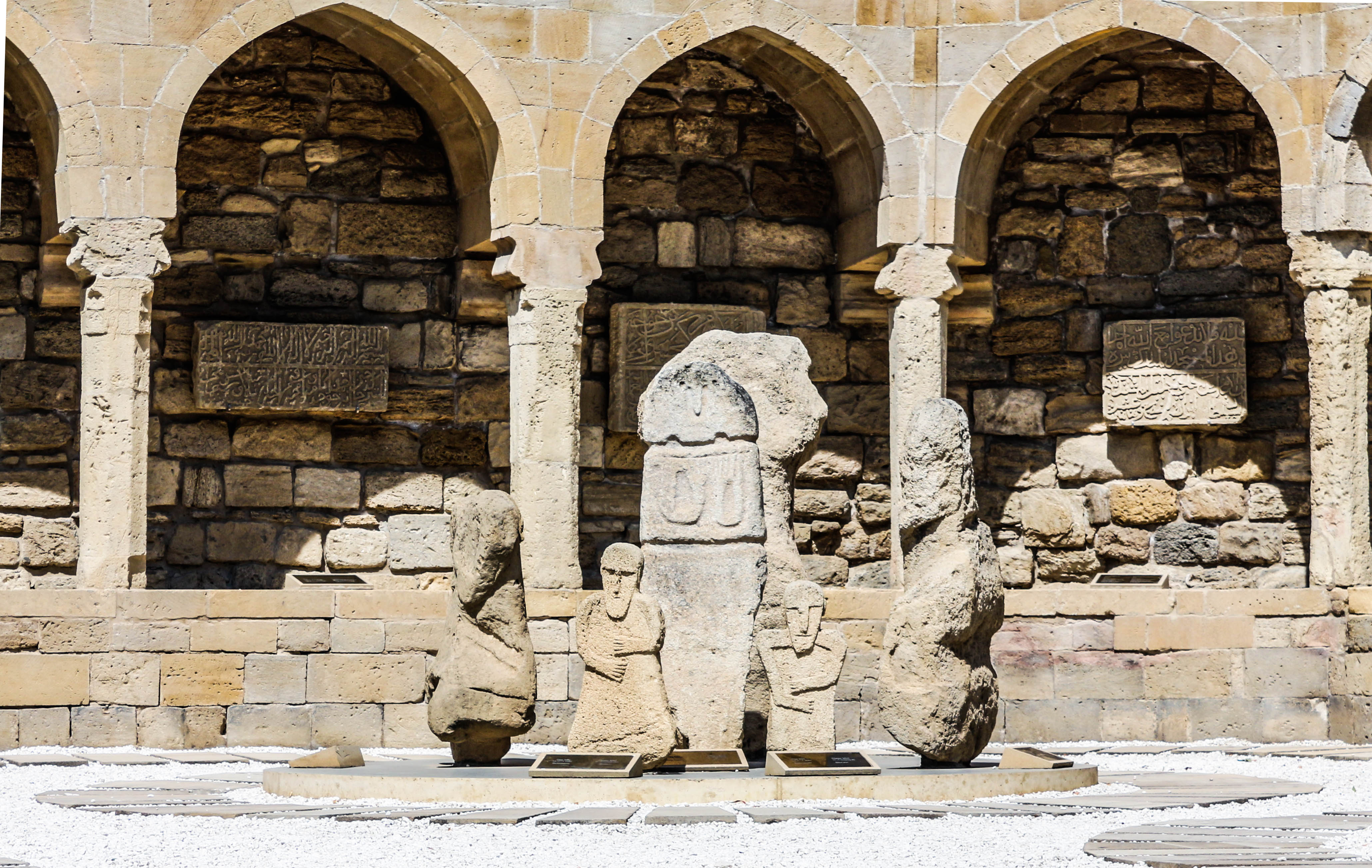

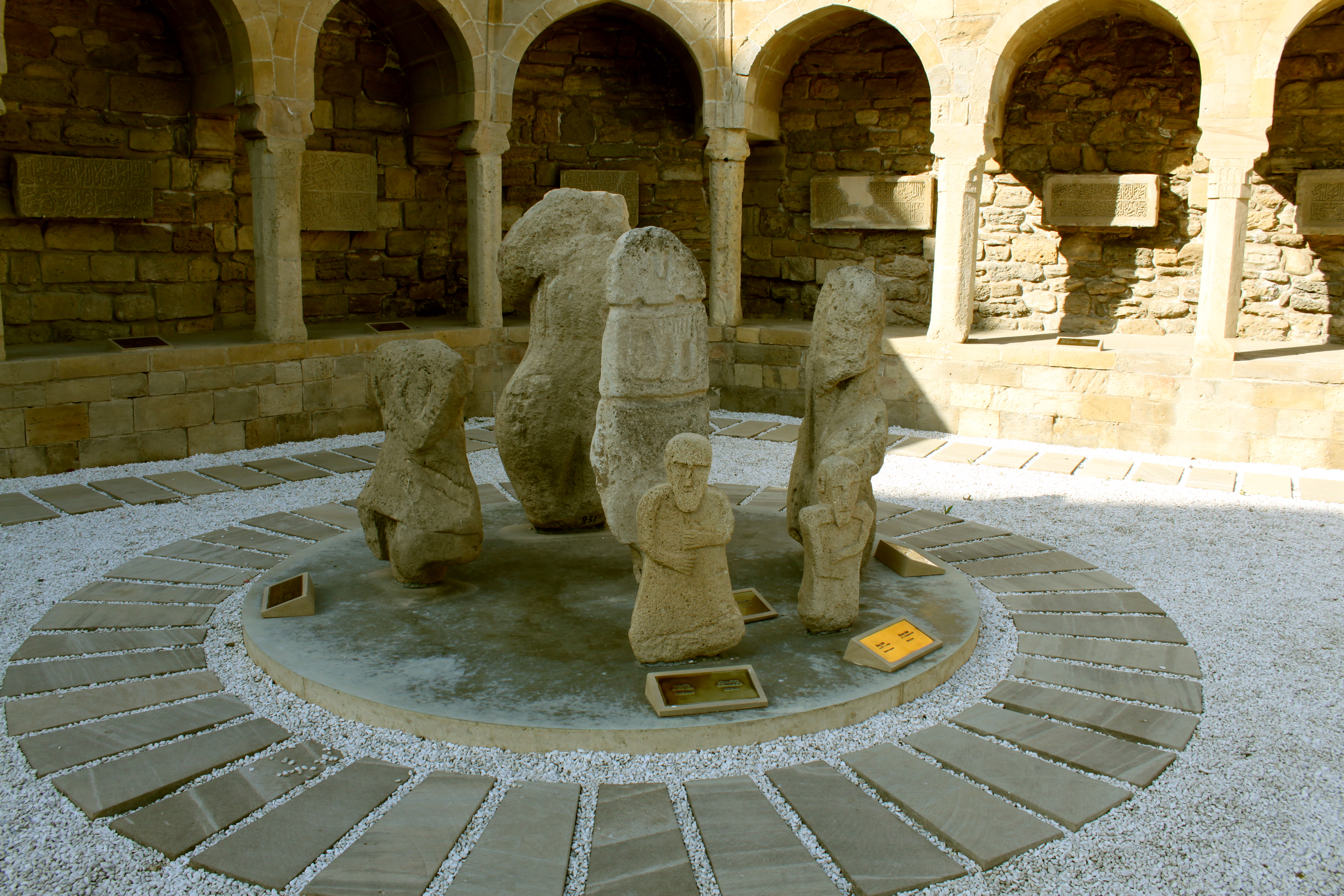

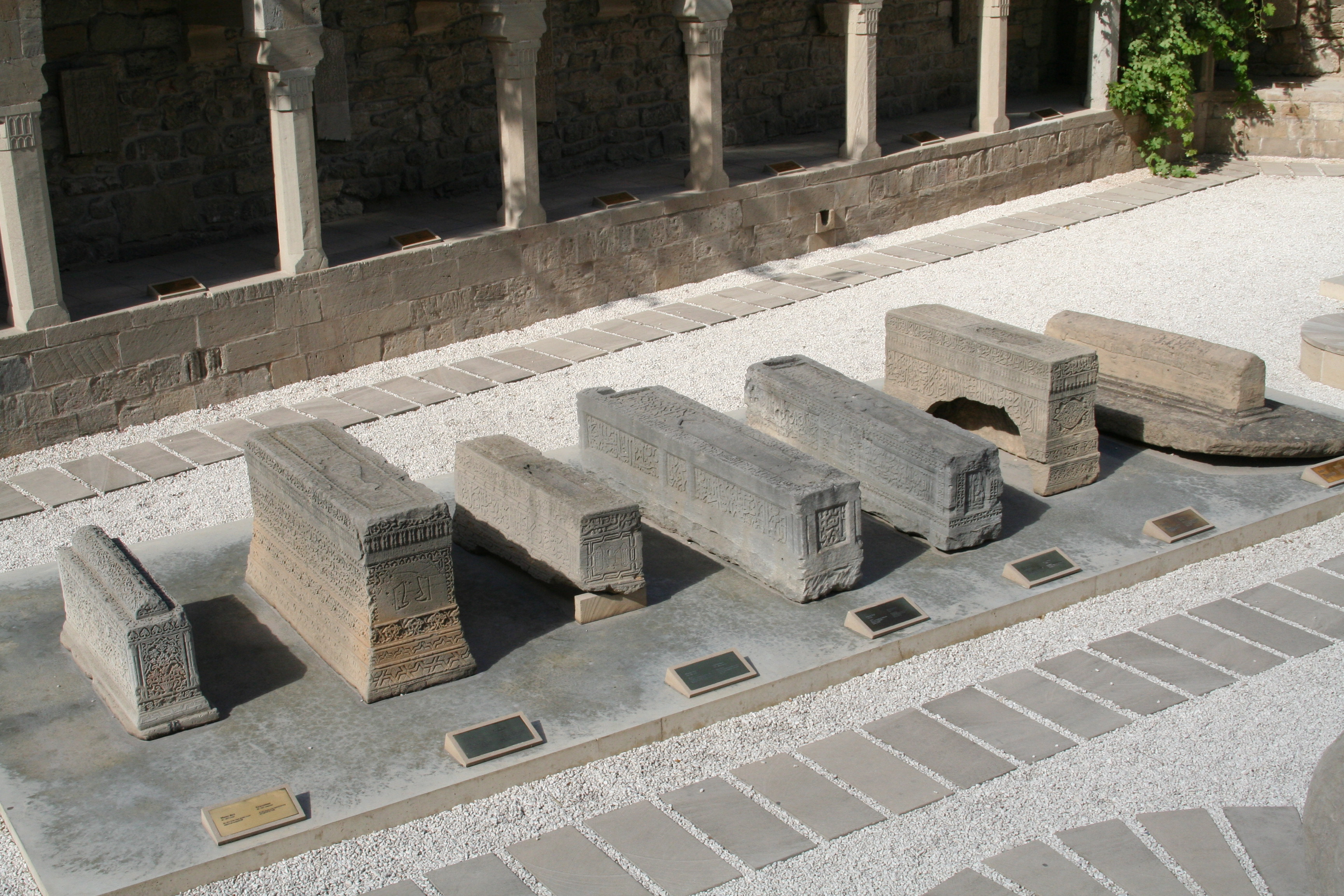

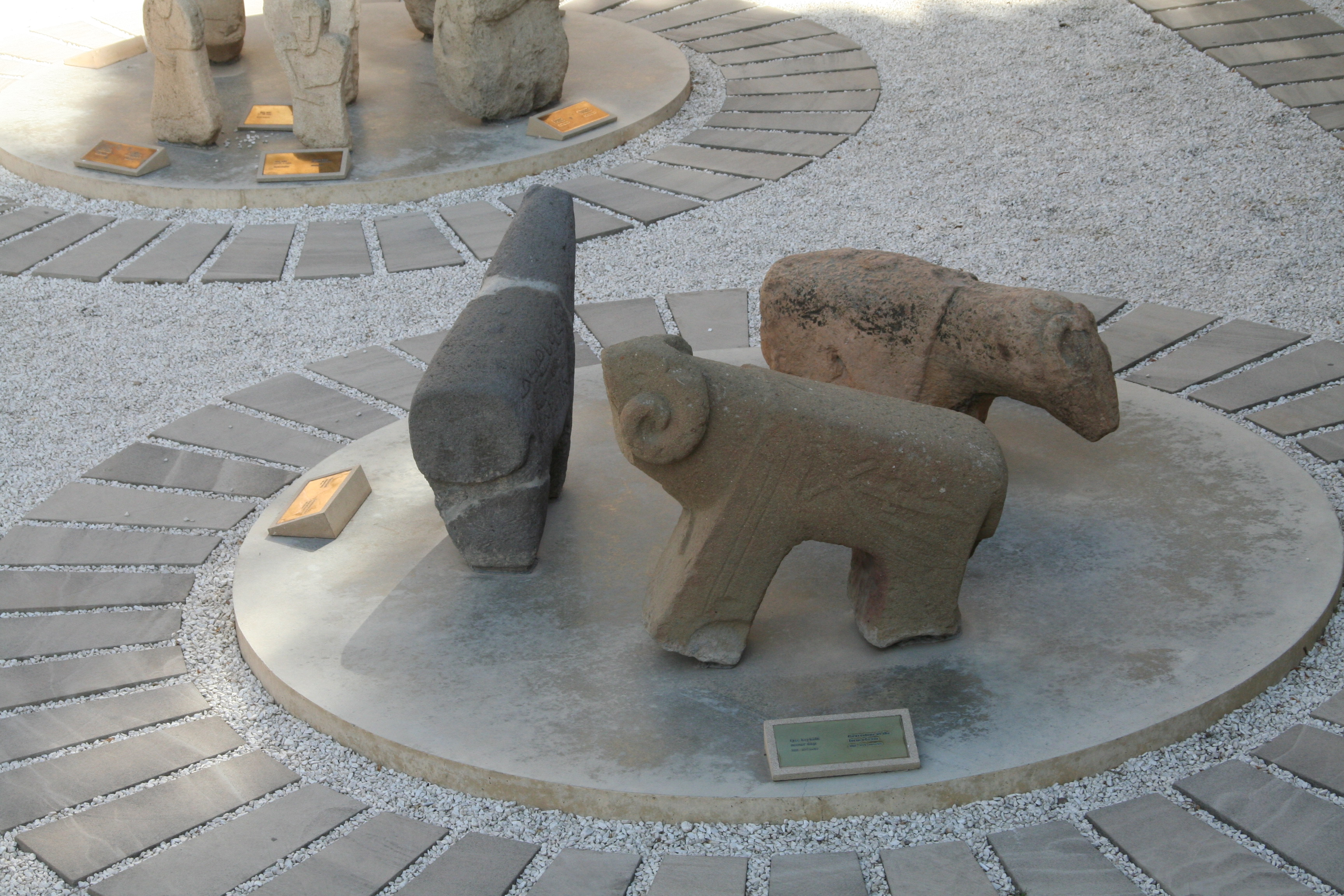

== See also ==
- Two-Storey Caravanserai
- Quadrangular Tower
