= Administration of the State Historical-Architectural Reserve "Icherisheher" =

Coordinates: 40°21′54″N 49°50′9″E

"Icherisheher" State Historical-Architectural Reserve Department
- “İçərişəhər” Dövlət Tarix- Memarlıq Qoruğu İdarəsi

Agency overview
- Formed: May 16, 2007
- Agency executive: Rufat Mahmud
- Website: www.icherisheher.gov.az

The Administration of the State Historical-Architectural Reserve "Icherisheher" was established by presidential order No. 629, dated February 10, 2005, under the Cabinet of Ministers of the Republic of Azerbaijan. This Administration was created to integrate the functions and powers of both central and local executive authorities, aiming to preserve, investigate, and ensure the restoration of historical monuments and the architectural-urban planning complex within the Icherisheher (Icherisheher) territory.

== History ==
The historical quarter known as "Icherisheher" is the oldest part of Baku and a historical-architectural reserve. The territory of the reserve has been inhabited since the Palaeolithic period and shows signs of cultural influence from Zoroastrian, Sasanian, Arabic, Persian, Shirvanshah, Ottoman, and Russian civilizations.

Archaeological studies have confirmed that by the 8th and 9th centuries, the area of Icherisheher was heavily populated, with a thriving crafts and trade sector. After the Shirvanshahs moved their residence from Shamakhi to Baku in the 15th century, a period of "crystallization" began in the life of the Inner City. From 1748 to 1806, Baku and its center, Icherisheher, served as the capital of the Baku Khanate. Following the Russian occupation of Baku in 1806 and the subsequent oil boom (late 19th-early 20th century), the city began to develop and expand, with people settling outside the walls of the Inner City.

During the years of Soviet rule, in 1952-1957, the fortress walls of the Inner City were restored. In 1977, the Inner City was given the status of a historical-architectural reserve, and in 1985 it was declared a State Historical-Architectural Reserve.

The Inner City still retains a significant portion of its defensive walls from the 12th century. Maiden Tower (12th century), the Shirvanshahs' Palace (15th century), with a group of historic monuments listed in 2000 under the UNESCO World Heritage List of Historical Monuments as cultural property, are located in the territory of Icherisheher.

On February 17, 2003, the former President of Azerbaijan, Heydar Aliyev, signed a decree "On some measures related to the protection and restoration of the Icherisheher Historical-Architectural Reserve in the city of Baku".

After the decree, the construction works to preserve the history of the city. On February 10, 2005, President Ilham Aliyev issued an order "On the establishment of the Administration of the State Historical-Architectural Reserve "Icherisheher under the Cabinet of Ministers of the Republic of Azerbaijan." The main goal of the department is to carry out measures for the protection, research and restoration of material and cultural monuments in the territory of Icherisheher, to ensure the socio-economic development of the reserve, to turn it into an international tourism center.

On November 24, 2016, the Administration of the State Historical-Architectural Reserve "Icherisheher" - a public legal entity - was established on the basis of the "Icherisheher" State Historical-Architectural Reserve Department which had the legal status of "Executive Authority" under the Cabinet of Ministers of Azerbaijan.

The Administration is guided by Azerbaijan's Constitution, laws, presidential decrees and orders, as well as decrees and orders of the Cabinet of Ministers, and Statute on "Icherisheher" State Historical-Architectural Reserve.

== Activity ==
"Head Plan" of the Old City was approved by the decision of the Cabinet of Ministers of Azerbaijan. The main goal of the plan was to ensure the systematic conservation of the architectural heritage of the Icherisheher. According to the Plan, it is planned to study the history of every building in the Old City, analyze their functional use, study their condition, determine their historical-architectural value, as well as determine the expediency of restoration works of the mentioned buildings.

== Management ==
The President of Azerbaijan approves the structure of the Administration and determines the number of employees of the apparatus. The activity of the Administration is headed by the chairman of the management board, appointed by the president of Azerbaijan. The chairman is responsible for fulfilment of the tasks entrusted to the Administration and implementation of the rights. The management board also includes two members appointed/dismissed by the Cabinet of Ministers with the consent of the President of Azerbaijan.

The chairman organizes and manages the activity of the Administration, approves the statutes of the structural units and divisions of the Administration, appoints and dismisses employees and heads of divisions of the Administration, issues orders and decrees, which are obligatory for execution in accordance with the legislation, organizes and supervises the execution of normative legal acts.

The chairman of the Board of the Administration is Shahin Seyidzade, who was appointed on March 3, 2022.

=== List of Chairmen ===
- Shahin Seyidzade (3 March 2022 — Present)
- Asgar Alakbarov (12 May 2016 — 3 March 2022)
- Samir Nuriyev (24 May 2013 — 12 April 2016)
- Mikayil Jabbarov (6 March 2009 — 16 April 2013)

== Structure ==
Administration of the State Historical-Architectural Reserve "Icherisheher" includes "Icherisheher" State Historical-Architectural Reserve Office, "Icherisheher" Museum Center, Housing and Maintenance Service, Workshop for scientific production and restoration work, Scientific and Cultural Center, Marionette Theatre, House-museum of Tahir Salahov, Magsud Ibrahimbeyov Creative Center, Icherisheher Center for Traditional Arts.

- The Housing and Maintenance Service was established for construction and rehabilitation works that carried out in the territory. In parallel, the division carries out sanitary, cleaning and planting works, as well as housing maintenance.
- The Icherisheher Museum Center enlightens the public about Icherisheher (Old City), which was included in the list of UNESCO World Heritage sites. The museum also collects and protects the national artefacts of the Old City. It was created by the Decree of the Cabinet of Ministers of the Republic of Azerbaijan on December 22, 2018 based on "Shirvanshahs Palace Complex" State Historical-Architectural Reserve Museum, Icherisheher History Museum, and Gala State Historical Ethnographic Reserve, which are part of the Administration of Old City State Historical and Architectural Reserve.
- Shirvanshahs’ Palace Complex museum provides preservation, studying and propagation of the monuments, architecture, culture, trading relations of the medieval feudal state Shirvanshahs. Gala State Historical-Ethnographic Reserve was established in accordance with the Resolution No 135 of the Council of Ministers of Azerbaijan SSR dated April 18, 1988.
- Workshop for scientific production and restoration work designs rehabilitation and regeneration projects for the monuments located in the territory of Reserve, investigates the causes of their deformation and destruction.
- Scientific and Cultural Center organizes and carries out scientific, historical and cultural studies of architecture, historical and cultural monuments of the territory. It also organizes cultural and public events to stimulate the interest in development and promotion of national culture.

== International Relations ==
The "Walled City of Baku with the Shirvanshah's Palace and Maiden Tower" was officially inscribed on the World Heritage List during the 24th session of the World Heritage Committee, which convened in Cairns, Australia, from November 27th to December 2, 2000.

Since 2016, the Conservation Department has been a member of the Network of European Museum Organizations (NEMO). In this context, employees from the museums within Icherisheher participated in a museum marketing training session conducted in Baku. This training, titled "Museum Marketing," took place on November 25th and 26th, 2017, under the guidance of Björn Stenvers. Twenty-five participants, representing four museums within Icherisheher, along with the marketing department of the Administration, convened to formulate a comprehensive museum marketing strategy, drawing upon international experiences, knowledge, and models.

Icherisheher has been a member of the Organization of World Heritage Cities (OWHC) since 2016. In 2015, the Maiden's Tower museum, under the purview of the State Historical-Architectural Reserve "Icherisheher", was nominated for the "Museum of the Year in Europe" competition organized by the European Museum Forum, with participation from museums across 21 European countries. Furthermore, since 2018, Icherisheher has established cooperation with the Research Centre for Islamic History, Art, and Culture (IRCICA).

== Archaeological excavations ==
In 1964, archaeological investigations conducted in the northern sector of the Maiden Tower uncovered an arched monument. This monument, which dates to the 12th century, is part of a religious-architectural complex that includes a colonnade with pointed arches that was built for religious purposes. Within the courtyard of this 15th-century monument, several pre-Islamic burial sites were discovered among the gravestones. The stratigraphic positioning of the monument, spanning multiple cultural layers, indicates that it might have been a place of worship over the centuries.

Adjacent to the Maiden Tower lies Saint Bartholomew Church, a medieval archaeological monument was built in 1892 at the expense of donations from the local Christian population on the site where the Apostle Bartholomew was believed to have been killed. The interior of the small chapel-shaped Orthodox Church was decorated with icons of Bartholomew and other saints. The church was built by architect Johann Edel in the architectural style of Russian churches. The remains of St. Bartholomew's Church were registered in 2015 as an archeological monument.

Situated on the lowest terrace of the complex, the palace bathhouse was unearthed in 1939 during the archaeological excavations. These excavations uncovered a substantial bathhouse consisting of 26 rooms, concealed beneath layers of earth, with a garden occupying the space above. In 1953, partial excavation efforts were undertaken, and by 1961, the bathhouse was temporarily closed. The architectural remnants reveal a structure featuring domed chambers with perforations facilitating natural light penetration. Its design, characteristic of Baku and Absheron baths, incorporates semi-subterranean elements aimed at preserving warmth in winter and coolness in summer.

== Gallery ==
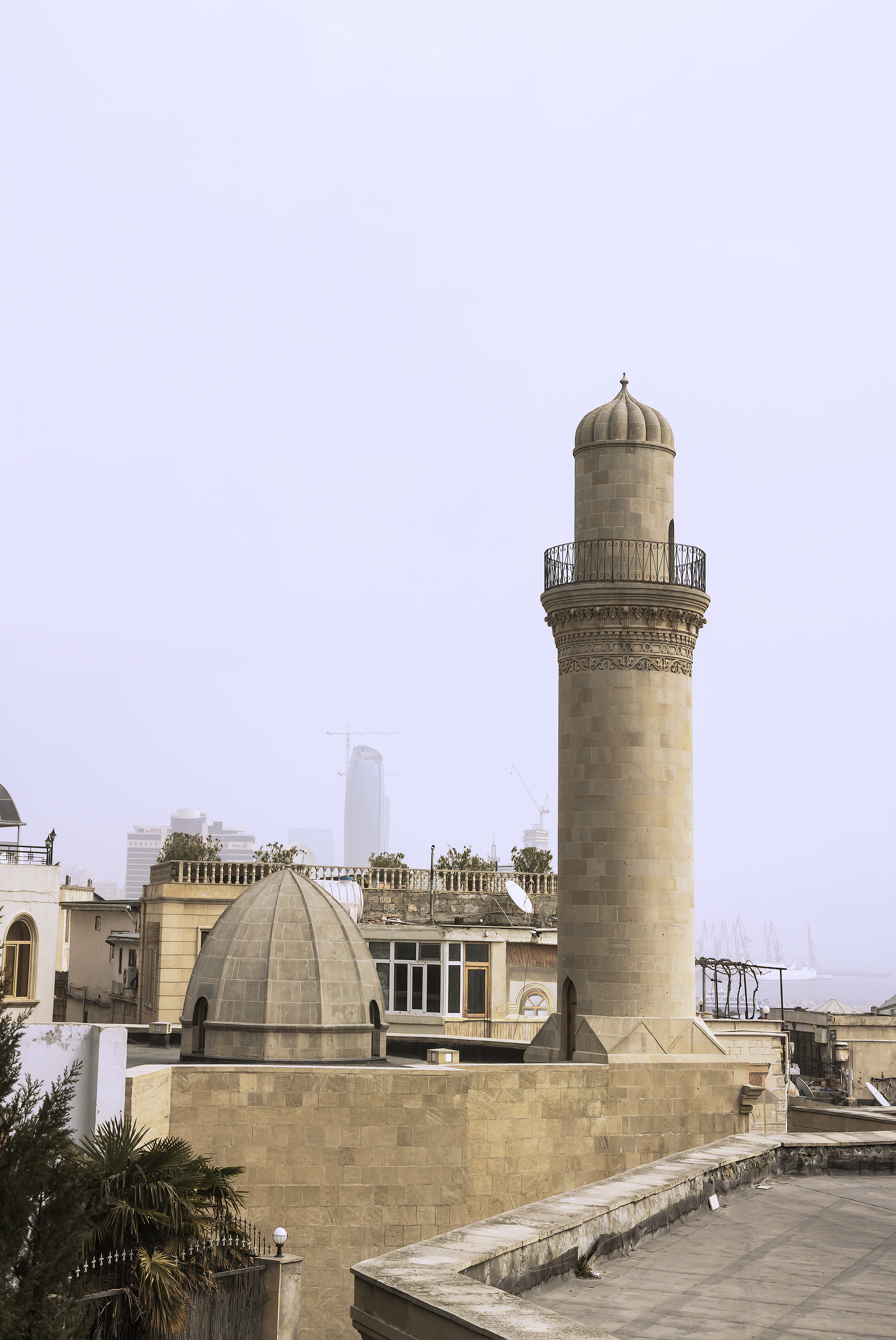
Mosque, Baku, Azerbaijan. "Icheri Sheher"

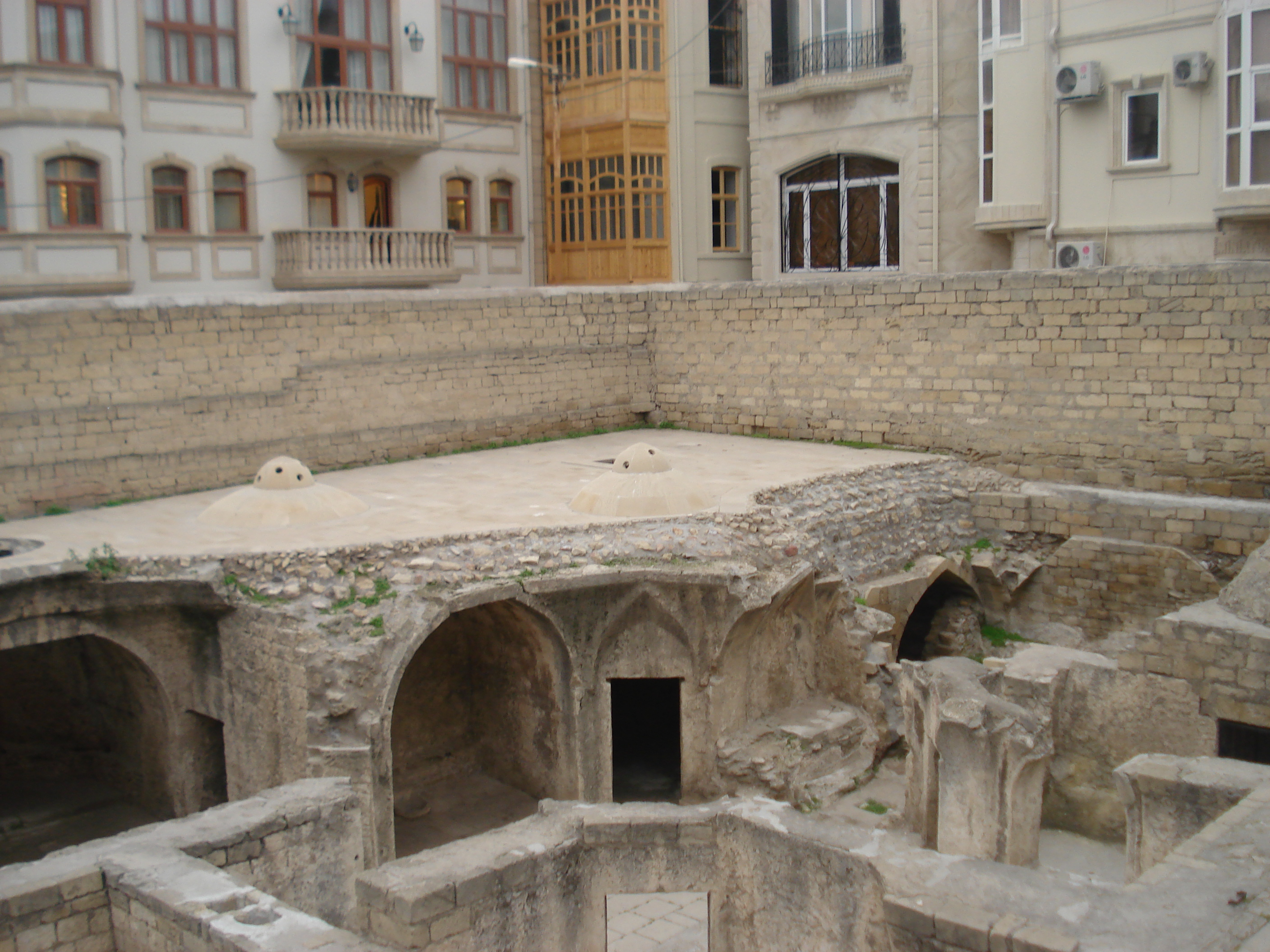
Ichery-Sheher 01

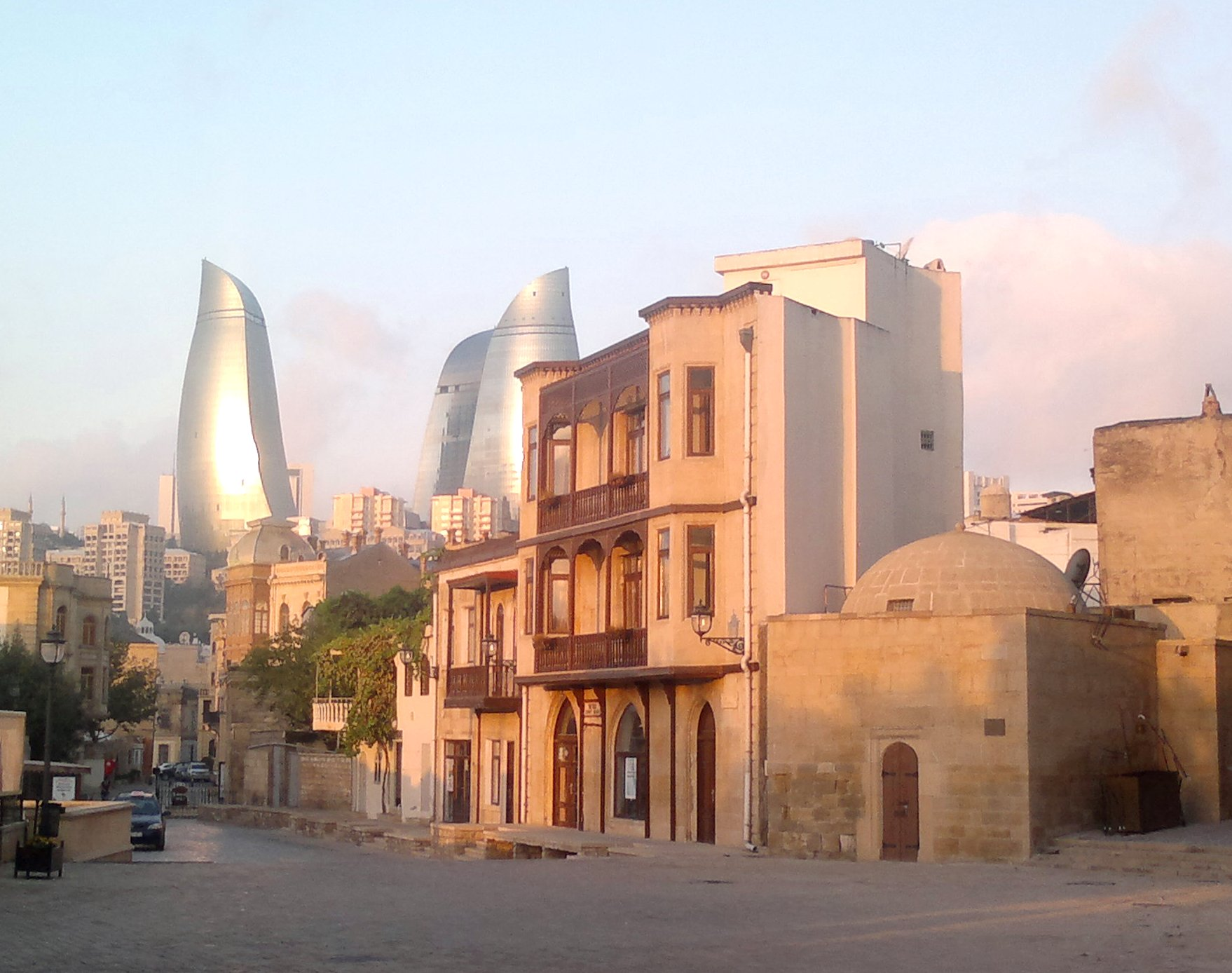
Mosque in Icheri Sheher

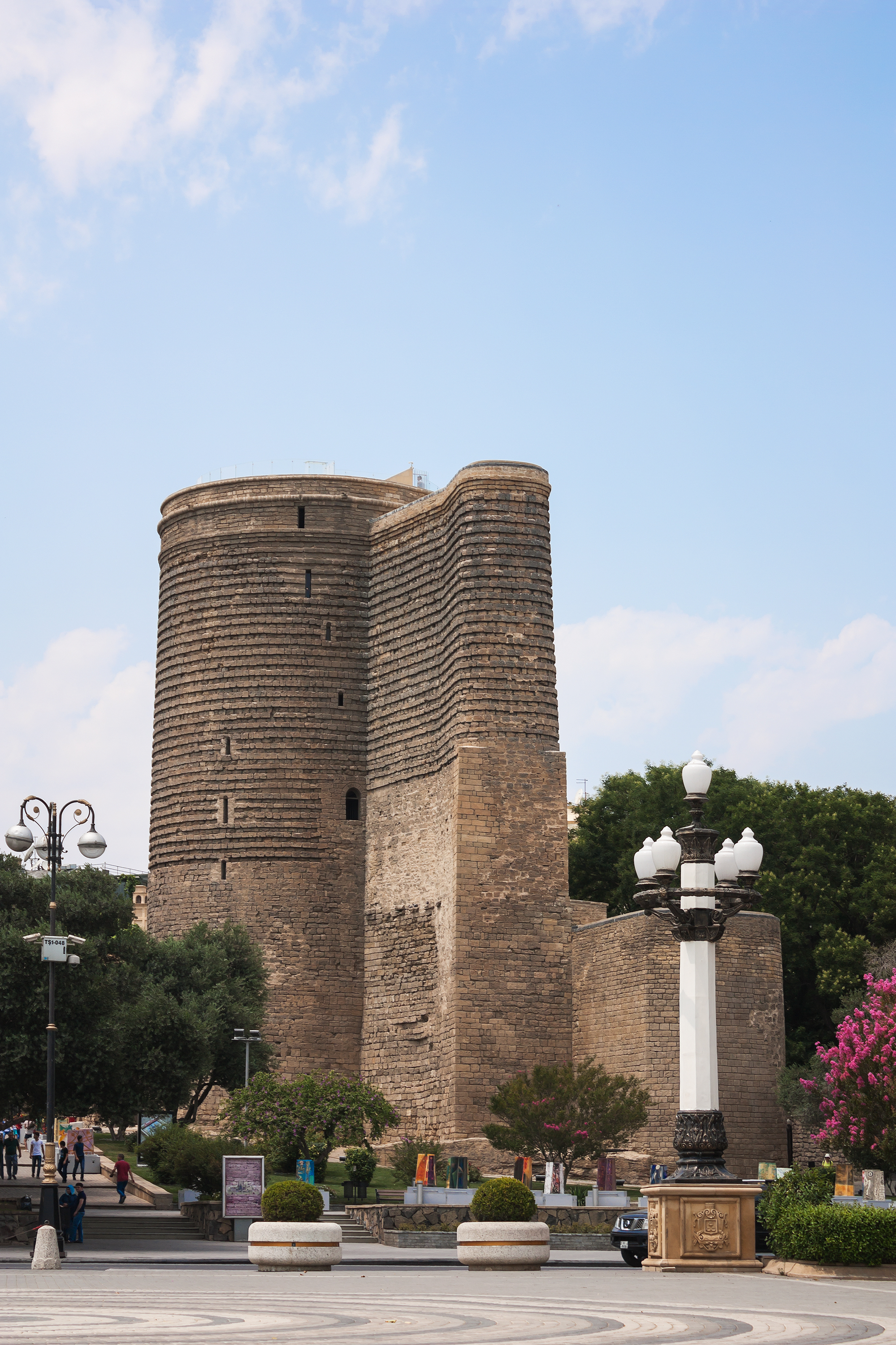
Maiden Tower in Baku 2015

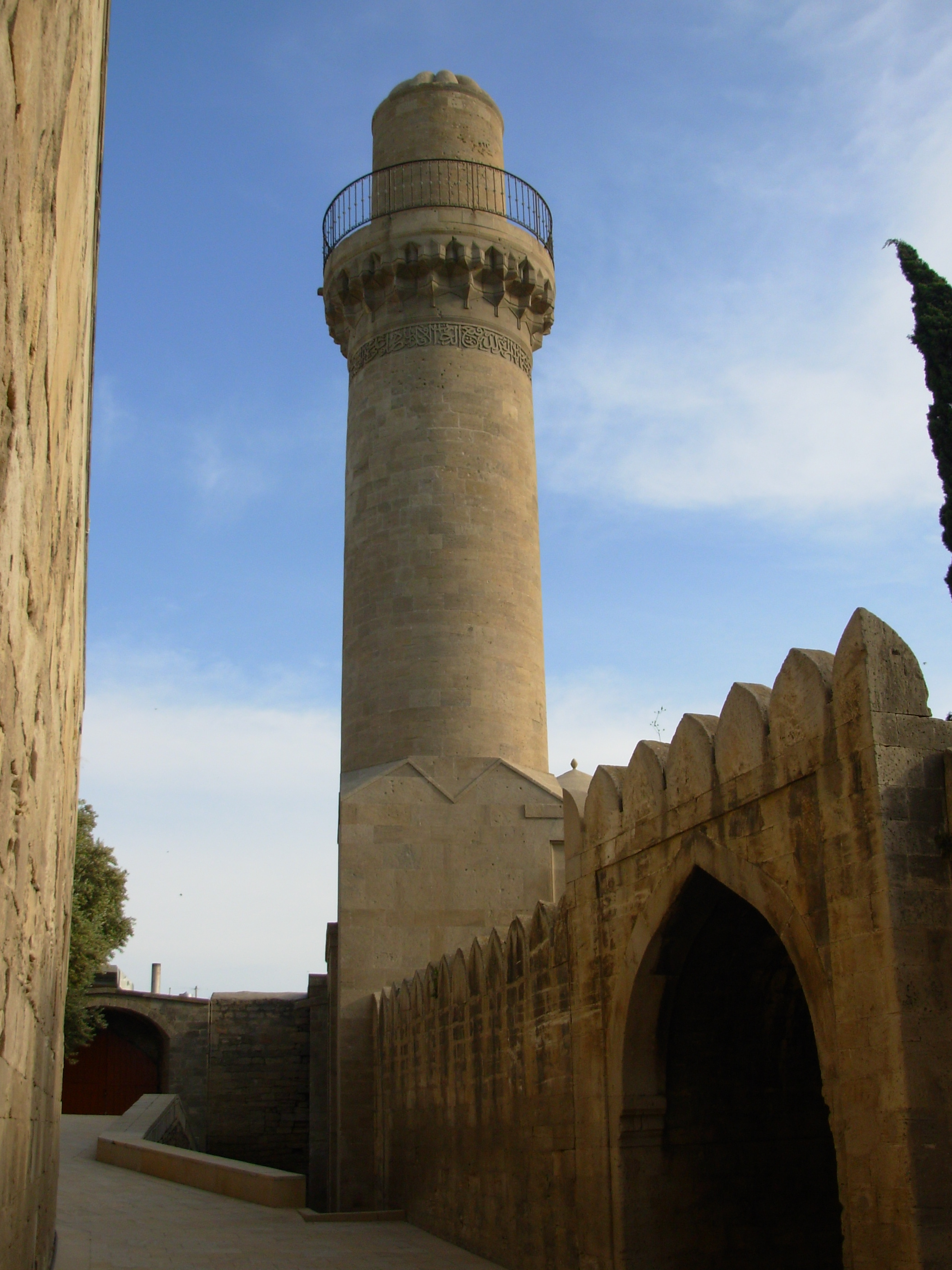
Shirvanshah Palace 002

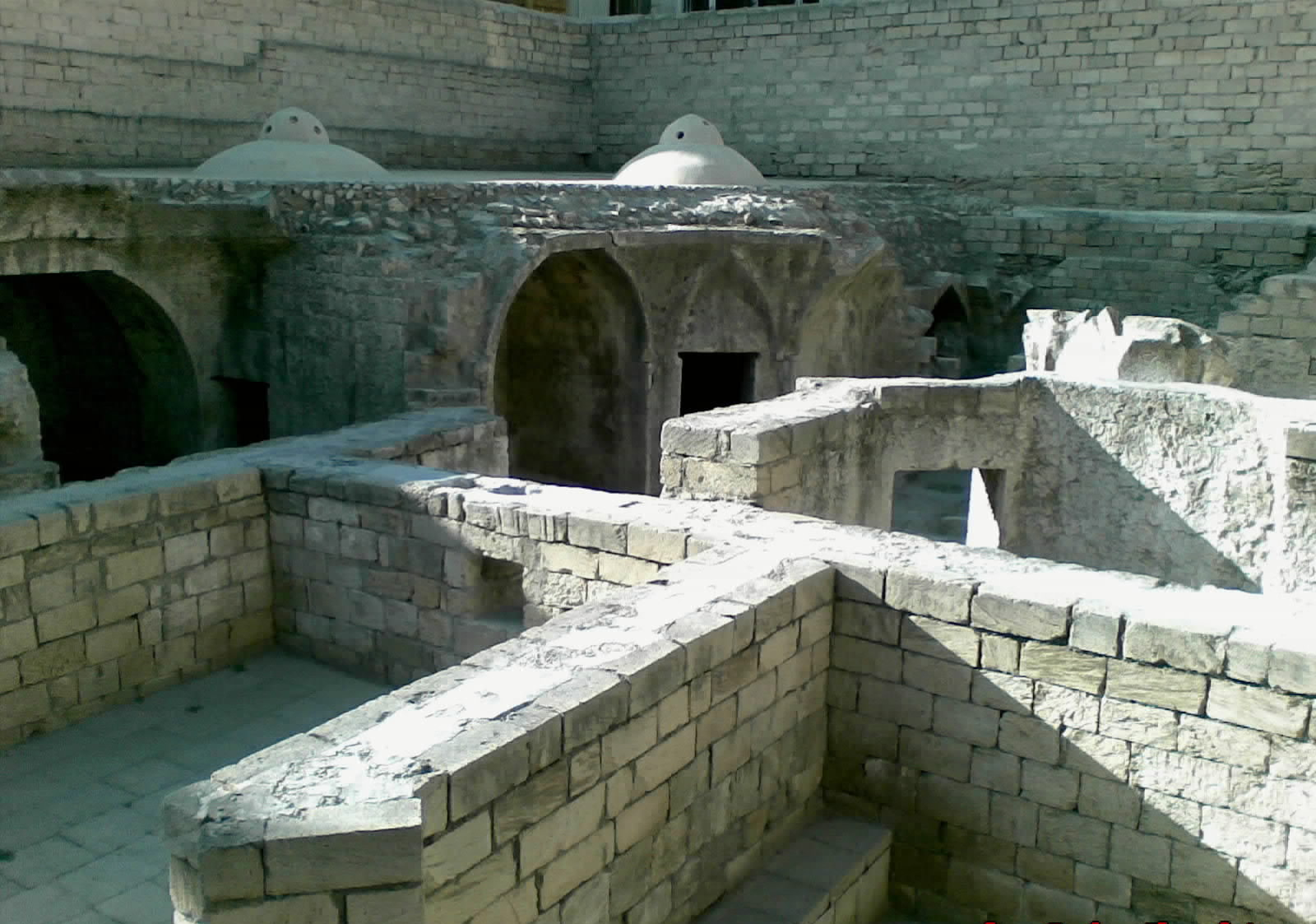
Icherisheher bath

== See also ==
- Palace of the Shirvanshahs
- Early Middle Ages in Azerbaijan
- High Middle Ages in Azerbaijan
- Maiden Tower (Baku)
- Gala State Historical Ethnographic Reserve
