= Two-Storeyed Caravanserai =

Two-storeyed caravanserai
- Azerbaijani: İkimərtəbəli karvansara
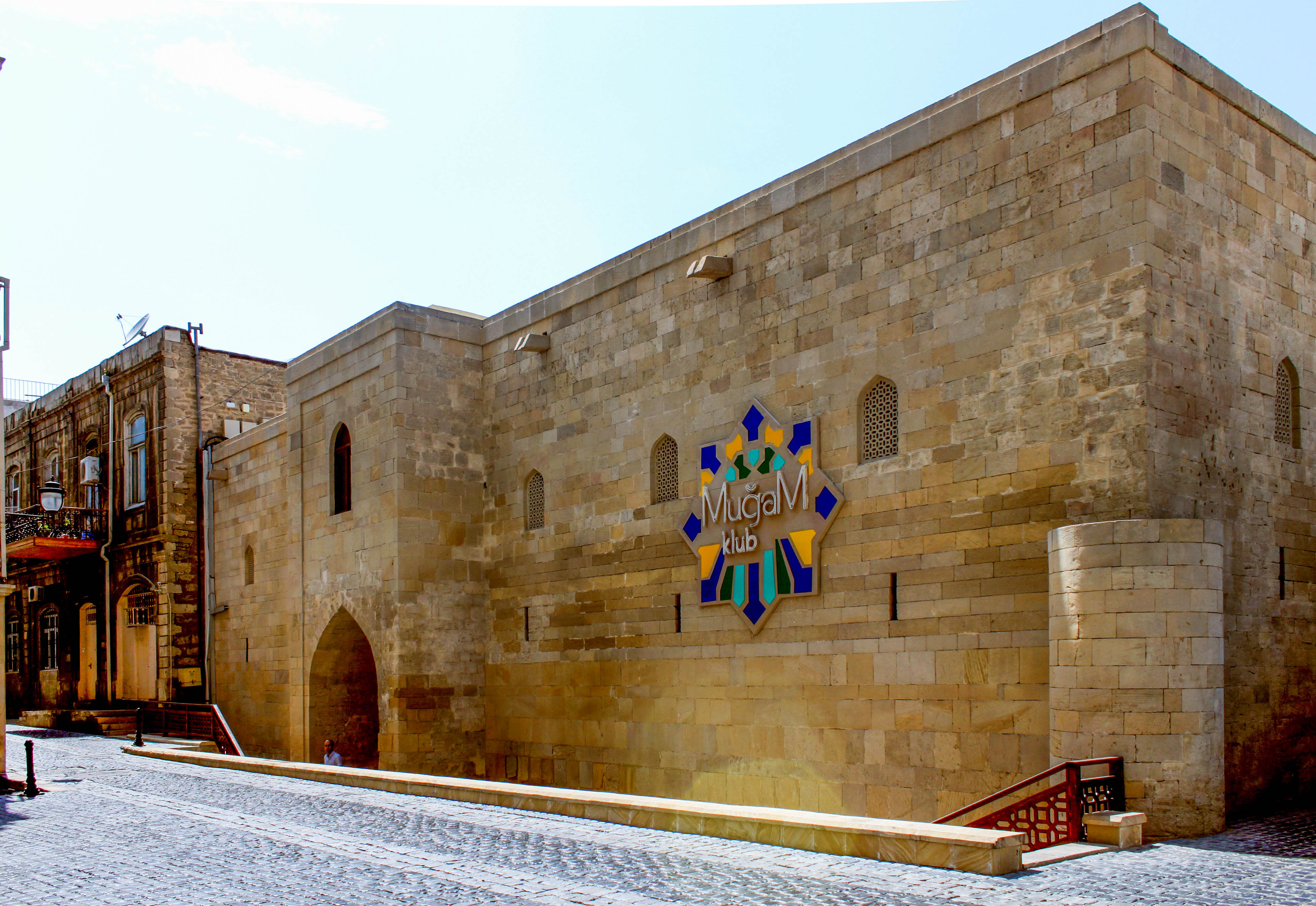

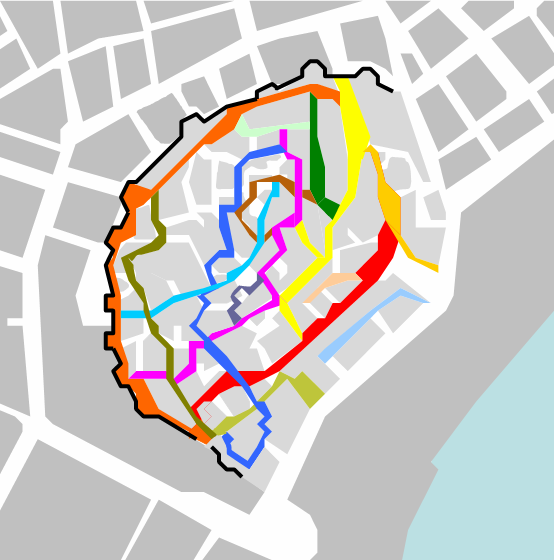
- Location within Streets in Old City, Baku, Azerbaijan

General information
- Status: Used as club
- Type: Caravanserai
- Architectural style: Architectural school of Shirvan-Absheron
- Location: Hagigat Rzayeva Street, Old City, Baku, Azerbaijan
- Coordinates: 40°21′56″N 49°50′12″E
- Completed: 15th century

Two-storeyed caravanserai (Azerbaijani: İkimərtəbəli karvansara) or Gasim bey caravanserai (Azerbaijani: Qasım bəy karvansarası) is a historic monument of the XV century. It is a part of Old City and located on Hagigat Rzayeva street, in the city of Baku, in Azerbaijan. The building was also registered as a national architectural monument by the decision of the Cabinet of Ministers of the Republic of Azerbaijan dated August 2, 2001, No. 132.

== History ==
The caravanserai was constructed in the XV century. According to the sources, it was built by Shirvan Khalilullah I and was used by Gasim bey and his followers.

== Architectural features ==
There are two-sided open entries of the caravanserai placed on the same axis. Entrance to the caravanserai is possible with offshore streets related with sea trade and with a part where trade highway located. It is in square form by its interior structure plan.

Internal area of the caravanserai is octahedral and it consists of a yard which is surrounded by balconies, where several rooms are located. Covers of rooms and domes of balconies are in pointed form. The rooms in the corner are completed with little domes. Entrances to the monument are finished with portals bulging at height of the caravanserai and with deep niches at the level of the first floor. The caravanserai is protected from southeast side with whole corner towers. It also shows its defensive characteristics in the system of city walls.

== Gallery ==
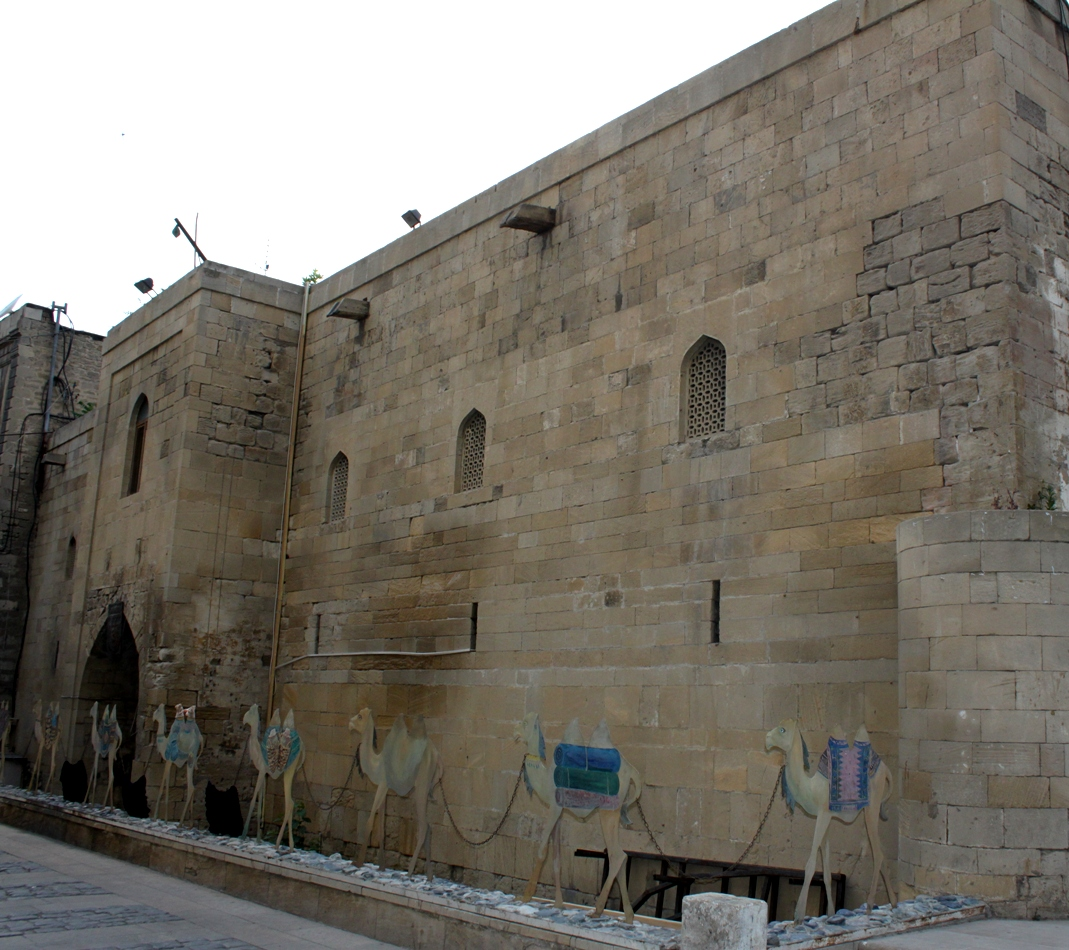

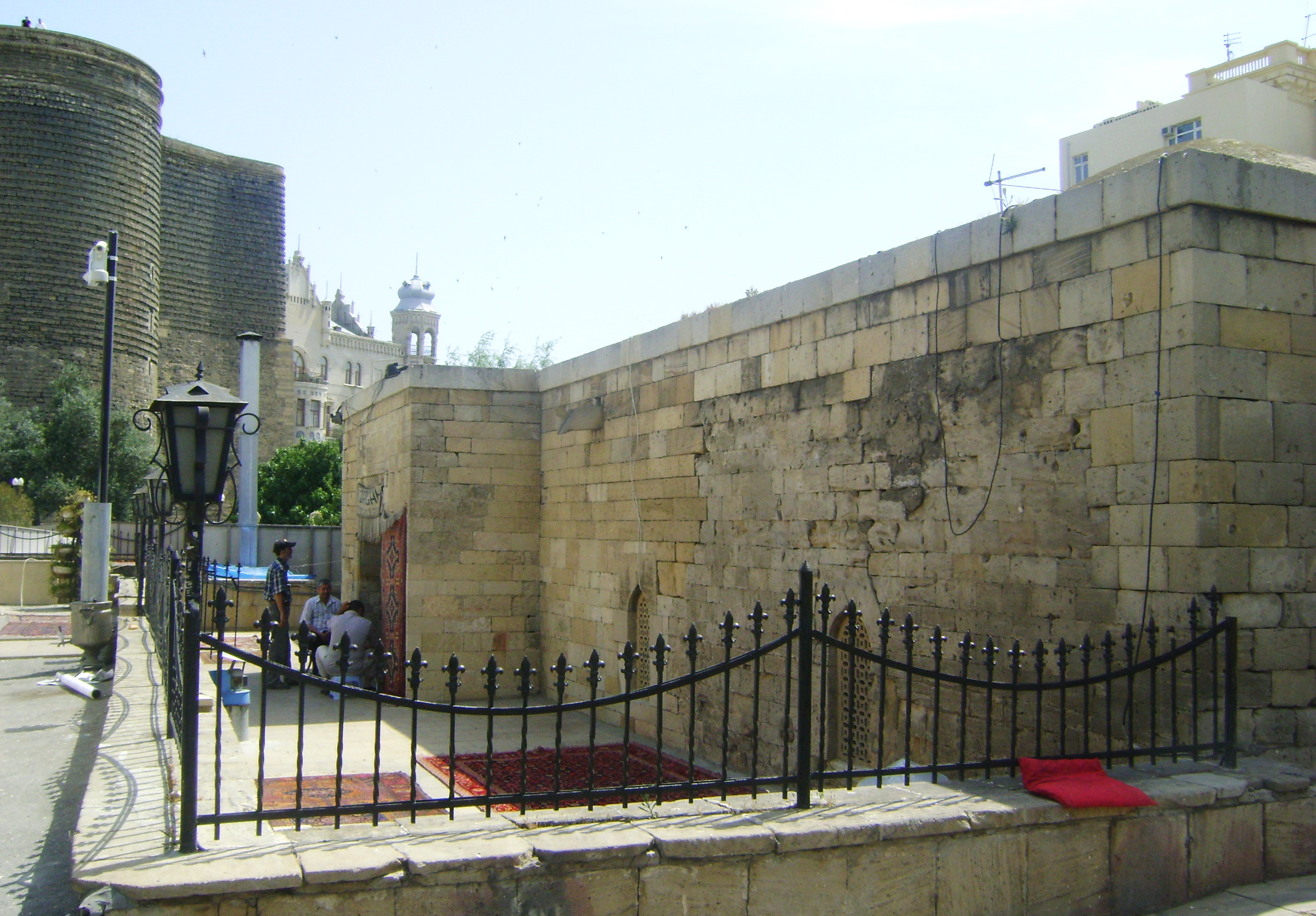

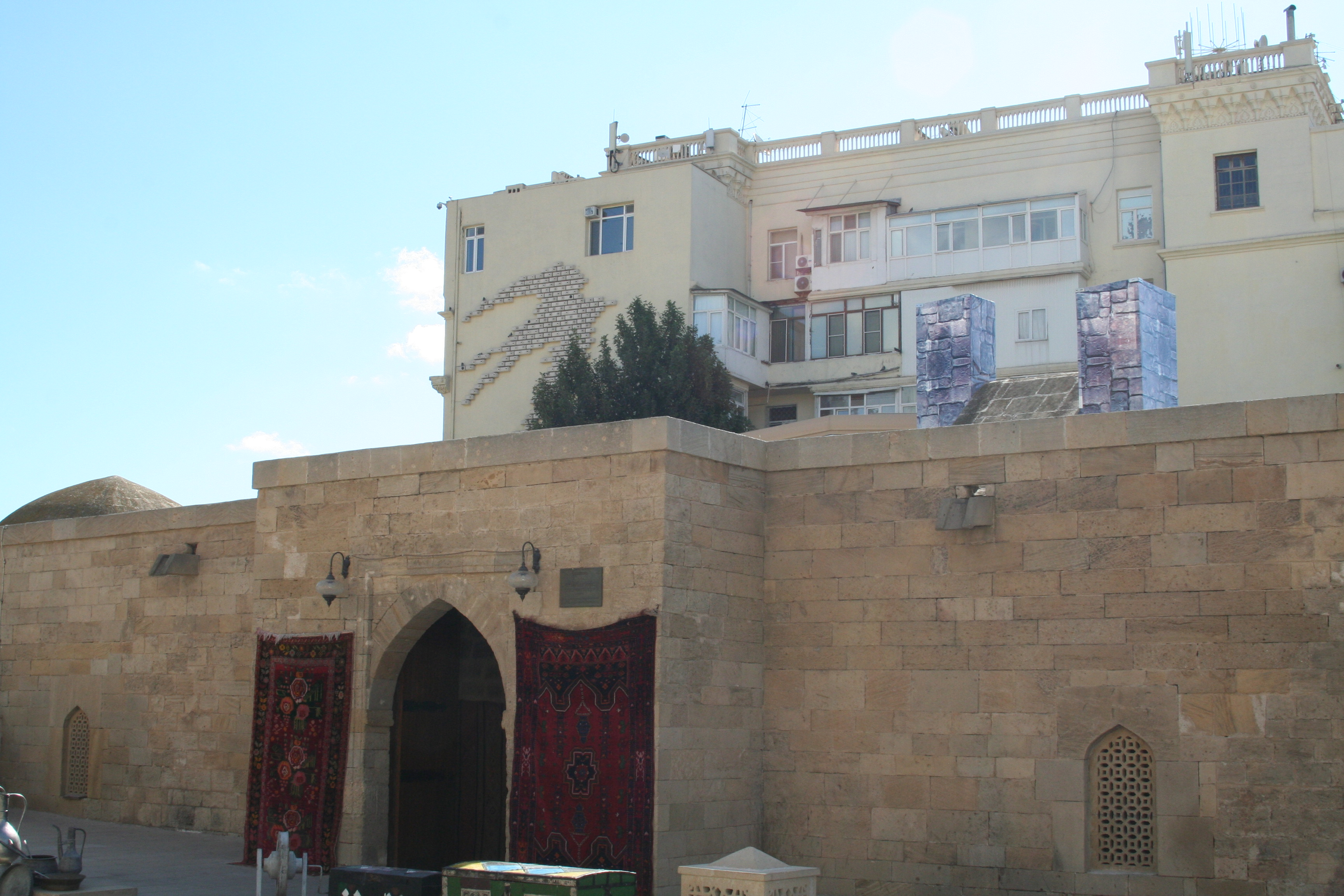

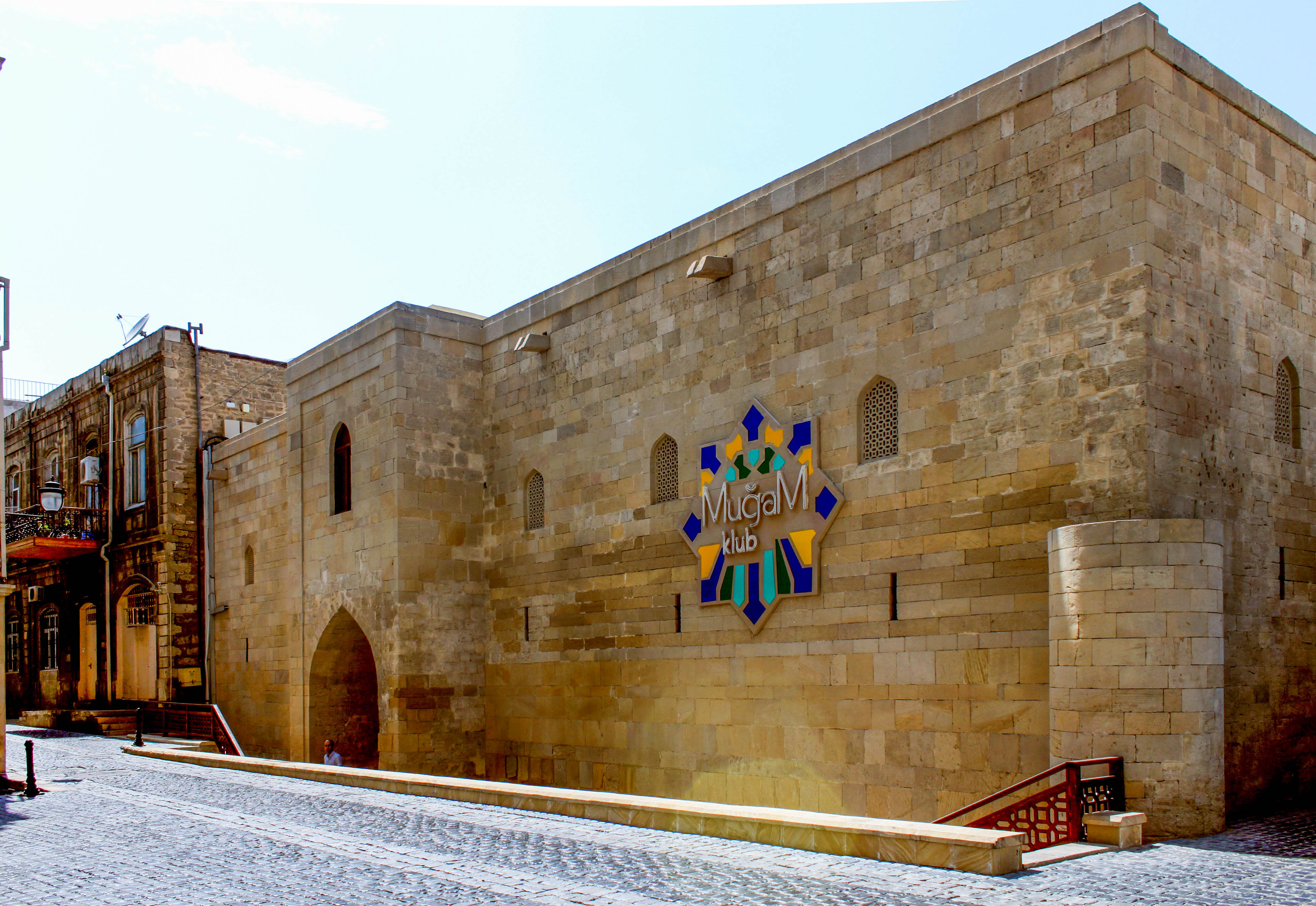

== See also ==
- Small Caravanserai
