= Beyler Mosque =

Former mosque in Baku, Azerbaijan

- Azerbaijani: Bəylər Məscidi
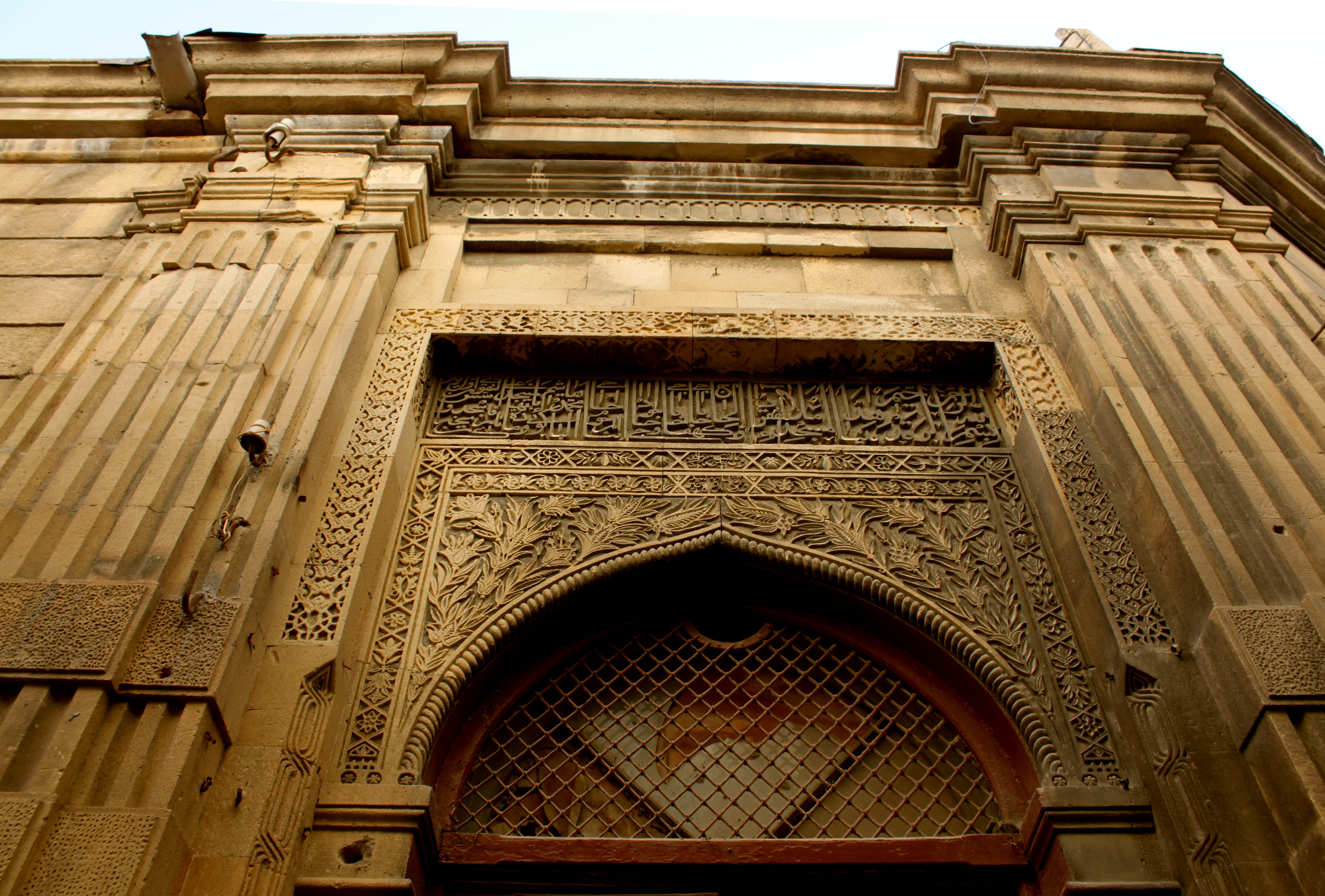
- Inscriptions on the former mosque

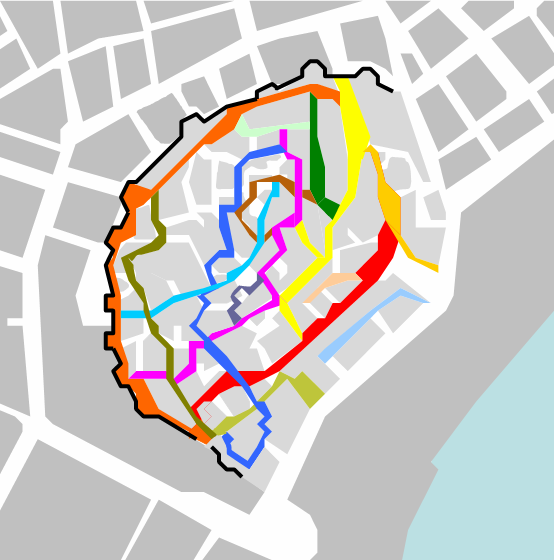
- Location in the mosque in the Baku Old City

Religion
- Affiliation: Shia Islam (former)
- Ecclesiastical or organisational status: Mosque (1895–1928); Profane use (1928–1991); Museum (since 2016)
- Status: Abandoned (as a mosque); Repurposed (as a museum)

Location
- Location: Old City, Baku
- Country: Azerbaijan
- Coordinates: 40°21′58″N 49°50′04″E

Architecture
- Architect: Seyid Hüseyn
- Type: Mosque architecture
- Style: Islamic
- Funded by: Haji Sheikhali Agha Dadashov
- Completed: 1895

Specifications
- Minaret: One
- Minaret height: 25 m (82 ft)

The Beyler Mosque is a former Shia Islam mosque and historic architectural monument which is located in the Old City of Baku, opposite the Murad Gate of the Shirvanshah Palace Complex, in Azerbaijan.

According to the order of the Cabinet of Ministers of Azerbaijan on historical and cultural monuments, the Beyler Mosque has been included to the list of historical and cultural monument of national importance.

Restored and repurposed, the former mosque has housed the Museum of Sacred Relics since 2016.

== About ==
=== Early periods ===
Beylər Mosque was built in 1895 in the north-western part of the İcherisheher, near the Murad Gate of the Shirvanshahs' Palace. The mosque got its name because it was commissioned by the famous Beys (noblemen) of Baku. The construction of the mosque was financially supported by Muhammad Hashim Al-Bakui’s sons, Haji Baba and Haji Javad, as well as the renowned millionaire Murtuza Mukhtarov. The mosque’s architect was Seyid Hüseyn, while the calligraphers involved in the design were Ibrahim Shirvani, Mir Ali en-Nağı, and Mir Taghi. This mosque is also the last mosque built in the İcherisheher.

After the Soviet occupation in Azerbaijan, the official campaign against religion began in 1928. In December of that year, the Central Committee of the Communist Party of Azerbaijan transferred many mosques, churches, and synagogues to the balance of clubs for educational purposes. While there were 3,000 mosques in Azerbaijan in 1917, by 1927, this number had decreased to 1,700, in 1928 it was 1,369, and by 1933, only 17 mosques remained.

During this period, the Beyler Mosque was closed for worship, and the building was repurposed as a sports hall.

=== After independence ===
After Azerbaijan restored its independence, the mosque was included in the list of national historical and cultural monuments by the Cabinet of Ministers of the Republic of Azerbaijan in its decision No. 132, dated August 2, 2001.

In 2014-2015, the restoration of the mosque was carried out with the involvement of the renowned Austrian restoration expert, Erix Pummer, invited by the State Historical and Architectural Reserve of the İcherisheher. During the restoration work, the Center for Traditional Arts of the İcherisheher also participated, and the doors and windows of the mosque were decorated with architectural elements.

After the restoration of the Beyler Mosque, the Museum of Sacred Relics opened in 2016. The museum’s exhibition features ancient Qurans from various periods. It showcases 73 Qurans, 7 religious books, and 19 religious artifacts, totaling 99 exhibits. Notable items include pages of books saved from fires and a Quran from the Derbent mosque, which was walled into the structure by the mullah for preservation. These relics were discovered and collected from libraries and private collections in different regions of Azerbaijan that had been affected by fires.

== Structure ==
The mosque's hall stands out from other religious monuments due to its size and architectural structure. Its construction combines European, Eastern, and local architectural principles. The upper part of the beautifully designed minaret is adorned with decorative elements typical of Western European style. The minaret is 25 m (82 ft) tall. The overall layout of the hall follows the design of three-nave basilicas, commonly found in churches, where the hall is divided into three sections by columns. The portal and mihrab of the mosque feature stone-masonry and examples of artistic stone carving. The architectural monument was built on the site of an ancient mosque and has been successfully integrated into the planning features of the curved street. The Beyleir Mosque, with its single minaret, includes a vestibule and a three-nave prayer hall in its interior.

It has a lobby, a prayer hall, and a decorated mihrab. The prayer hall is three-naved, which is characteristic for the mosques of Azerbaijan, which were built since the second half of the 19th century, and is found not only at the mosques of Baku and Absheron, but also of Shirvan, Karabakh, Guba, Sheki and Zagatala. Similar structures have Turkic peoples in the era of feudalism. Around the mosque a park is located with interesting design.

== Gallery ==
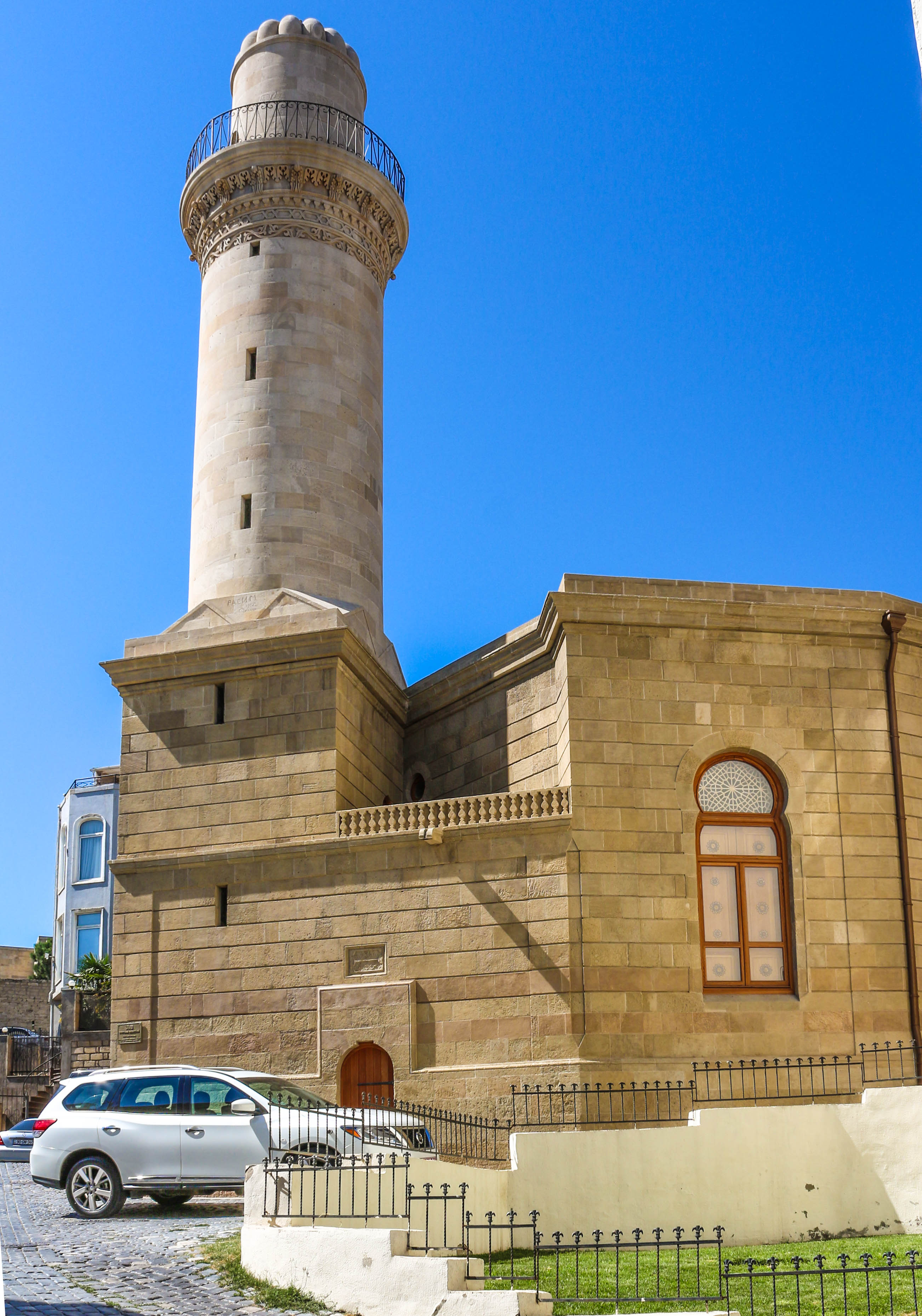

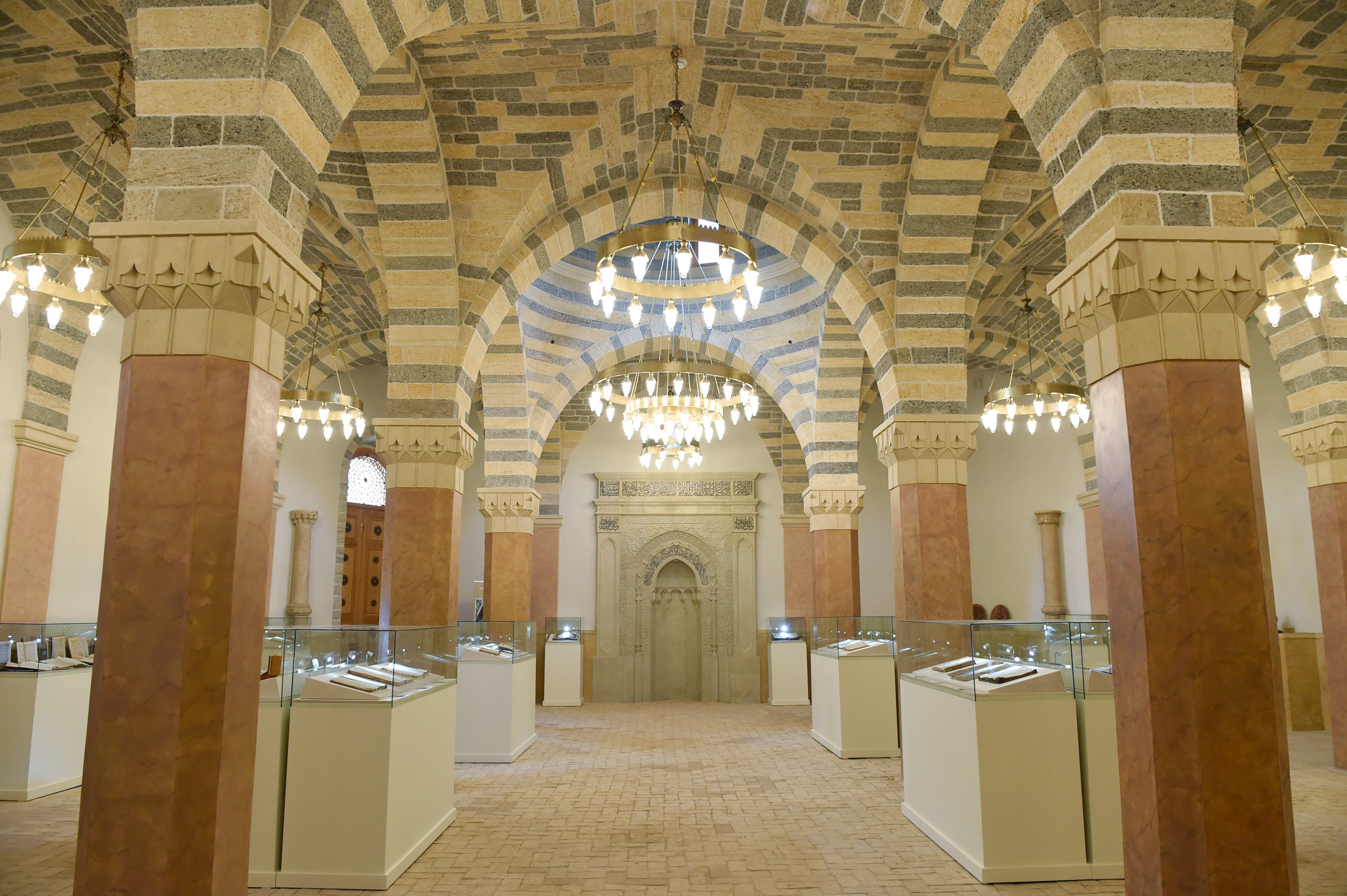

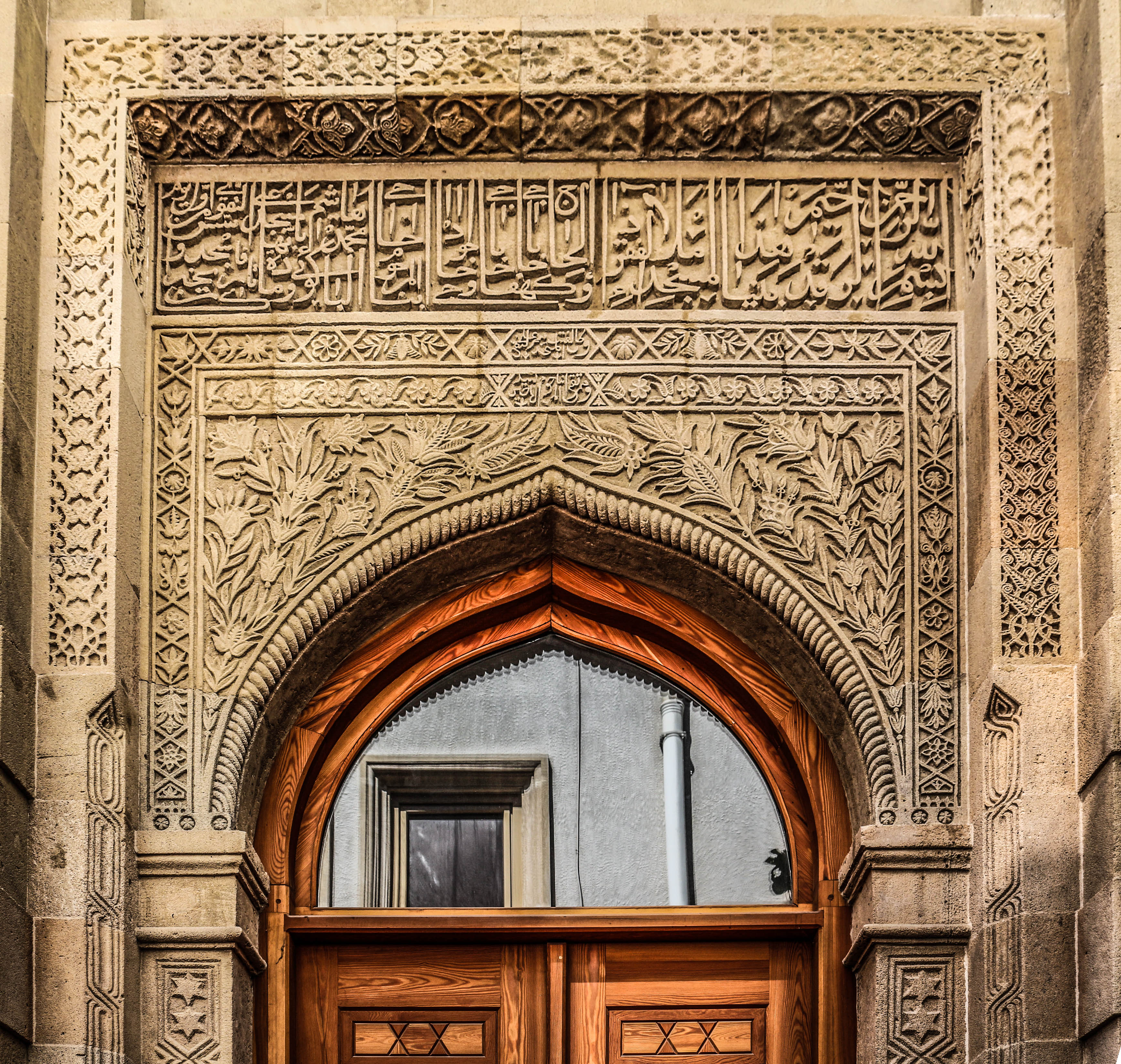

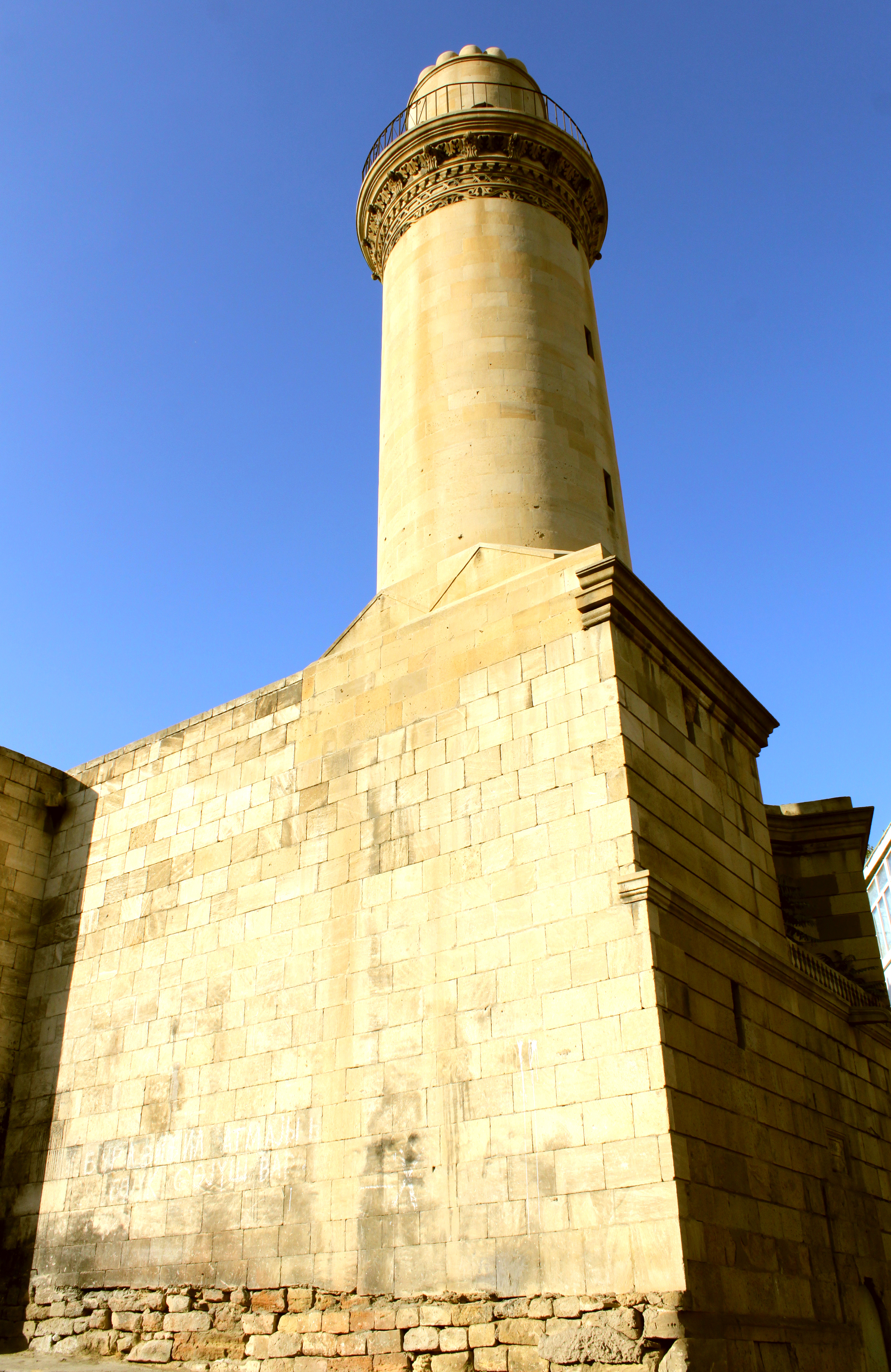

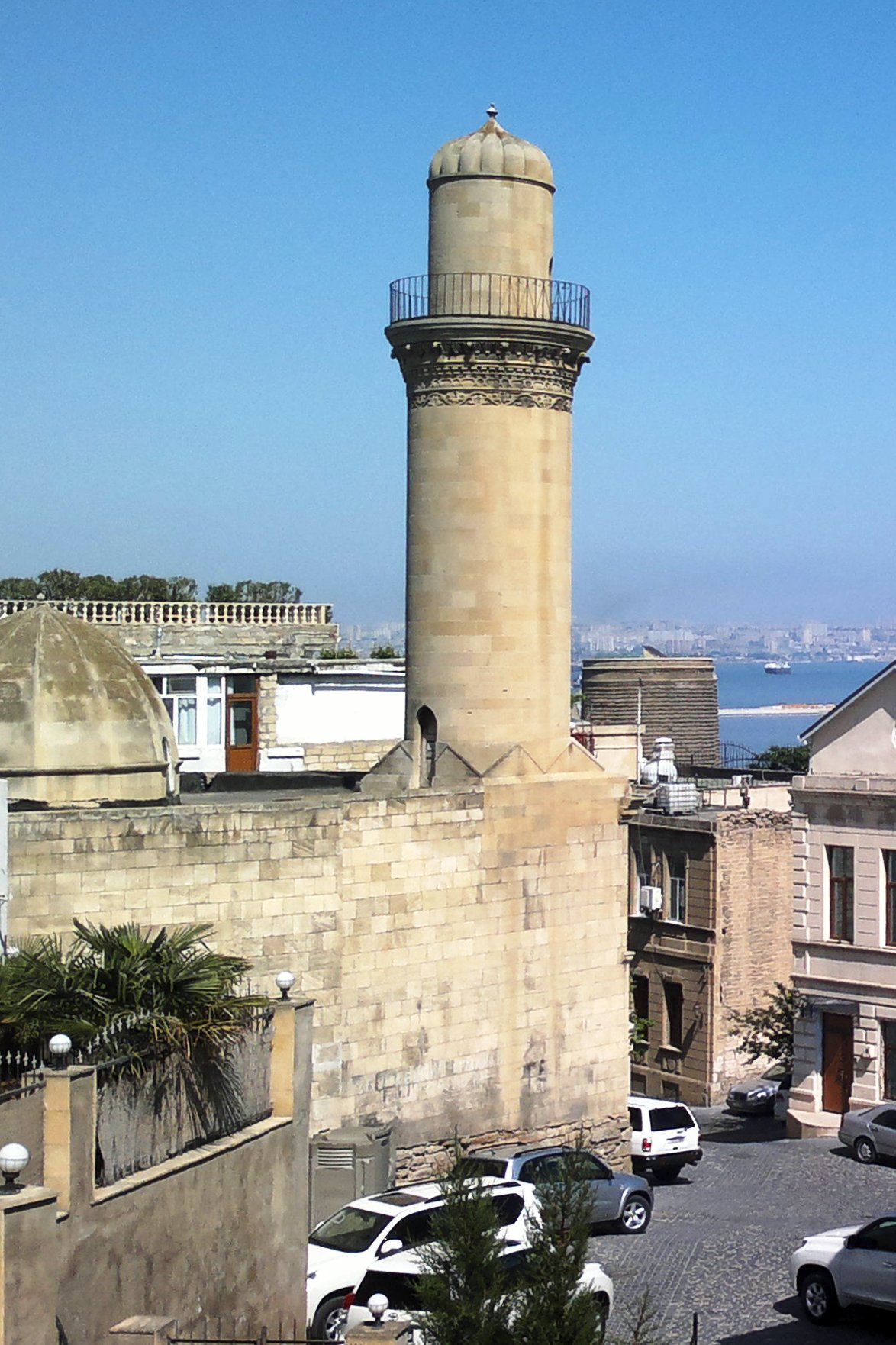

== See also ==
- Shia Islam in Azerbaijan
- List of mosques in Baku
