= Quadrangular Tower =

Quadrangular tower
- Azerbaijani: Dördbucaqlı qala
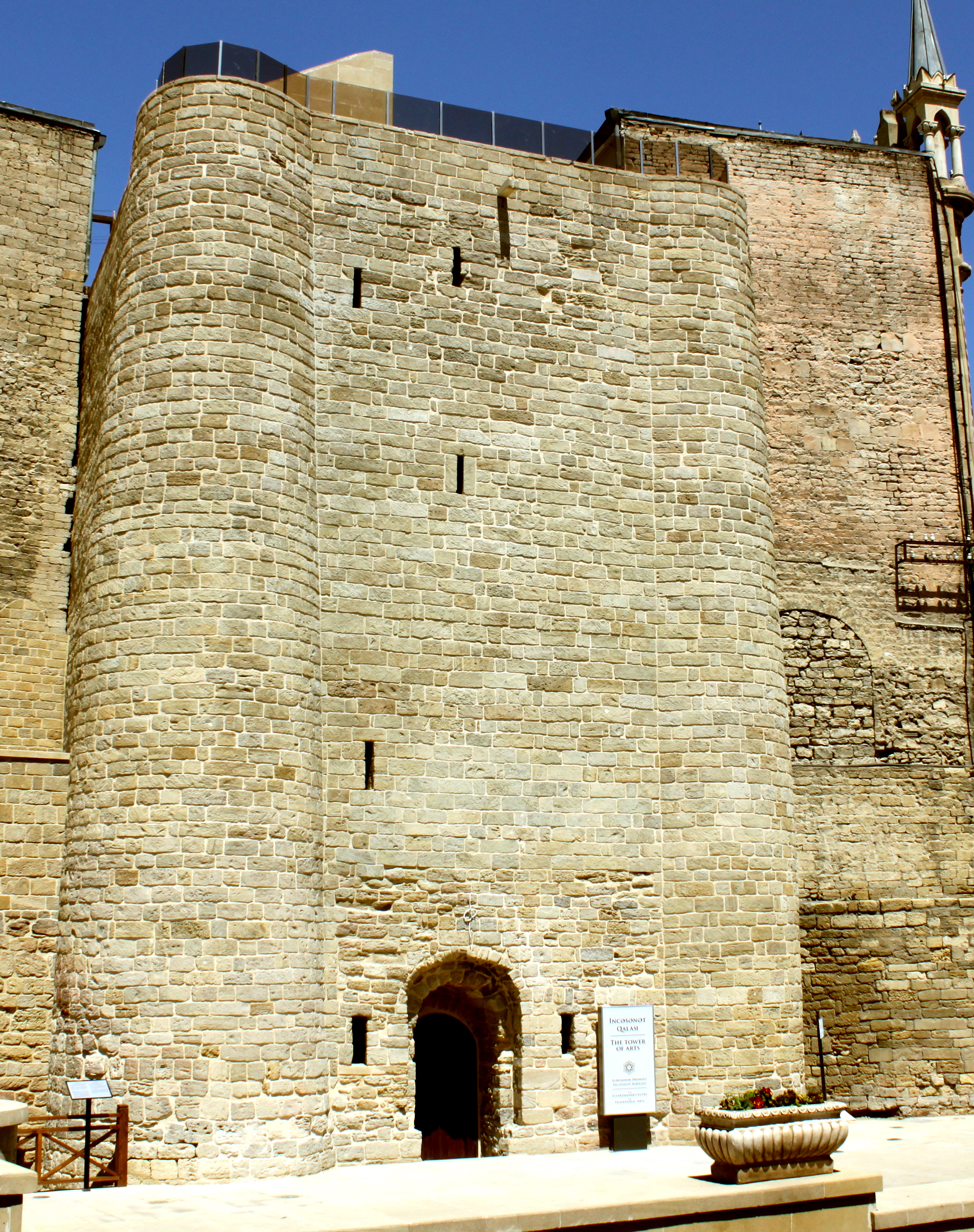

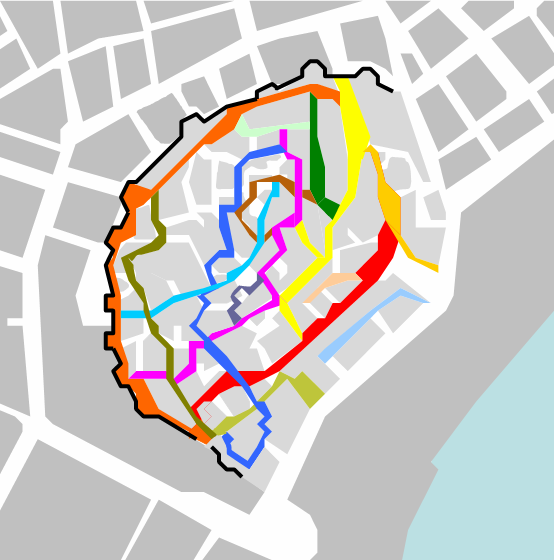
- Location within Streets in Old City, Baku, Azerbaijan
- Alternative names: Keep of the Fortress of Baku

General information
- Status: Restored; Operating as The Tower of Arts
- Type: Keep
- Architectural style: Architectural school of Shirvan-Absheron
- Location: Kichik Gala Street, 13, Old City, Baku, Azerbaijan
- Coordinates: 40°22′04″N 49°50′03″E
- Completed: 14th century

Height
- Height: 16 m (52 ft)

Quadrangular Tower (Azerbaijani: Dördbucaqlı qala), or Keeper of the Fortress of Baku (Azerbaijani: Bakı qalasının donjonu), is a stone keep built in the 14th century. It is part of the Old City in Baku, Azerbaijan. On August 2, 2001, the building was declared a "national architectural monument" by the Cabinet of Azerbaijan.

== History ==
The tower was built in the 14th century and was an integral part of the fortress wall and the defensive fortifications in Baku. Construction was done to maintain the architecture and integrity of the fortress walls. The towers were built to make the defense system easier. According to medieval authors, within 70 semicircular and northern walls of the Baku Fortress Wall was a quadrangular fortress-type tower. In the Middle Ages it was used as an armory. The tower was built to store weapons and to further strengthen the northern part of Baku.

In 2014, substantial repair and restoration works were held on the tower by the Old City State Historical-Architectural Reserve Department. After that, it started to operate as the Old City Traditional Art Center under the name "The Tower of Arts."

== Architectural features ==
The height of the tower is 16 meters, the thickness of the walls is 2 meters. For rapid movement of soldiers, a tunnel continued along the bottom of the wall towards the tower gate. This tunnel surrounded the city on the northern side.

== Gallery ==
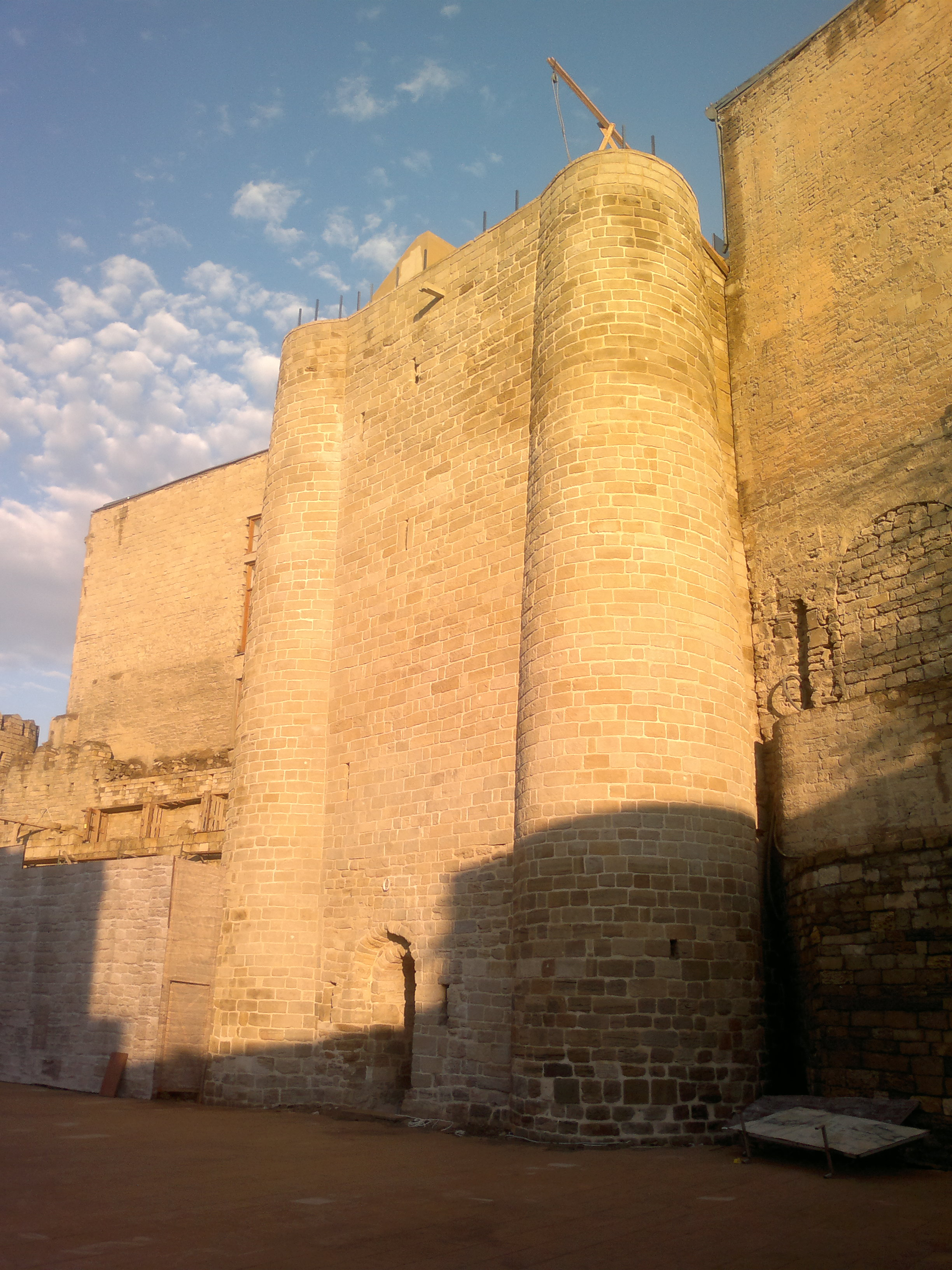

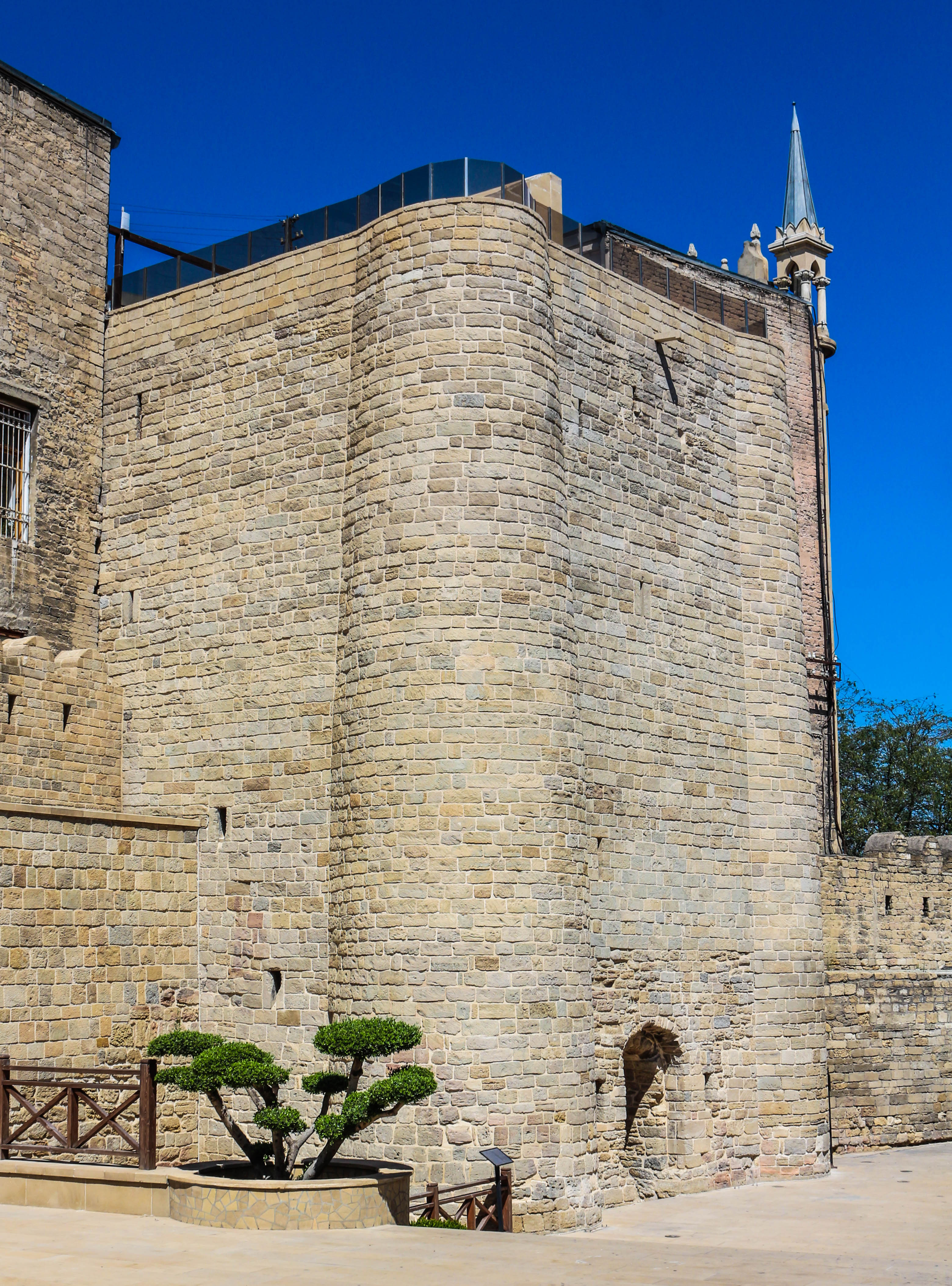

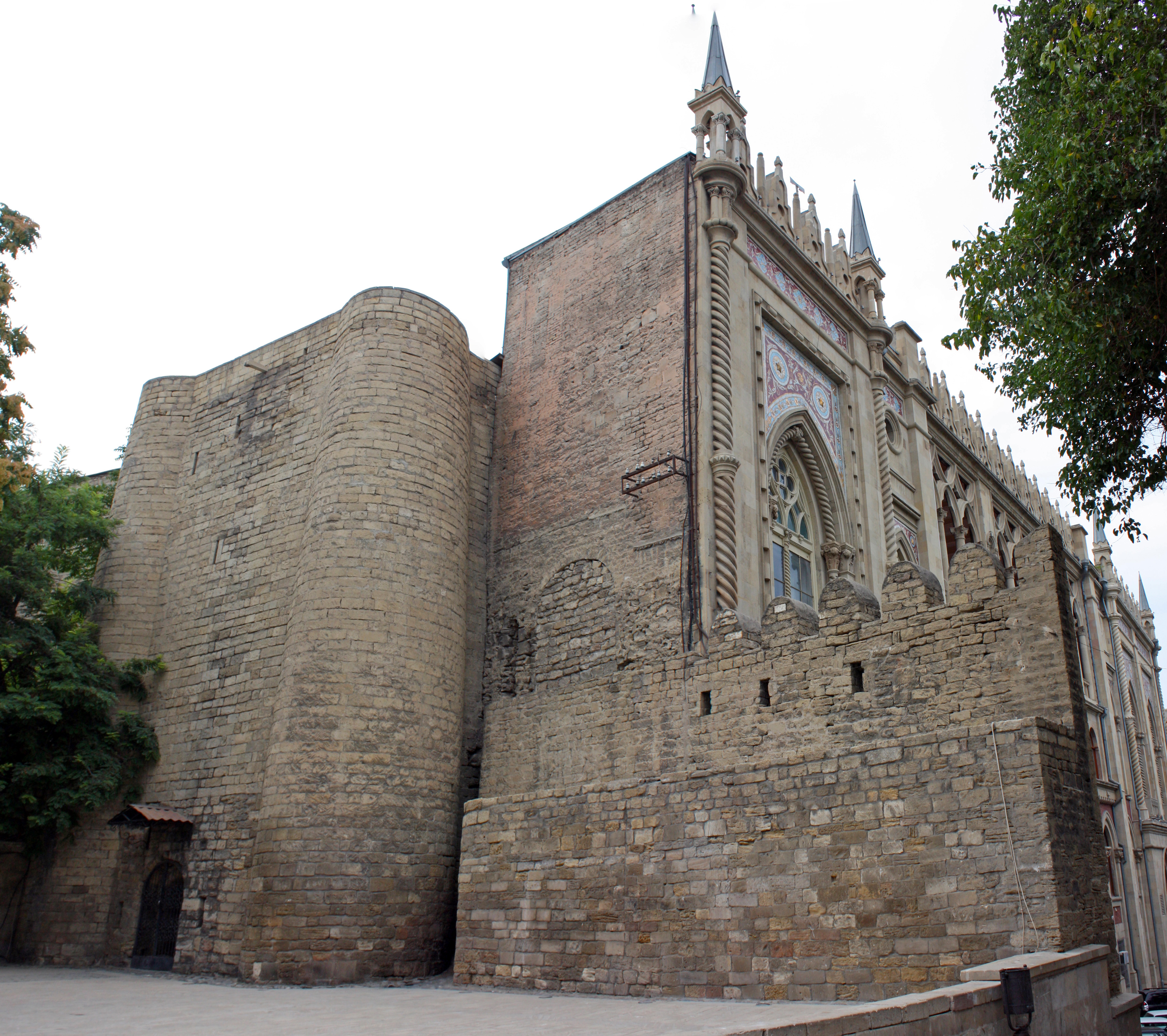

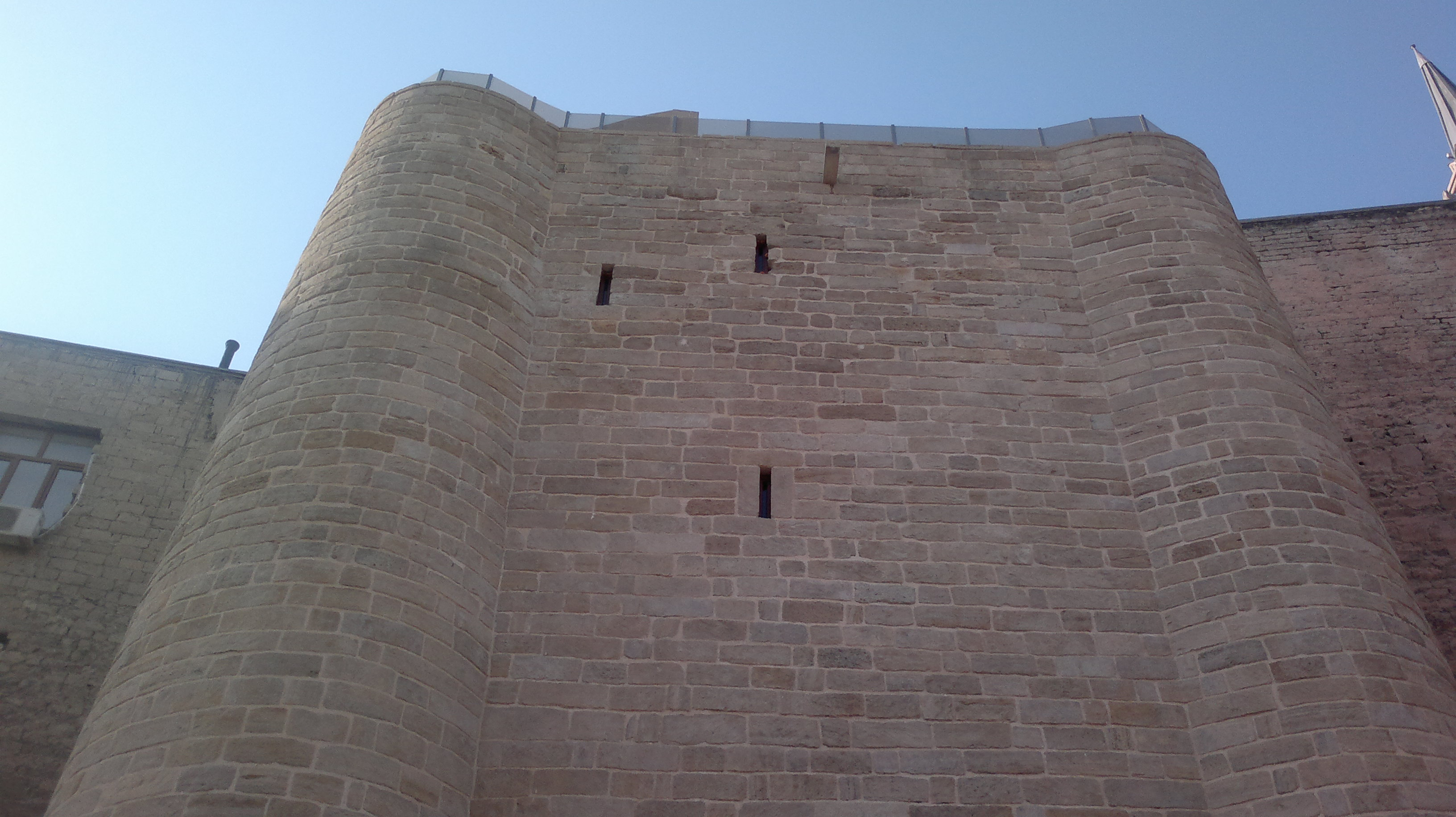

== See also ==
- Old City (Baku)
