= Salyan Gates =

- Azerbaijani: Salyan qapısı
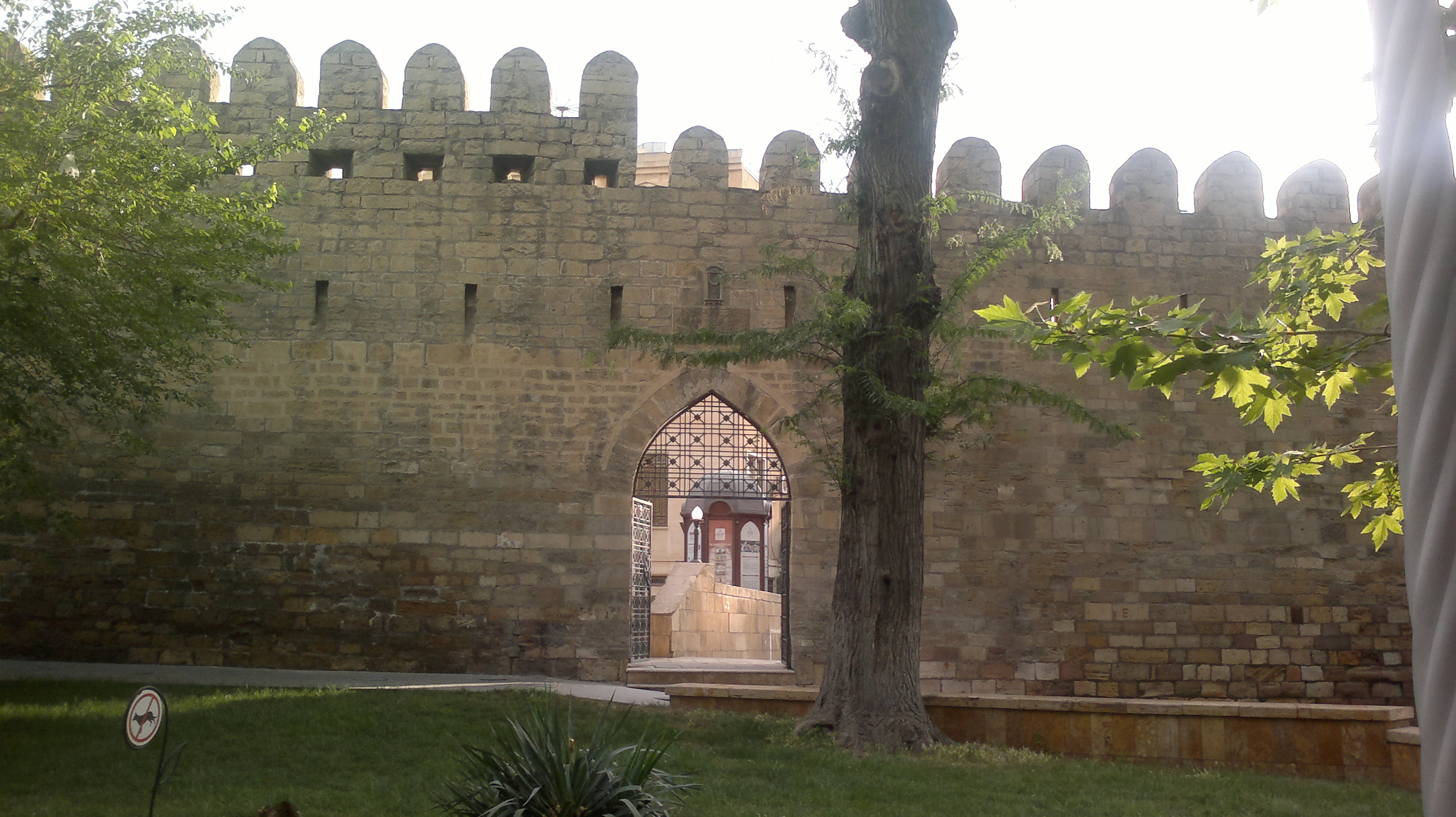
- Location: Old City, Baku, Azerbaijan
- Coordinates: 40°21′50″N 49°49′59″E
- Type: Fortress gate

The Salyan Gates (Azerbaijani: Salyan qapısı) are the gates located in the south-west of the fortress walls of Baku, in a garden near Azneft.

== History ==
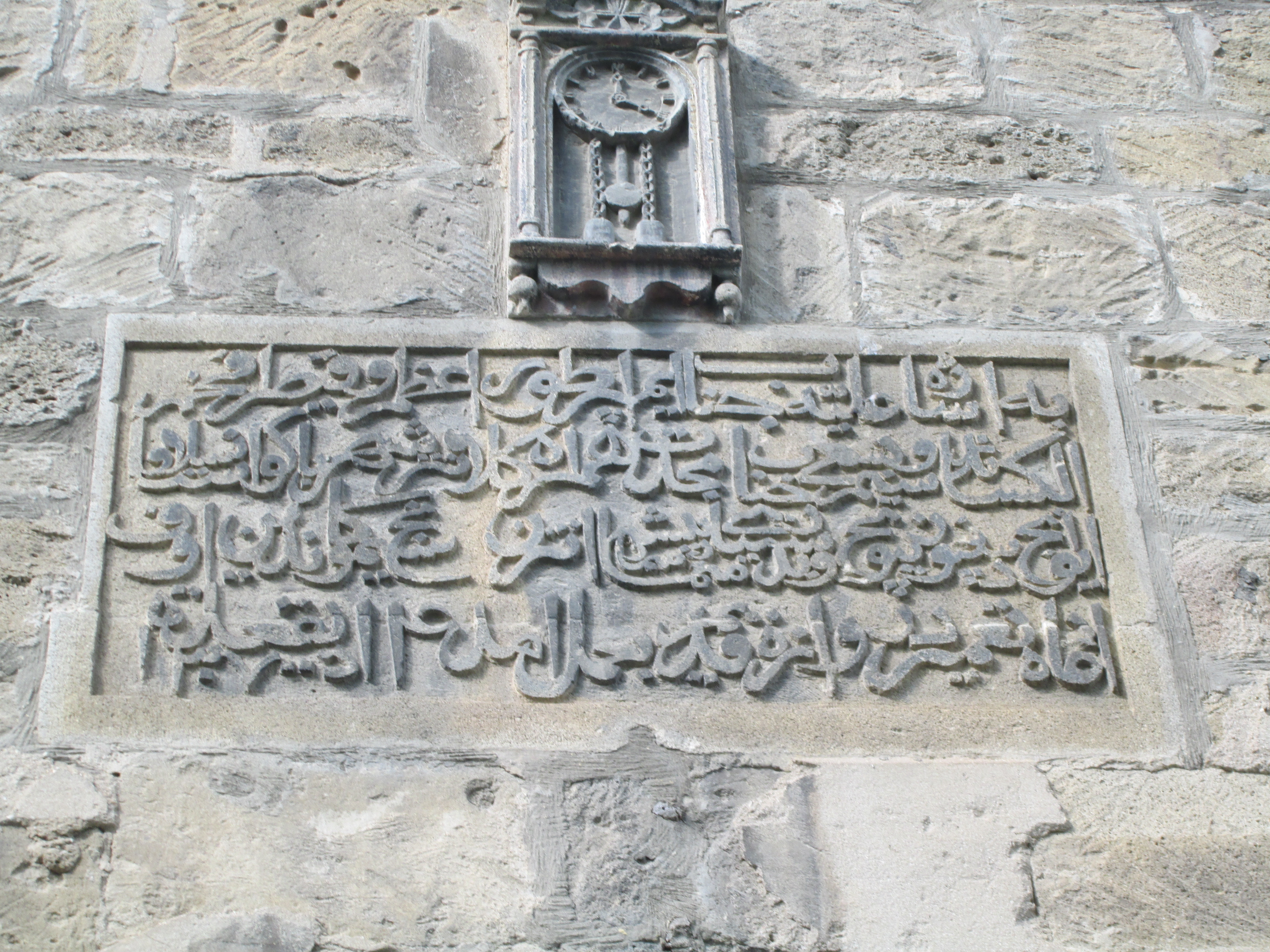
The inscription on the Salyan gates

The Kempfers book describes that, in 1683, Icherisheher was surrounded by two fortress walls and had two city gates: Mountain (also called Gilan, Russian or Salyan) and Shamakhy (also called the Derbend Gates, the pair of fortress gates).

Also, in the primary plan of the city of Baku, which was drawn up by the Russian army in 1723, two city gates were marked.

The trade caravans arriving from Russia passed through the Shamakhy Gates and left through the Salyan Gates. The trade caravans arriving from Iran entered through the Salyan Gates and left through the Shamakhy Gates.

== See also ==
- Baku Khans' Palace
- Paired Fortress Gates
- Underground Bath
