= Paired Fortress Gates =

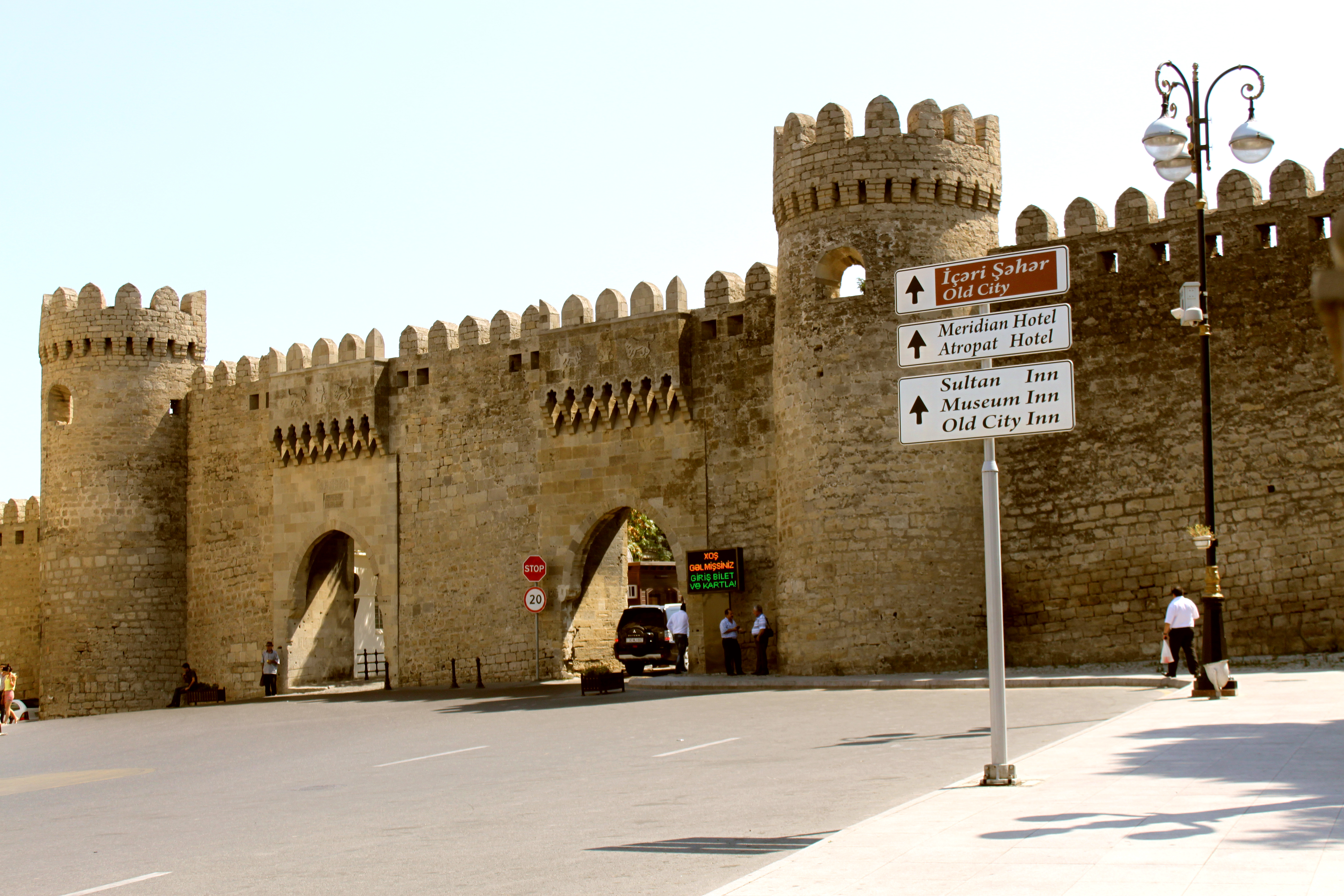
Gosha Gala Gapysy

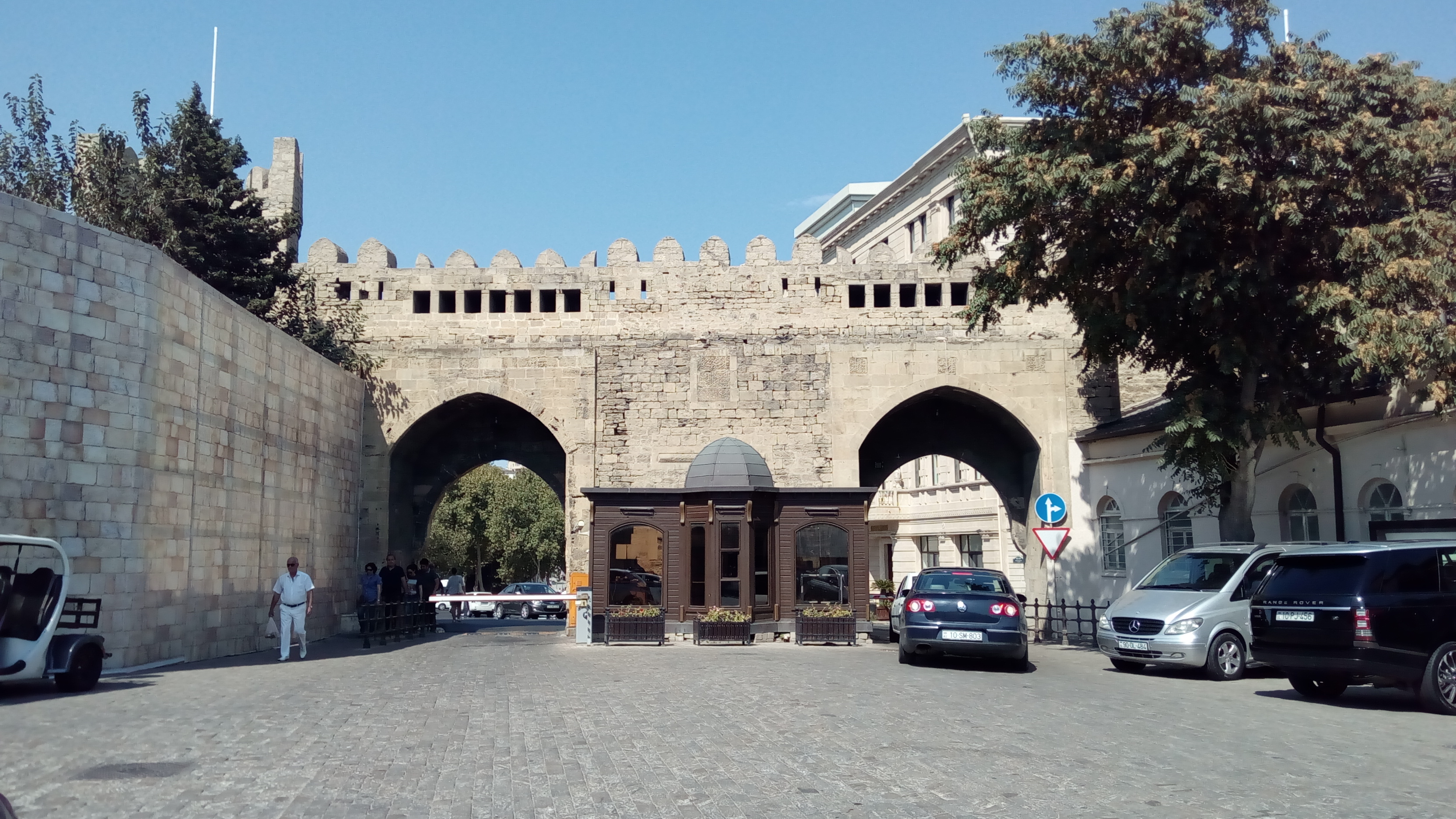
Paired Fortress Gates

The Paired Fortress Gates or Gosha Gala Gapysy (also sometimes called Shamakhi gates and The gates of Shah Abbas) are one of the main entrances to the Icherisheher section of Baku, Azerbaijan. Until the end of the 19th century, the Shamakhi Gates had been the only entry to the fortress.

After the second row of fortification walls was demolished in the late 19th century, the gates of the second row (called “Gates of Zulfugar Khan”) were moved next to the Shamakhi Gates. Since then, the Gates have been referred to as “Paired Fortress Gates”.
