= Eldaniz Zeynalov =

Eldəniz Zeynalov
- Born: Eldəniz Məmməd oğlu Zeynalov; January 1, 1937; Baku, Azerbaijani SSR, USSR
- Died: November 5, 2001 (aged 64); Baku, Azerbaijan
- Education: Azerbaijan State University of Culture and Arts
- Occupation(s): Actor, director,
- Years active: 1963–2001
- Children: 3

Eldaniz Zeynalov (Azerbaijani: Eldəniz Zeynalov; January 1, 1937 – November 5, 2001) was an Azerbaijani film, television and theater actor. He was famous mostly for his comedy roles.

== Career ==
Zeynalov was born in Baku, Azerbaijan. He graduated from the Azerbaijan State University of Culture and Arts. He started his career after debuting as a painter in the 1963 film "Where is Ahmed?".
