= List of tourist attractions in Baku =

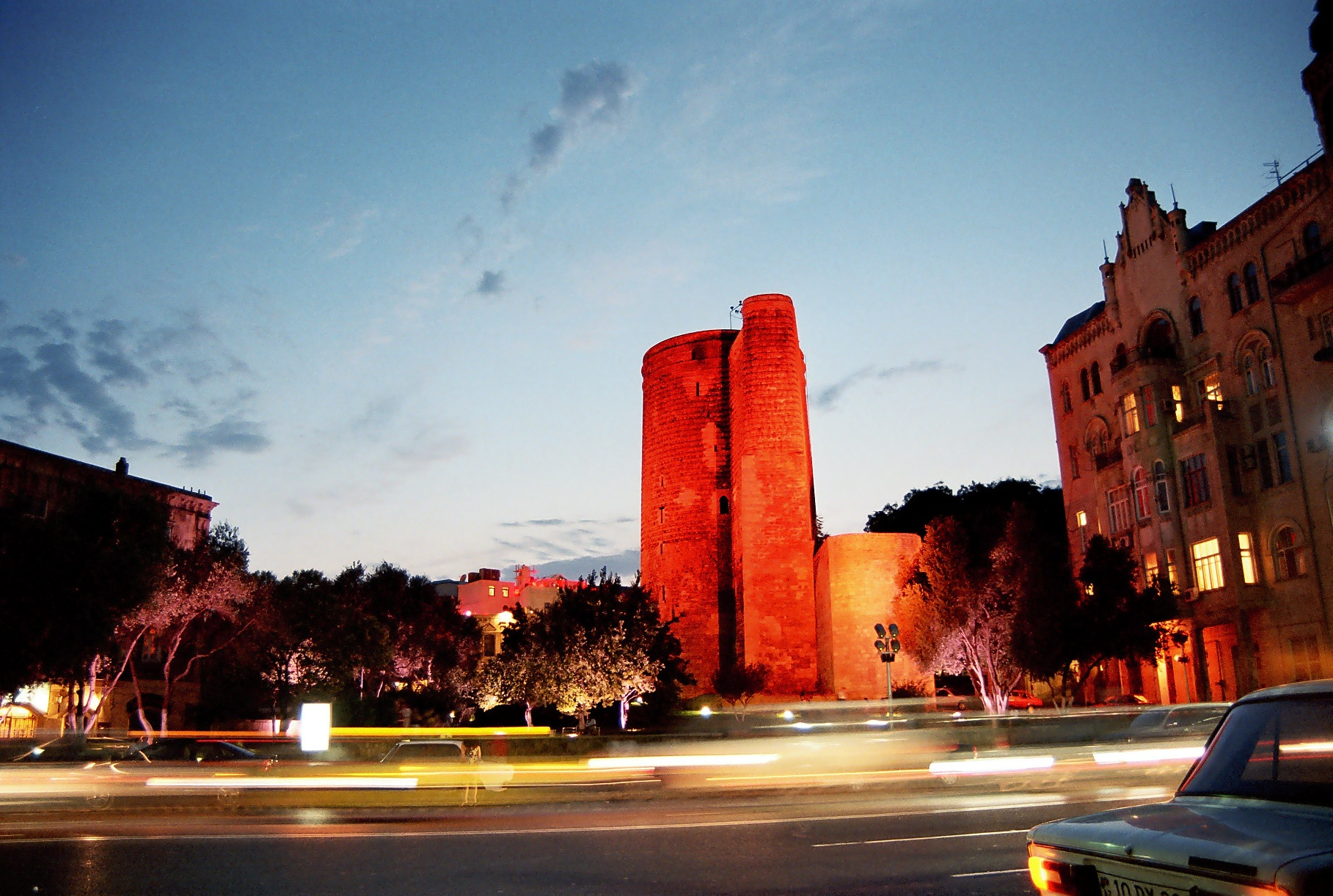
The Maiden Tower, Baku’s most popular tourist attraction.

Baku, the capital of Azerbaijan, receives 2.5 million tourists a year. According to Ilya Umansky, vice president of the Association of Tour Operators of Russia, Baku has become a more popular tourist destination in recent years.

== Tourist attractions ==
=== Theatres ===
Picture	Name	Established	Note
	Azerbaijan State Academic National Drama Theatre	10 March 1873	The academic drama theater located in Baku was named after "Academic" (1959), as well as awarded by the "Red Labor Flag" (1948) and the "Order of Lenin" (1974). There are three actor schools in the academic theater: Romantic Acting school; Realist Acting School; Lyric-psychological style acting school.
	Azerbaijan State Academic Opera and Ballet Theatre	28 February 1911	The Theatre was founded in 1920 as the United State Theater. Since 1924 the opera troupe has left this theater and operates independently with Opera and Ballet Theater (with Azerbaijani and Russian divisions).
	Azerbaijan State Russian Drama Theatre named after Samad Vurghun	1937	The theater operated under the name of Free promotion – critique theatre in 1920-1923 and under the name of Baku Workers' Theater in 1923–1937. In 1937, it was renamed the Azerbaijan State Russian Drama Theater. It was named after Samed Vurgun in 1956.
	Azerbaijan State Puppet Theatre named after Abdulla Shaig	1931	Azerbaijan State Puppet Theater - was created in 1931 for children in Baku. In some years (1931–1941; 1946–1950) It operated as an independent theater, and it operated as Azerbaijan State Theater of Young Spectators during 1941–1946 years, and it has been operated under the Azerbaijan State Philharmonic Hall since 1950. It is an independent theater since 1965.
	Azerbaijan State Musical Theatre	1982	Azerbaijan national musical comedy genre was founded in the early 20th century. The creator of this genre is Uzeyir Hajibeyov. His first performance of the comedy "Husband and wife", written in 1909, was held in the circus building of the Nikitin brothers in Baku on May 24, 1910.
	Azerbaijan State Pantomime Theatre	1994	The theatre was established by the decree of the Minister of Culture of Azerbaijan on May 16, 1994, and operates under the Azerbaijan State Theater of Young Spectators.
	State Song Theatre named after Rashid Behbudov	1968	The Azerbaijan State Song Theater named after Rashid Behbudov was created in 1968 by representative of vocal art, USSR People's Artist Rashid Behbudov.
	Azerbaijan State Theatre of Young Spectators	1928	The Baku Children's Theater was founded on the basis of dramatic drama associations of pioneers and schoolchildren on March 15, 1927.
	Azerbaijan State Theatre "Yuğ"	1989	
	"Üns" Theatre	2006	

=== Cinemas ===
Picture	Name	Established	Notes
	Nizami Cinema Center	1940	The cinema building founded in 1940, was rebuilt under the Order of the President of Azerbaijan "On the Development of Cinema Art in Azerbaijan". After reconstruction, the building was restarted on November 24, 2011.
	CinemaPlus		"CinemaPlus" is a network of cinemas operating in Azerbaijan that consists of 6 cinemas, 31 screens, and 3134 seats.
	Park Cinema	2010	The network of Park cinema is located in Park Bulvar, Metro Park, Zagulba Shopping Center, Flame Towers, Amburan entertainment complex, as well as in Masalli.

=== Concert Halls ===
Picture	Name	Established
	Heydar Aliyev Palace	14 December 1972
	Azerbaijan State Philharmonic named after Muslim Magomayev	1912
	Baku Crystal Hall	August 2011 - April 2012
	International Mugham Center	29 December 2008
	Green Theatre	1960s
	Heydar Aliyev Sports and Concert Complex	1989
	Baku Jazz Center	2002
	Buta Palace	2006

=== Parks ===
Picture	Name	Established
	Baku Boulevard — Seaside Park	March 26, 1909
	Central Park	2019
	Winter boulevard	2013
	Khojaly Park	2007
	Fountains Square	1868
	Khagani Garden	
	Philharmonic Garden	1830
	Upland Park	1998
	Izmir Park	
	Archaeological Park	
	Aliagha Vahid Garden	
	Officers Park	
	Sahil Park	
	Samed Vurgun Garden	
	Zarifa Aliyeva Park	
	Richard Sorge Park	
	Dede Gorgud Park	
	Shalala Park	
	Huseyn Javid Park	
	Mirza Alakbar Sabir Garden	1922
	Central Botanical Garden	
	Mardakan Arboretum	
	Nizami Square	
	Square "White Lilies"	
	Presidential Park	
	Akhundov Garden	

=== Museums ===
Picture	Name	Established
	National Museum of History of Azerbaijan	1920
	National Art Museum of Azerbaijan	1936
	Azerbaijan Carpet Museum	1967
	National Museum of Azerbaijani Literature named after Nizami Ganjavi	1939
	Azerbaijan State Museum of Musical Culture	1967
	Azerbaijan State Theatre Museum named after Jafar Jabbarly	1934
	Museum of Independence of Azerbaijan	1919
	Baku Museum of Modern Art	2009
	House-Museum of Leopold and Mstislav Rostropovich	1998
	Nobel Brothers’ Museum (Villa Petrolea)	1882
	Natural History Museum named after Hasanbey Zardabi	
	Azerbaijan State Agriculture Museum	1924

=== Reserves ===
Picture	Name	Established	Note
	Maiden Tower Museum Complex	11th century	Icherisheher State Historical-Architectural Reserve
	Palace of the Shirvanshahs	15th-century	Icherisheher State Historical-Architectural Reserve
	Muhammad Mosque	11th century	Icherisheher State Historical-Architectural Reserve
	Paired Fortress Gates		Icherisheher State Historical-Architectural Reserve
	Arch-shaped Religious Architectural Complex		Icherisheher State Historical-Architectural Reserve
	Bukhara Caravanserai	15th century	Icherisheher State Historical-Architectural Reserve
	Multani Caravanserai	14th century	Icherisheher State Historical-Architectural Reserve
	Small Caravanserai	12th century	Icherisheher State Historical-Architectural Reserve
	Ashura Mosque	1169	Icherisheher State Historical-Architectural Reserve
	Juma Mosque (Baku)	1899	Icherisheher State Historical-Architectural Reserve
	Haji Banu Bath	15th century	Icherisheher State Historical-Architectural Reserve
	Gasim bey Bath	17th century	Icherisheher State Historical-Architectural Reserve
	Agha Mikayil Bath	18th century	Icherisheher State Historical-Architectural Reserve
	Baku Museum of Miniature Books	April 2, 2002	Icherisheher State Historical-Architectural Reserve
	Museum of Archaeology and Ethnography	1976	Icherisheher State Historical-Architectural Reserve
	House-Museum of Vagif Mustafazadeh	1989	Icherisheher State Historical-Architectural Reserve
	Gobustan –National State Historical Artistic Reserve	1966	
	Gala- State Historical Ethnographic Reserve		
	Ateshgah- the Temple of Fire- Worshipers		
	Yanardag- Burning Mountain		
	Quadrangular Mardakan Fortress	14th century	
framless	Ramana Tower	12th century	
	Nardaran Fortress	14th century	
	Shaghan Castle	12th century	
	Round Mardakan Fortress	13th century	
	Absheron's stone roads	3rd-2nd millennia BCE	

=== Galleries ===
Picture	Name	Established
	Heydar Aliyev Center	10 May 2012
	Baku Expo Center	June, 2010
	Center of Contemporary Art	
	Art Group	
	Yarat Exhibition Center	
	Yay Art Gallery	
	“Kukla” Art Gallery	
	Qiz Qalasi Gallery	
	Art Villa	
	Yeni Gallery	
	Gallery 1969	
	Baku Art Gallery	
	Absheron Art Gallery	
	Khatai Creativity Center	

== See also ==
- Tourism in Azerbaijan
