= Gasim =

Gasim is a given name used in Central Asia. It may refer to:

== People ==
- Gasim Abdullayev, (1873 – 1927), Azerbaijani khananda
- Gasim bey Hajibababeyov (1811 – 1874), Azerbaijani architect
- Gasim bey Zakir (died 1857), Azerbaijani poet

== Places ==
- Gasim bey Bath, Baku, Azerbaijan
- 1596 name of Ghasm, Syria
