= From Waste to Art Museum =

Museum in Azerbaijan

"From Waste to Art" Museum
- Established: June 14, 2015
- Location: Sulh Str., Gala Settlement, Khazar District, Baku
- Coordinates: 40°26′21″N 50°10′10″E
- Type: Art museum

The From Waste to Art Museum (Azerbaijani: "Tullantıdan sənətə" muzeyi) is a cultural institution promoting creative reuse of waste materials. Established through the initiative of the Heydar Aliyev Foundation, it is located within the Gala State Historical Ethnographic Reserve, Baku, Azerbaijan. The museum was inaugurated on June 14, 2015.

== History ==
The "From Waste to Art" exhibition was first launched in 2010 as part of the "Clean Gala" pilot project, initiated by the Heydar Aliyev Foundation and executed by Clean City OJSC in Gala village. This project introduced an alternative waste management approach in the area.

Since 2015, the exhibition has become an annual event, showcasing artworks made from everyday waste materials and household items. The exhibition highlights how discarded objects can be transformed into valuable pieces of art, demonstrating the potential for recycling and responsible waste management.

In 2015, the "From Waste to Art" Museum was established within the Gala State Historical and Ethnographic Reserve, providing a permanent space to display works from the exhibition. This museum continues to promote the importance of recycling and creative reuse of waste materials in art.

== Ideological background ==
Each year, large quantities of waste, including plastic containers, polyethylene bags, and batteries, are discarded by individuals, posing significant environmental threats. These materials are considered hazardous not only in the present day but also for future generations, potentially causing problems for up to 100 to 300 years. In response to this growing concern, various waste management initiatives and new approaches are being implemented worldwide, including in Azerbaijan.

The "From Waste to Art" Museum, established in 2015 through the efforts of the Heydar Aliyev Foundation and Clean City OJSC, within the Gala State Historical and Ethnographic Reserve, serves as an example of this approach. The museum promotes the concept of transforming waste into creative resources, showcasing the potential of discarded materials in producing valuable art.

The majority of the museum's exhibits were created as part of the International "From Waste to Art" exhibitions, which have been held since 2012. The museum currently displays nearly 180 works, created from various discarded materials, such as plastic bottles, polyethylene bags, children's toys, car parts, and cigarette butts. These works illustrate how waste materials can be repurposed into art, raising awareness of environmental issues while highlighting the creative potential of repurposed materials.

The museum features contributions from local artists as well as those from over 46 countries, fostering international participation and promoting global awareness of sustainability and waste management practices.

== International exhibitions ==
On June 14, 2015, the IV International "Waste to Art" Exhibition and the "Waste to Art" Museum opened at the "Qala" State Historical and Ethnographic Reserve in Azerbaijan. The exhibition featured 23 artists from 17 countries, showcasing artworks made from household waste. It was organized by the "Clean City" ASC with the support of the Heydar Aliyev Foundation, IDEA Public Union, "Icherisheher" State Historical-Architectural Reserve, and "Q Gallery." The exhibition aimed to raise awareness about waste management and promote a responsible approach to waste.

The Fifth International "From Waste to Art" Exhibition opened on October 2, 2016, at the Gala State Historical and Ethnographic Reserve, organized by the Heydar Aliyev Foundation and partners. Featuring artworks made from discarded materials, the exhibition has showcased works by over 80 artists from 30 countries over five years. The aim is to raise awareness about environmental responsibility and the creative potential of waste.

Notable pieces include "Qarabağ Pegasus" by Mammad Rashidov and "Soft Paws" by Tatyana Gomzan.

The Sixth International "From Waste to Art" Exhibition opened on October 10, 2017, at the Gala State Historical and Ethnographic Reserve. Organized by the Heydar Aliyev Foundation and partners, the exhibition featured artworks made from household waste and discarded items. This year, 25 artists from 9 countries participated, with over 140 artists from 36 countries having contributed over five years. The exhibition continues to promote environmental awareness and the creative transformation of waste.

The IX International "From Waste to Art" exhibition took place on May 27, 2024, in Baku, organized by the Heydar Aliyev Foundation and supported by Temiz Sheher OJSC, the IDEA Public Association, the Office of the State Historical and Architectural Reserve 'Icherisheher', and the Q Gallery art gallery. The exhibition showcased works by 12 foreign and 18 local artists from nine countries, using waste and discarded items to create art. It aimed to raise awareness about environmental protection and the transformative potential of waste materials.
