= Qala, Azerbaijan =

Qala
- Municipality
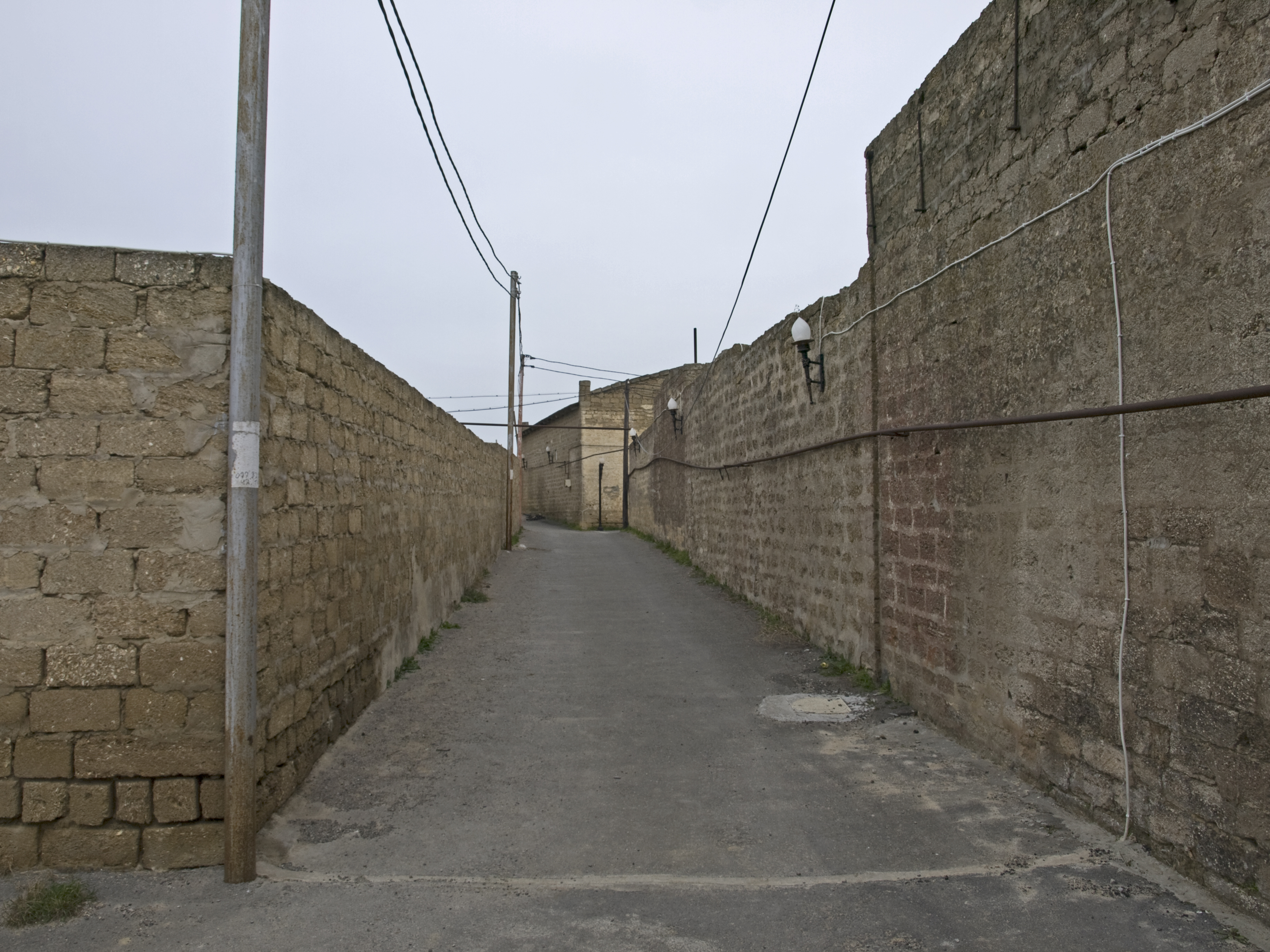
- A street in Qala

- Location within Azerbaijan
- Coordinates: 40°26′25″N 50°10′34″E
- Country: Azerbaijan
- City: Baku
- Raion: Azizbeyov

Area
  - Total: 82.04 km^{2} (31.68 sq mi)

Population (2020)
  - Total: 5,232
- Time zone: UTC+4 (AZT)
  - Summer (DST): UTC+5 (AZT)

Qala (also, Gala and Kala-Machtagi) is a settlement and municipality in Khazar raion, Baku, Azerbaijan. As of 2020, it has a population of 5,232.

Gala State Historical Ethnographic Reserve is located in Qala.

== History ==
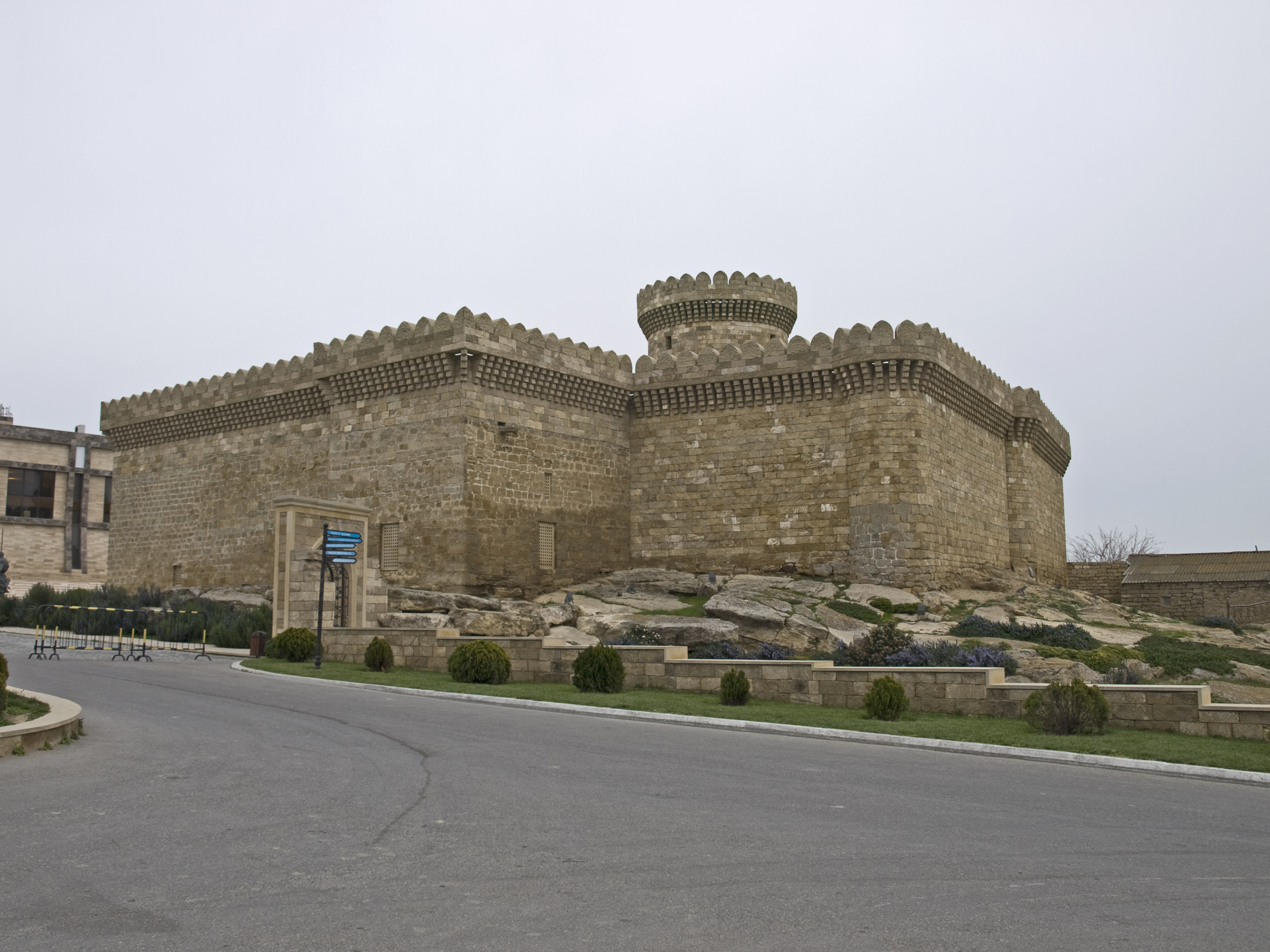
Qala Fortress side

The name of the village of Qala comes from the Azerbaijani term qala, meaning "fortress". At first glance, such a simple explanation of the toponym is based on historical and archaeological facts on the one hand, and folk etymology on the other. Some locals interpret the name of the village as "protected place", in other words, an invincible place, a village. The other part is connected with the literal meaning of the word, ie "fortress".

Historical evidence further confirms the second hypothesis. Thus, the fortifications and observation towers built here in the first half of the 14th and 17th centuries prefer to accept this possibility as true. This fortress, which dates back to the 14th century, was built on a rock at the highest point of the village. Parallel scientific comparisons show that this fortress was built by Mardakan, Şağan, Ramana and others due to its constructive architecture, as well as construction features. belongs to the type of rectangular castles in the villages. According to the elderly residents, there was a basement-like place at the bottom of the castle; Allegedly, about 1000-1500 people were protected here in case of danger. Although this is not clear, the castle was magnificent. Later, when the castle collapsed, a mosque was built in the 17th century on the site of one of the towers. Underground roads and communication systems were found in the yard. The villagers found copper coins of the 14th-15th centuries. The location of the observation tower built in the village during Nadir Shah's war with the Russians is now unknown. Most likely, it was round. By the way, until the second half of the 17th century, the village was called Nadiri-Gala in the sources.

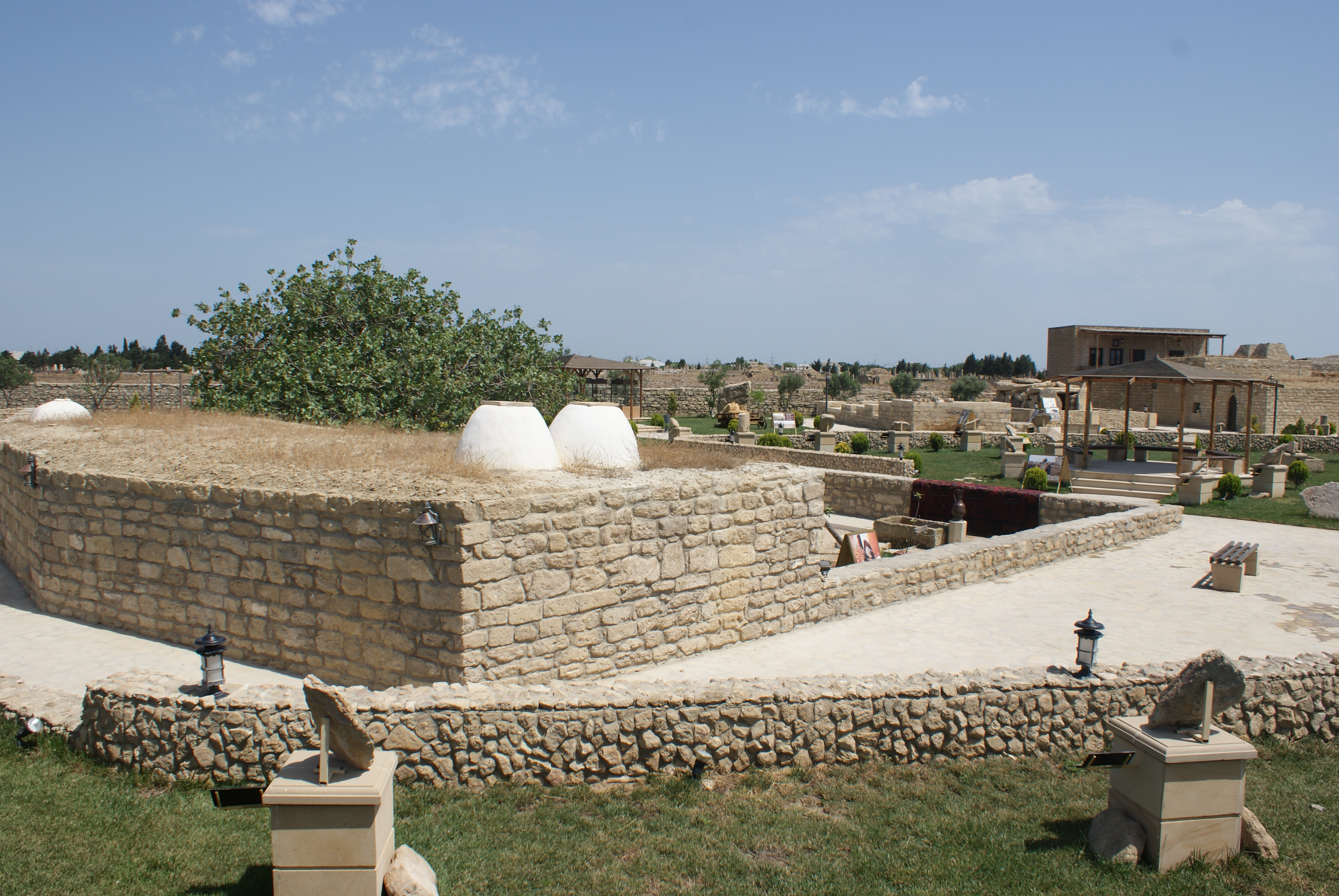
Qala State Historical-Ethnographic Reserve. House with a double-pitched roof.

The former Second Qala, currently part of the Qala settlement in the city of Baku, May 2026.
