= Shirin Su bathhouse =

Historical monument in Shusha

- Azerbaijani: Şirin su hamamı
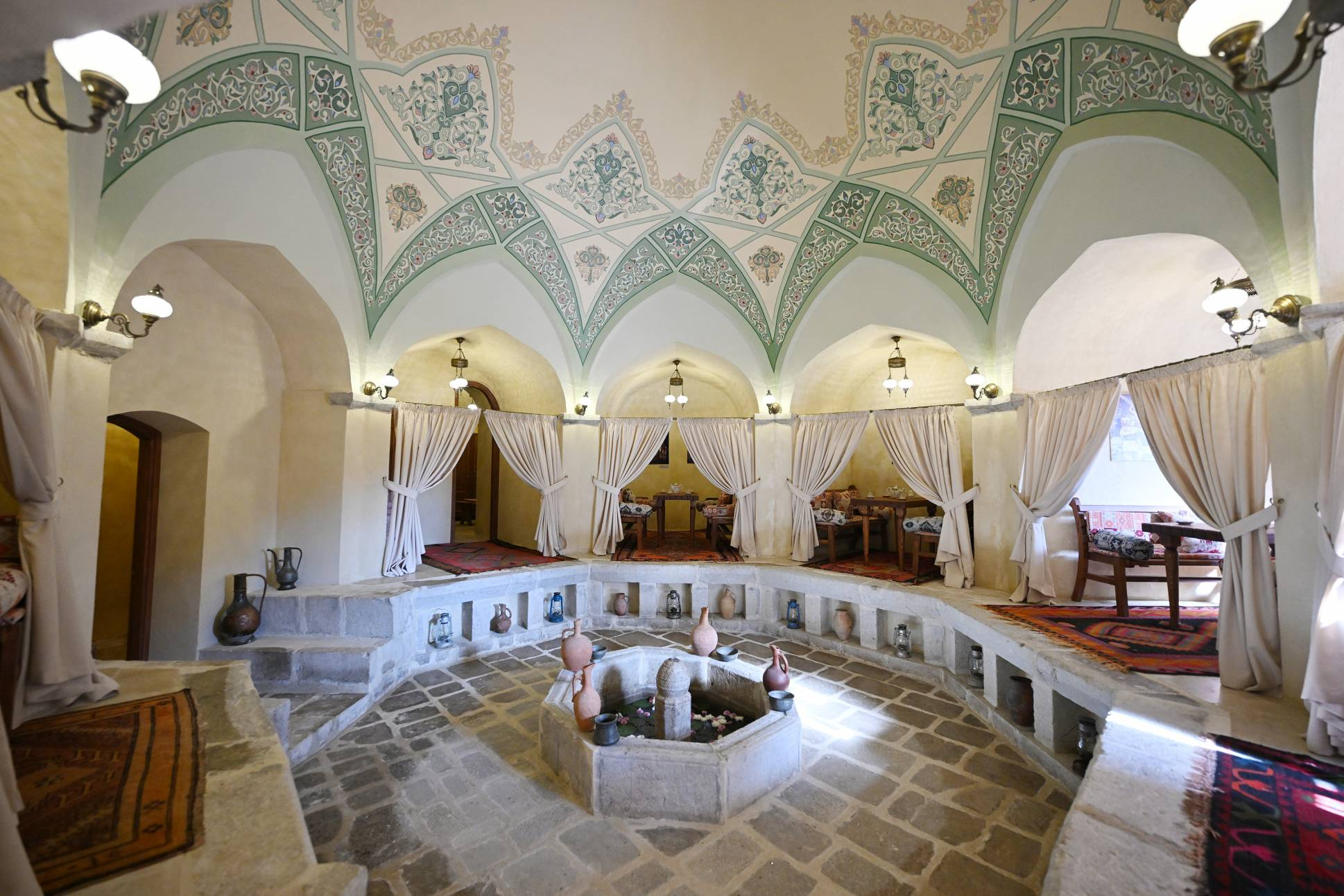
- The interior of the main domed hall of the Shirin Su bathhouse after restoration work in 2024
- Interactive map of Shirin Su bathhouse
- Location: Shusha, Azerbaijan
- Coordinates: 39.7633°N 46.7521°E
- Designer: Karbalayi Safikhan Karabakhi
- Type: bathhouse
- Completion date: 18th century

Shirin Su bathhouse or the Bathhouse of the Fresh Water (Azerbaijani: Şirin su hamamı) is a historical monument located in the city of Shusha, Azerbaijan. It was built in 1878–1880 at the order of Khurshidbanu Natavan by the architect of Kerbelayi Sefikhan Garabaghy. On 2 August 2001, the Cabinet of Ministers of the Republic of Azerbaijan, by the Resolution No. 32, registered it as a historical monument of a republican significance.

== History ==
The Shirin Su bathhouse, one of the Shusha bathhouses, was built at the order of Khurshidbanu Natavan, the daughter of the last Karabakh khan, Mehdigulu Khan Javanshir, in 1878-1880s, by the architect Karbalayi Safikhan Karabakhi. The bath was called "Shirin Su" (fresh water) thanks to the fact that it used drinking water, which was brought to city, back in 1873, by Natavan. The bathhouse served men on the odd days of the week, and women on the even days. It functioned until the city of Shusha got under the control of the Armenian forces. After the end of the Karabakh War, the building of the bathhouse remained intact, however the interior decoration was changed by Armenians. The patterns and the ornaments on the dome and the hall's walls were completely destroyed. A swimming pool, not related to the bathhouse, was built inside.

== See also ==
- Chokak Hamam
- Underground Bath
- Gasim bey Bath
