= İkinci Qala =

- Location within Azerbaijan
- Coordinates: 40°28′38″N 50°05′52″E
- Country: Azerbaijan
- City: Baku
- Time zone: UTC+4 (AZT)
  - Summer (DST): UTC+5 (AZT)

İkinci Qala (also, Qala) is a village in Baku, Azerbaijan. It hosts the Gala- State Historical Ethnographic Reserve and contains a number of buildings classified as historical and architectural monuments.
