= Underground Bath (Baku) =

- Azerbaijani: Yeraltı hamam Persian: حمام زیرزمینی
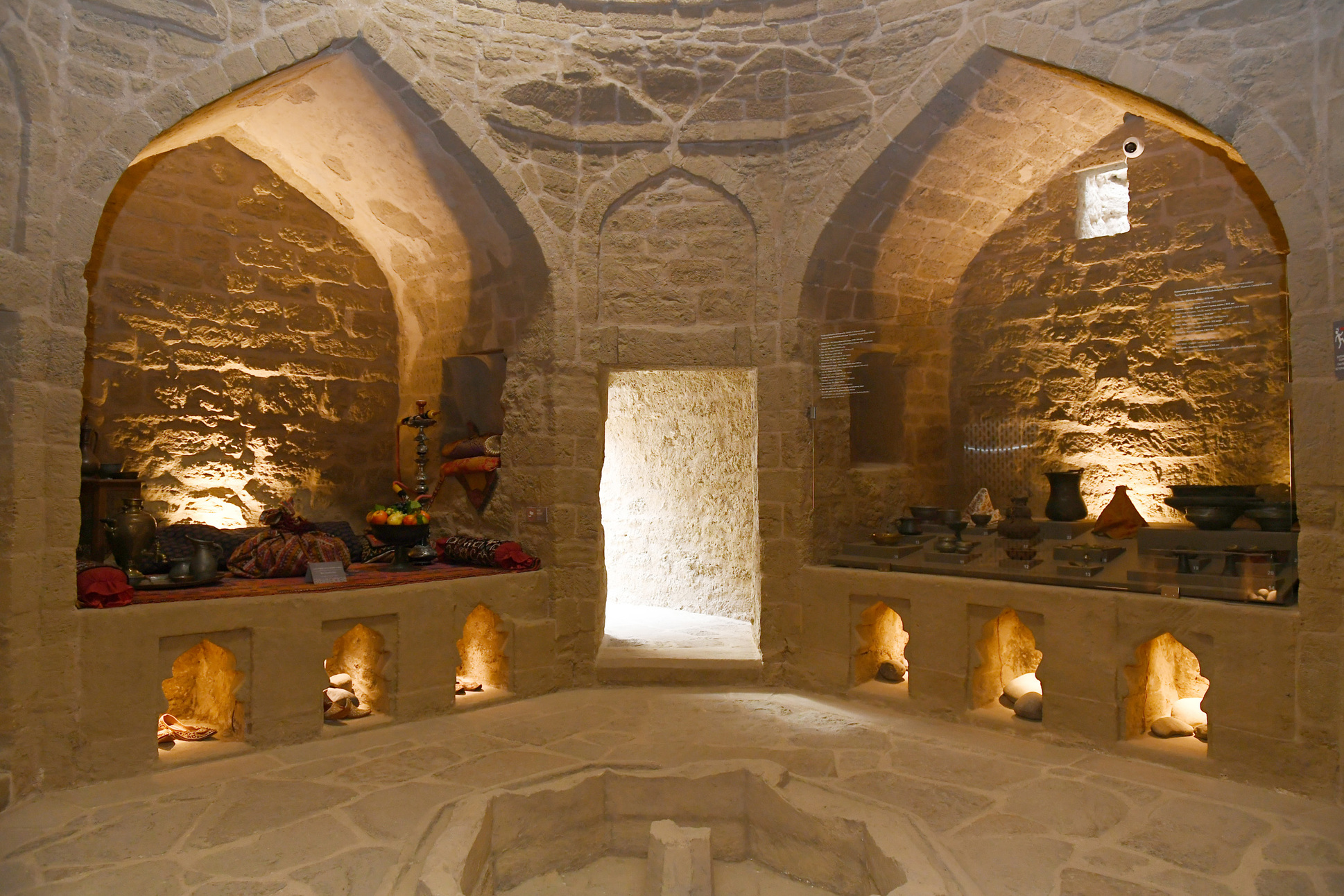

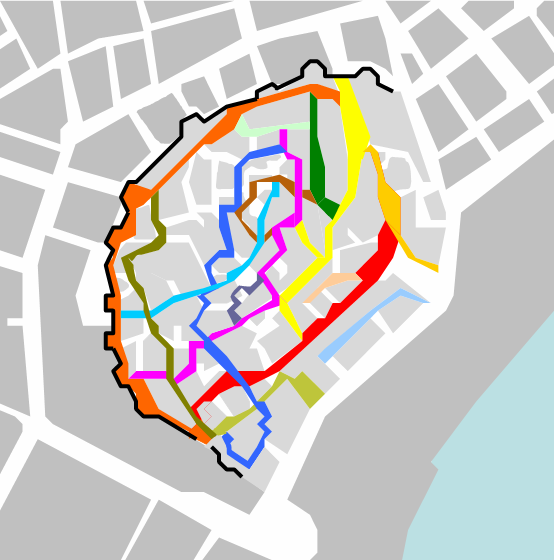
- Location within Streets in Old City, Baku, Azerbaijan

General information
- Type: Bath
- Architectural style: Azerbaijani architecture
- Location: Old City, Baku, Azerbaijan, 50 Boyuk Gala Street
- Completed: 19th century

UNESCO World Heritage Site
- Official name: Walled City of Baku with the Shirvanshahs' Palace and Maiden Tower
- Type: Cultural
- Criteria: iv
- Designated: 2000 (24th session)
- Reference no.: 958
- Region: Asia
- Endangered: 2003–2009

Underground Bath (Azerbaijani: Yeraltı hamam, Persian: حمام زیرزمینی) is a hamam located on the Boyuk Gala Street, near the fortress gates of Icherisheher in Baku.

== Description ==
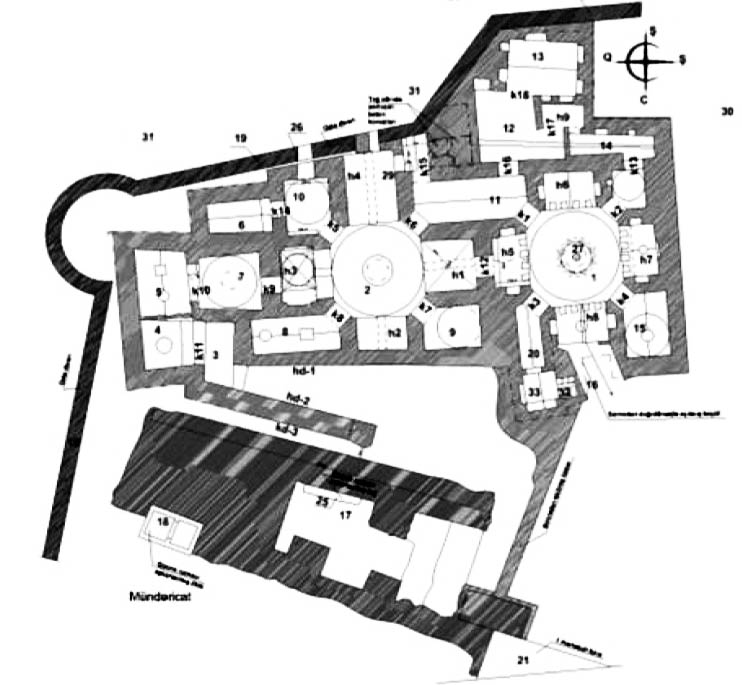
Bath's plan

The baths premises are located below the ground level, which is typical for Baku baths. This helped to maintain a constant temperature regime. On the earth's surface, there were 2 domes with holes allowing the light to access inside. The baths entrance was located in the southern part.

The bath consists of several rooms and two octagonal halls. During the archaeological work, it was assumed that in the first hall, placed at the entrance, the visitors changed their clothes, and that the second hall was a bath space itself.

During the construction, the gulbakh stone was used, one of the types of agglai. For insulation, a clay and limestone based mortar was used.

== History ==
The bath was presumably built at the beginning of the 17th century. During that period, the construction of baths at the entrances to the city was widespread, so that caravans and travellers could wash themselves before entering into the city.

After the conquest of Baku by the Russian troops in 1806, a military commandants office was located on the territory of the bath. The bath itself was covered with earth, and the domes were demolished.

=== Excavation and restoration work ===
A part of the bath was cleaned up in 2015 during the archaeological excavations around the Paired Fortress Gate (Gosha Gala). The entire bath, with the exception of a few rooms with collapsed vaults, remained in relatively good condition, but due to the danger of collapse, the study of the bath continued only after the walls were strengthened in 2016.

During the excavations, lamps, parts of clay jugs, coins of the Baku and Shemakhi khanates and of the Russian Empire, bullets, uniforms buttons and other items related mainly to the 18-20th centuries were discovered. Among those was a bronze body fold with three Orthodox icons. The central icon depicted the Saint Nicholas the Pleasant, others illustrated the Saint Mary, Gregory, Vasily, Sergei and other saints. Some of these findings could have got here along with the land brought for filling the bath.

In 2018–2020, the conservation and restoration work was carried out in the bath. The work was supervised by the Austrian company "Atelier Erich Pummer".

== See also ==
- Underground Bath (Sheki)
- Shirin Su bathhouse
- List of World Heritage Sites in Azerbaijan
