= House-Museum of Vagif Mustafazadeh =

Museum of Vagif Mustafazadeh

- Vaqif Mustafazadənin ev muzeyi
- Established: 1989
- Location: 4 Vagif Mustafazade Lane, Icherisheher, Baku, Azerbaijan
- Collection size: 1214 artifacts
- Director: Afag Agha Rahim gizi Aliyeva

House-museum of Vagif Mustafazadeh (Azerbaijani: Vaqif Mustafazadənin ev muzeyi) is a memorial museum of the Azerbaijani jazz-pianist and composer, Vagif Mustafazadeh, and it was established on July 28, 1989. In 1994, it became a branch of the Azerbaijan State Museum of Musical Culture. From 1989 to 1997, the director of the museum was Zivar Agasaf qizi Aliyeva.

The house-museum consists of three rooms containing 1214 artifacts including photos, posters, gramophone discs, documents, and personal belongings connected with the life and work of Vagif Mustafazade. Vagif Mustafazadeh is the father of Azerbaijani singer and pianist Aziza Mustafa Zadeh.

At present, the museum is led by the musician’s cousin, Afag Agha Rahim gizi Aliyeva. She's also a founder and chairman of the Cultural and Charitable Foundation, named after Vagif Mustafazadeh.
