= Agha Mikayil Bath =

Bath in Old City, Baku, Azerbaijan

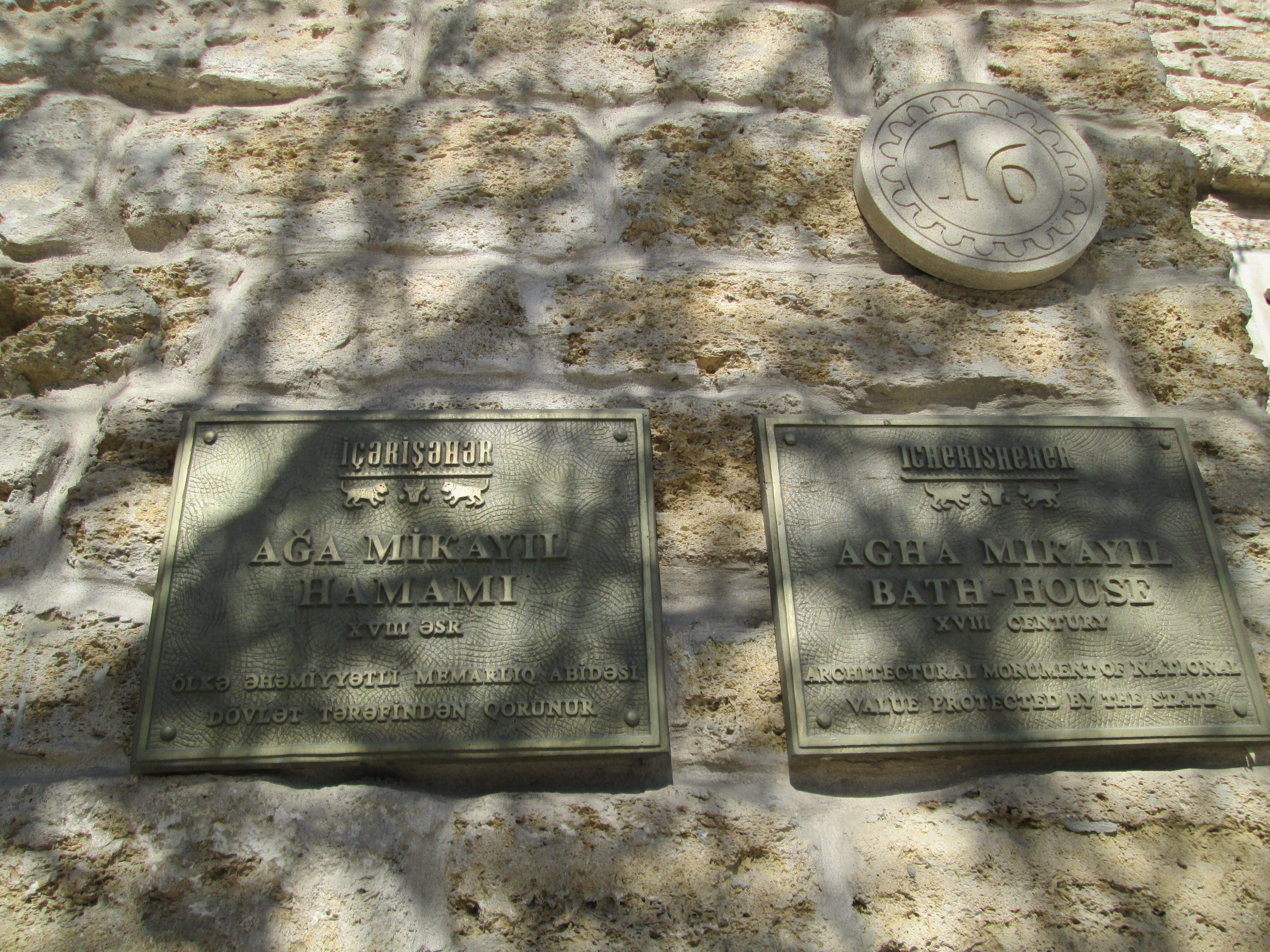
Agha Mikayil Bath's entrance

The Agha Mikayil Bath was erected in the 18th century in the south-western part of the fortress, on one of its main streets, Kichik Gala, Old City where local people frequently call this place the neighborhood of bath amateurs.

It bears the name of Haji Agha Mikayil from Shamakhi, who built it.

== Design ==
It differs from other baths in that it has a large interior and the dressing room and the baths are square. The architectural composition of the structure is articulated in pointed arches and domes, divided into proportional layers.

The bath has a chimney above the building. In 2010, the bath underwent restoration works and remains a functioning bath

== Photo gallery ==
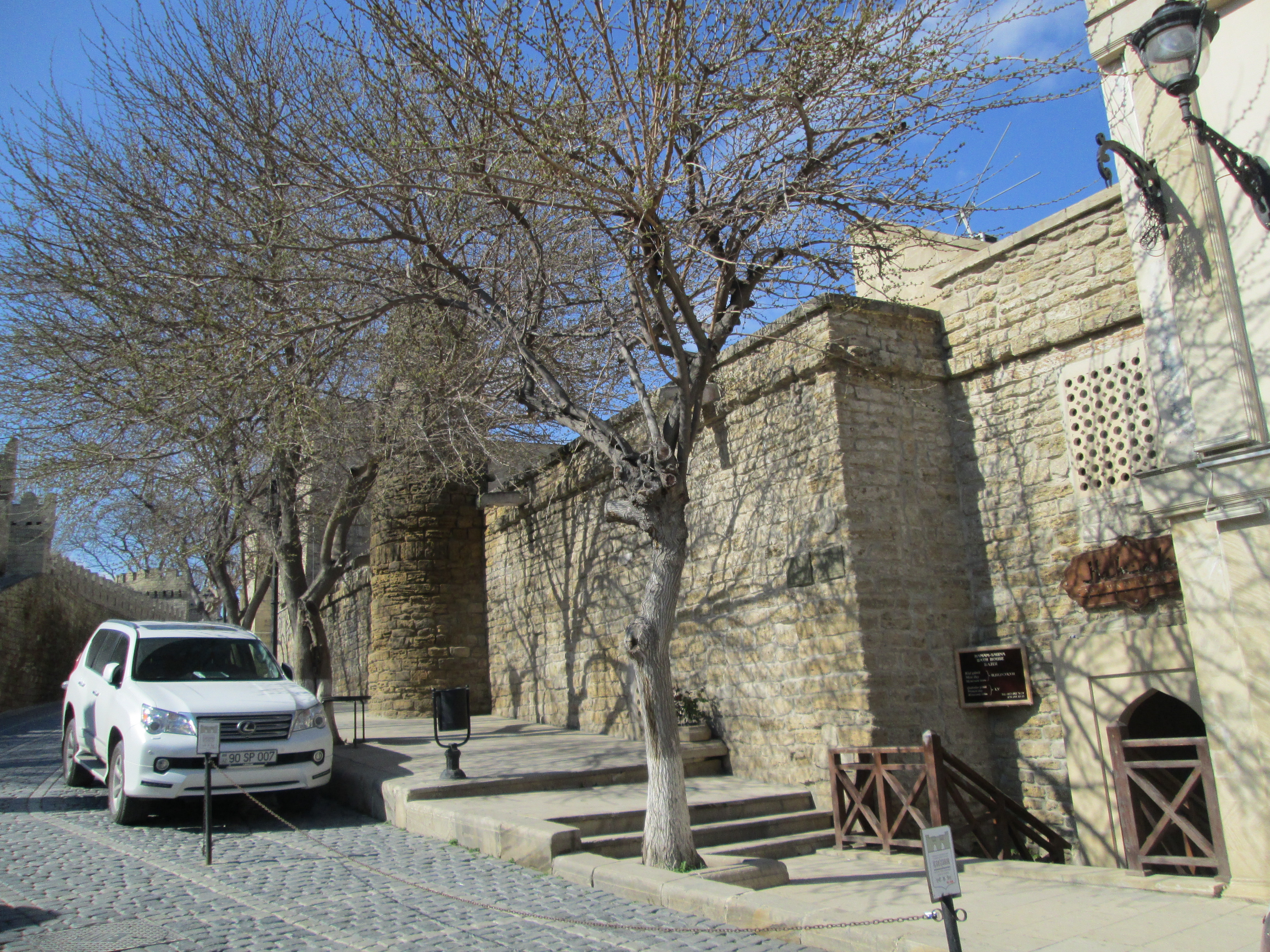
Agha Mikayil Bath

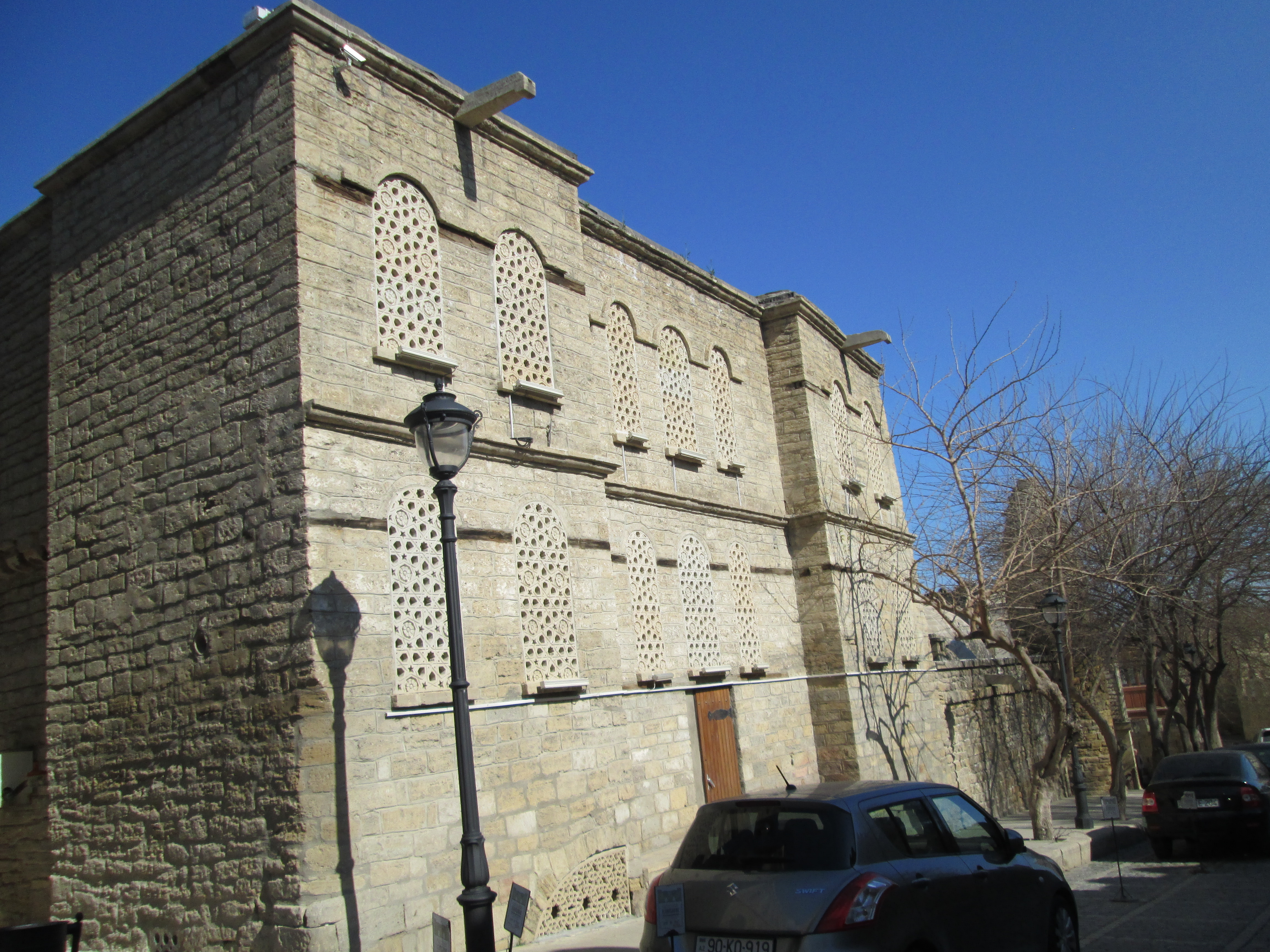
The building of the bath

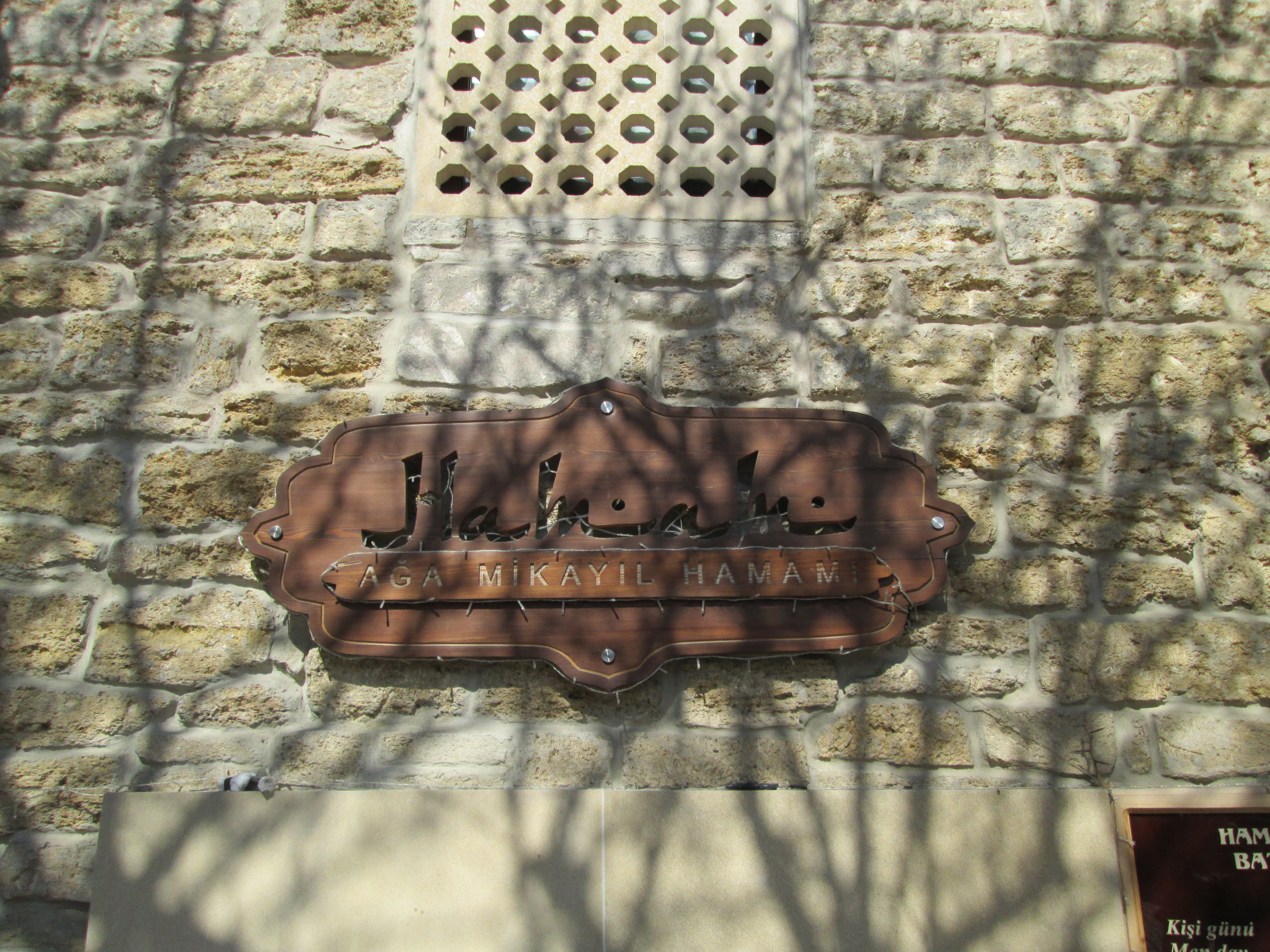
An information desk

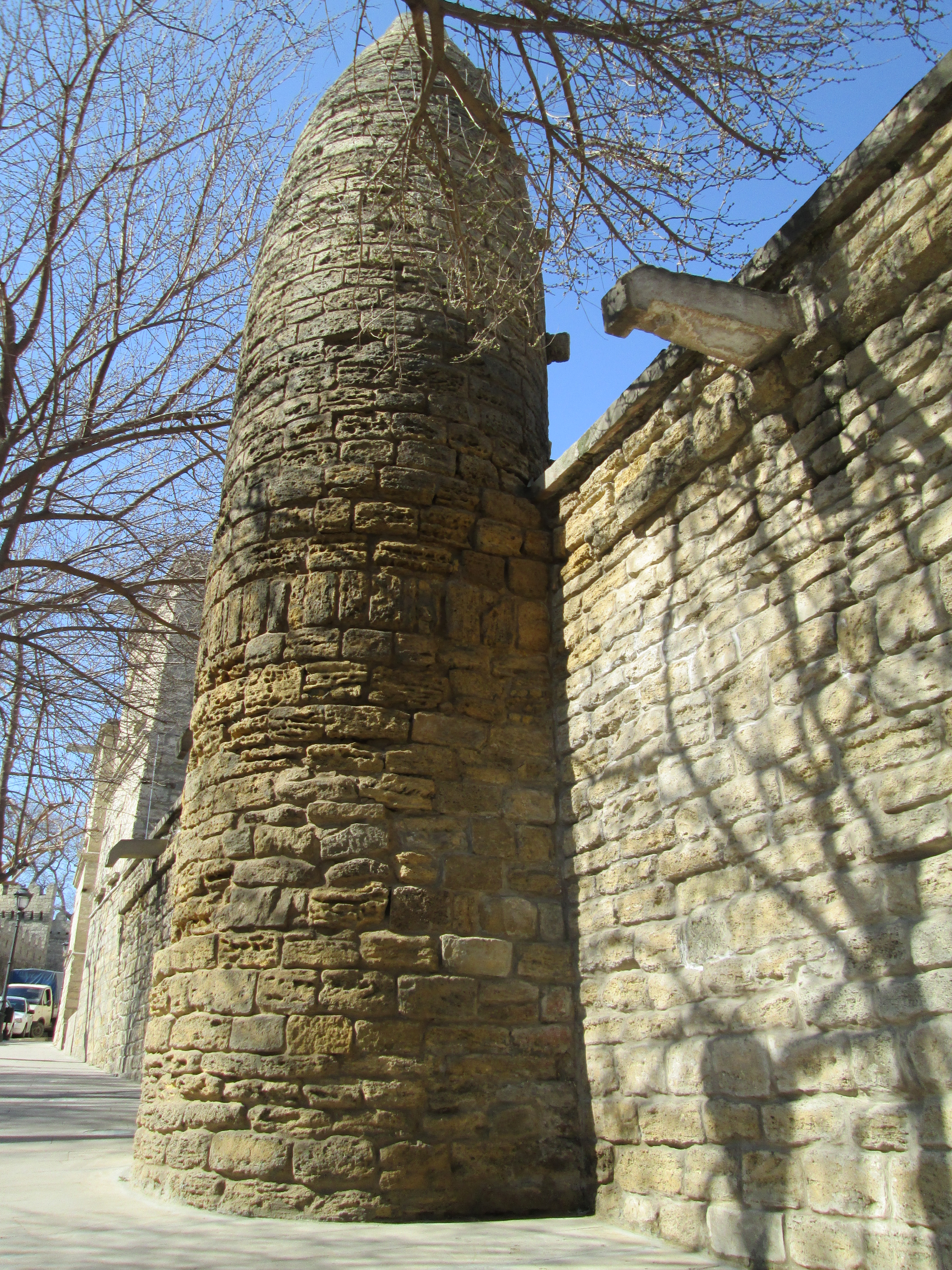
A chimney in the bath
