= Shaghan Castle =

Historic castle

- Azerbaijani: Şağan qalası
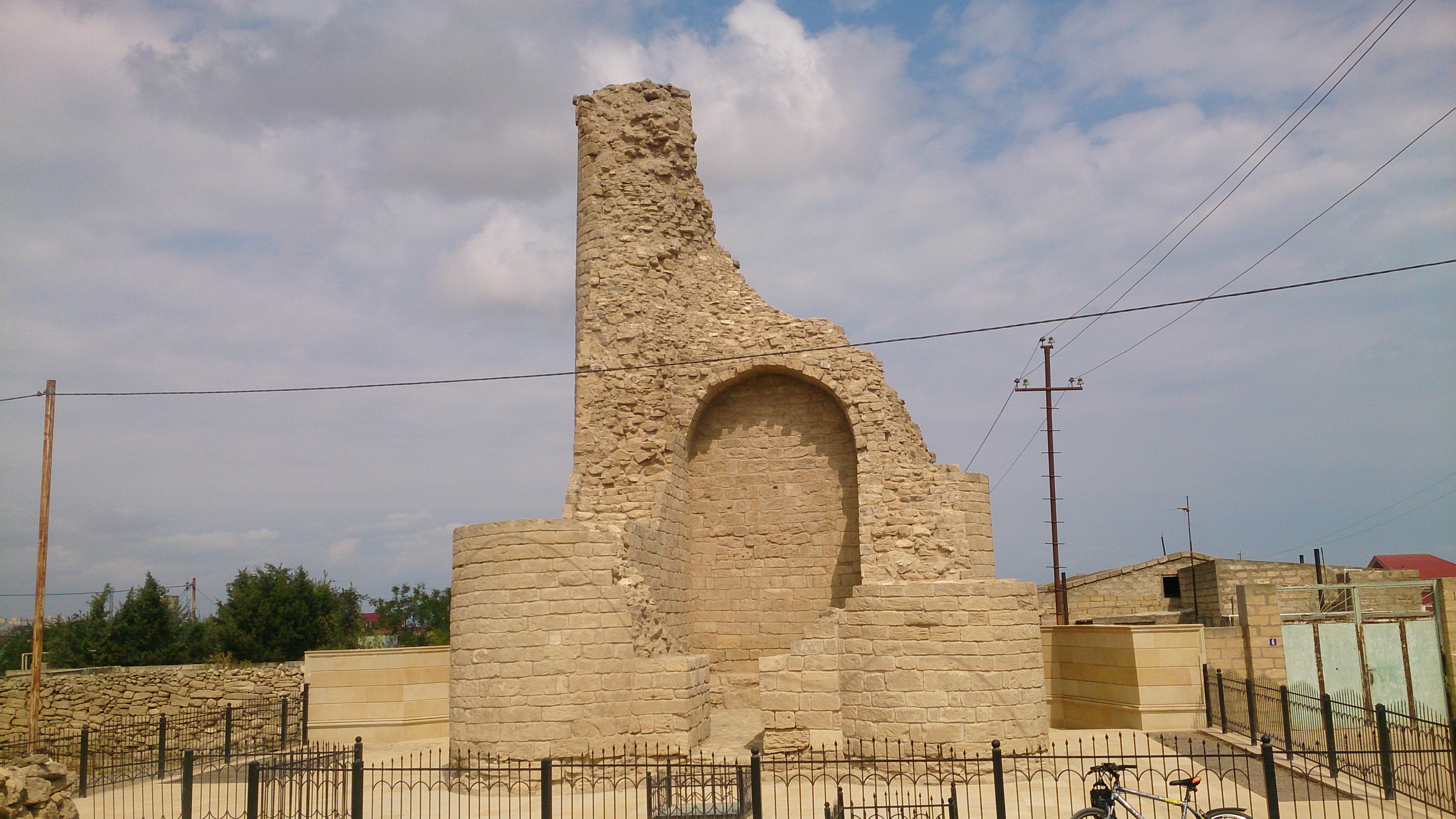

- Location within Azerbaijan

General information
- Architectural style: Architectural school of Shirvan-Absheron
- Location: Şağan, Baku, Azerbaijan
- Coordinates: 40.49751°N 50.12938°E
- Client: XII-XIII centuries

Shaghan Castle is one of the 12th - 13th century Absheron castles located in Shaghan settlement. As a result of a strong earthquake in 1841, most of the castle was destroyed. Currently, only one tower exists.

The castle was included in the list of immovable historical and cultural monuments of national importance by decision No. 132 issued by the Cabinet of Ministers of the Republic of Azerbaijan on August 2, 2001.

In 2001, the Shaghan fortress was included in the UNESCO Reserve list along with other Caspian coastal fortifications.

== History of the castle ==
Shaghan Castle was built in XII-XIII centuries. Like other castles in Absheron, the castle, which was built of white stone, now has a 24-meter high tower. The main reason for the collapse of the monument is the strong earthquake that occurred in 1841. As a result of this earthquake, the Mashtaga fortress, located near the Shaghan fortress, was completely destroyed. In the state of destruction for a long time, the fort was restored only in 2014. During the repair work, the foundations of two stone fences of the fort and several wells were discovered. Shaghan Castle has underground roads like other castles of Absheron. Inside the castle, at first glance, an underground road that resembles a well once led to Mardakan castles. Since the castle was built on a high place of the settlement, it is possible to observe the coast of the sea and the settlement of Mardakan from above.

== See also ==
- Quadrangular castle (Mardakan)
- Round Mardakan Fortress
- Architecture of Azerbaijan
