= Şağan =

- Municipality
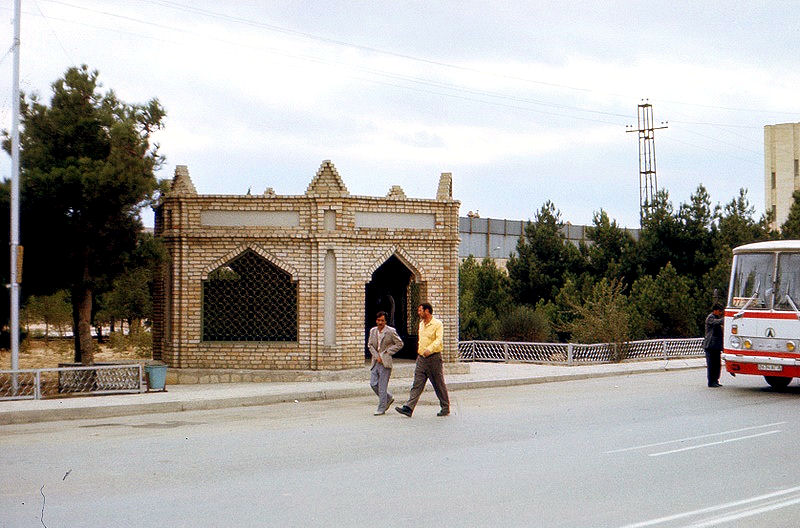
- View of Şağan

- Location within Azerbaijan
- Coordinates: 40°29′38″N 50°07′50″E
- Country: Azerbaijan
- City: Baku
- Raion: Əzizbəyov

Population
  - Total: 3,191
- Time zone: UTC+4 (AZT)
  - Summer (DST): UTC+5 (AZT)

Şağan (also, Shagan and Shagany) is a settlement and municipality in Baku, Azerbaijan. It has a population of 3,191. Shaghan Castle is located here.

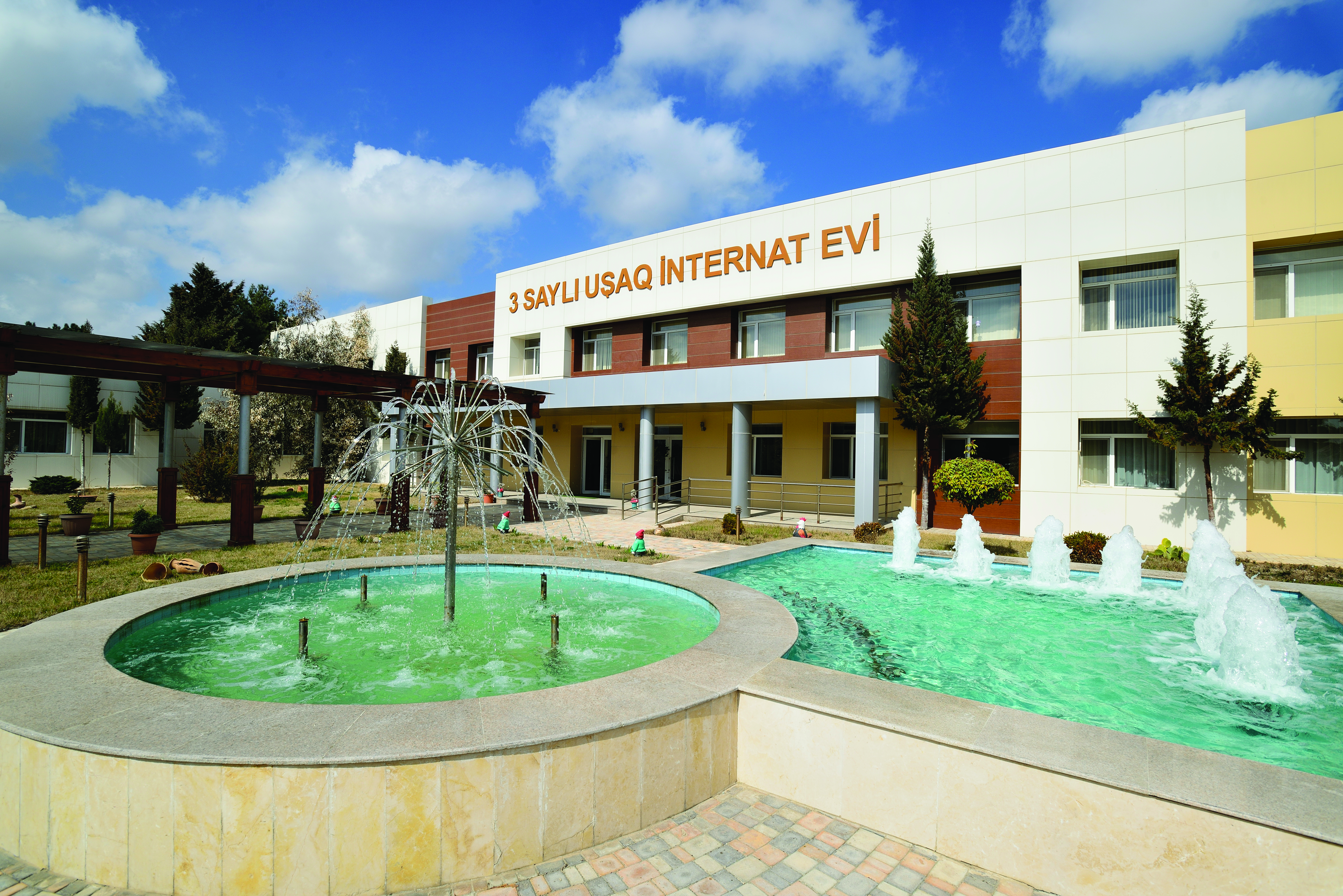
Boarding house No. 3 in Shagan settlement of Khazar region

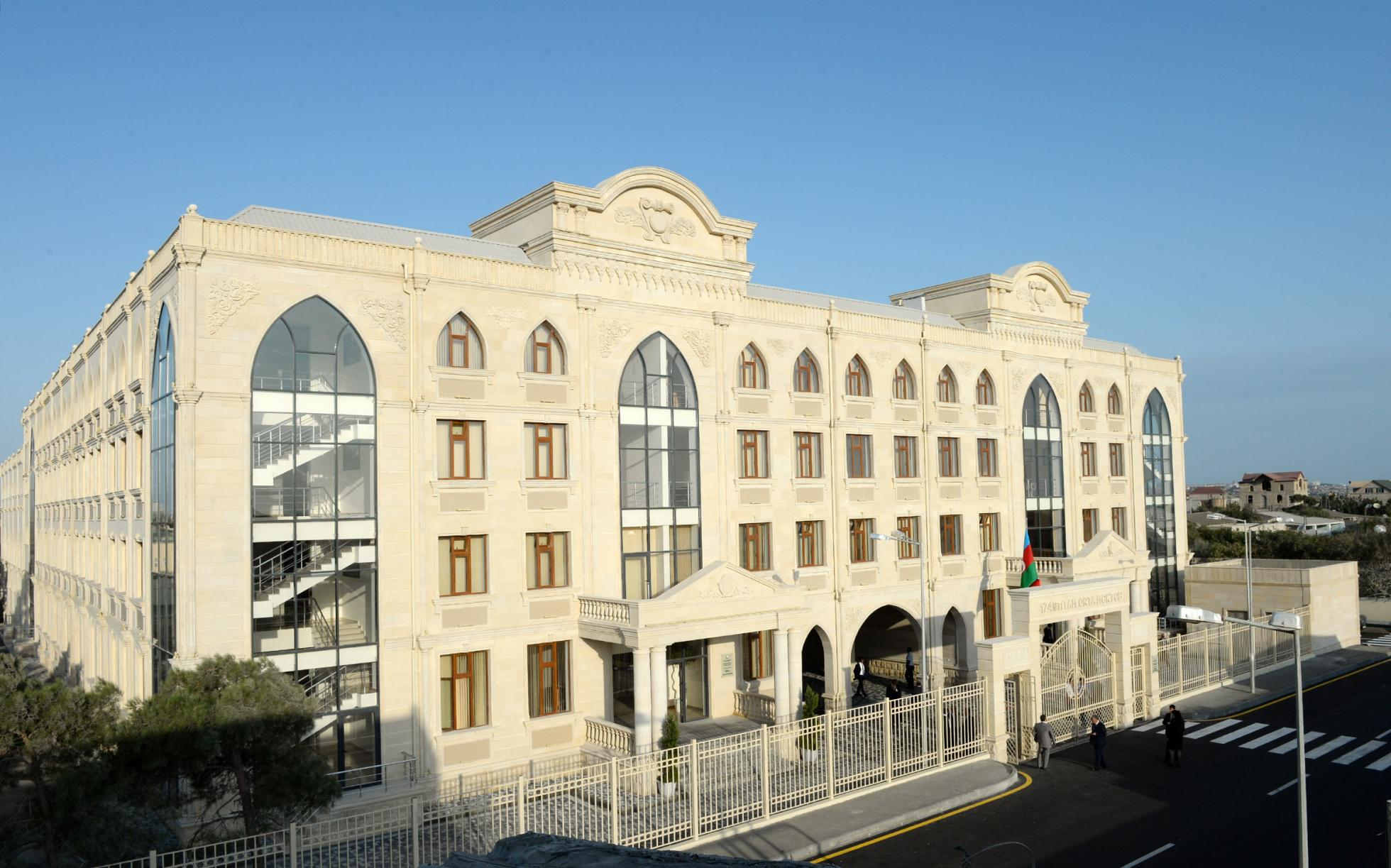
School-124
