= Azerbaijan State Pantomime Theatre =

Pantomime theatre in Baku, Azerbaijan

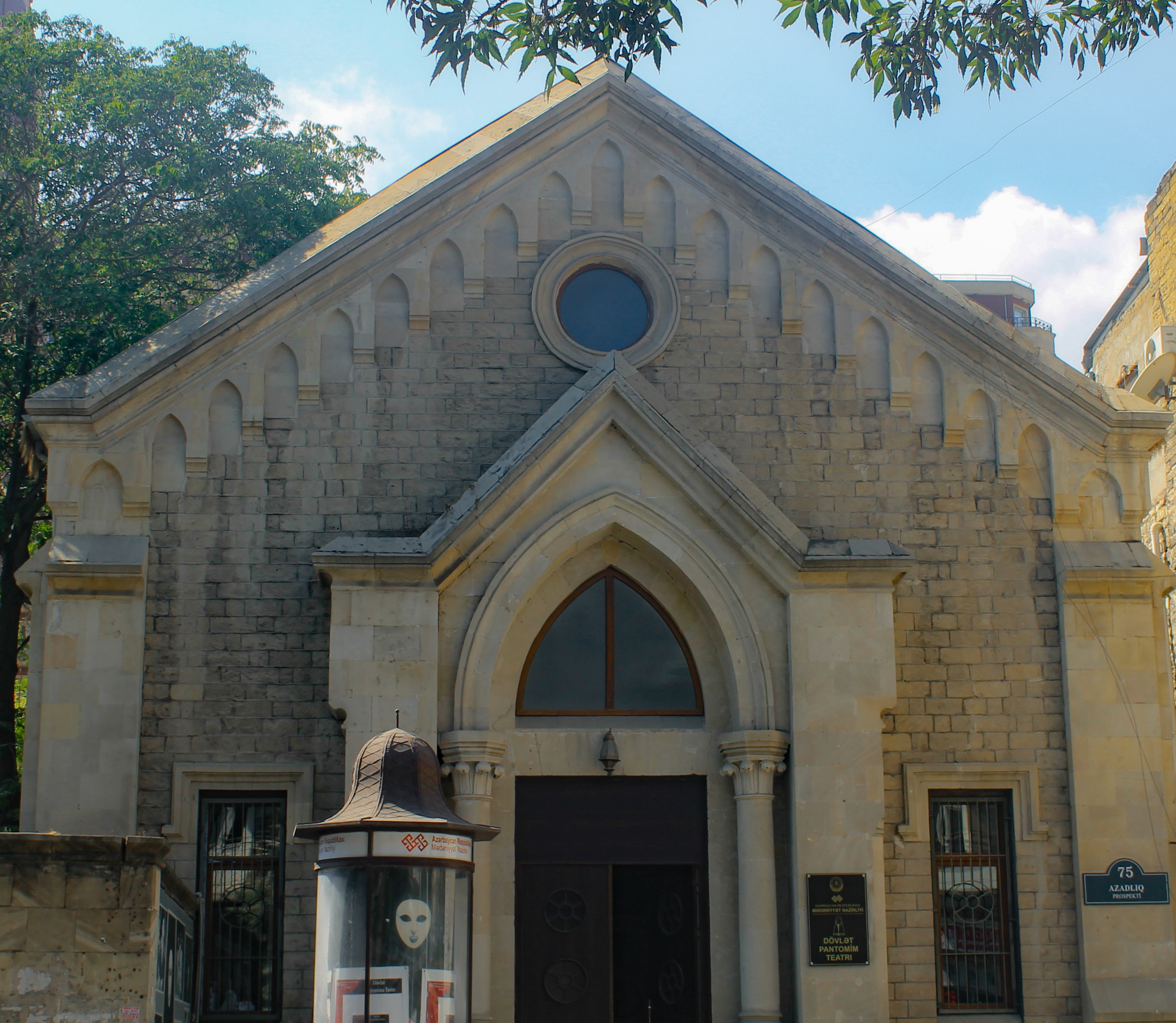
- Azerbaijan State Pantomime Theatre.
- Interactive map of Azerbaijan State Pantomime Theatre
- Address: 49 Azadlyg Ave. Baku; Azerbaijan
- Coordinates: 40°22′55″N 49°50′46″E

Construction
- Opened: 1994

Website
- www.pantomima.az

Azerbaijan State Pantomime Theatre (Azerbaijani: Azərbaycan Dövlət Pantomim Teatrı) is a pantomime theatre in Baku, Azerbaijan.

== History ==
The theatre was founded in 1994 by Bakhtiyar Khanizadeh, an actor of the Azerbaijan State Theatre of Young Spectators. He worked closely with students of the Azerbaijan State University of Culture and Arts and selected the ones he considered fit to establish the pioneer mime theatre studio in Azerbaijan. For the next 11 years, the theatre was based in the building of the Theatre of Young Spectators until relocated to the building of the Shafag Cinema. In 2000, the theatre received the status of a state theatre.

Beginning in 2000, the theatre has twice housed the Himjim International Pantomime festivals. As of 2009, it has toured 12 countries, its repertoire including 24 plays by both local and foreign playwrights.

== Gallery of Spectacles ==
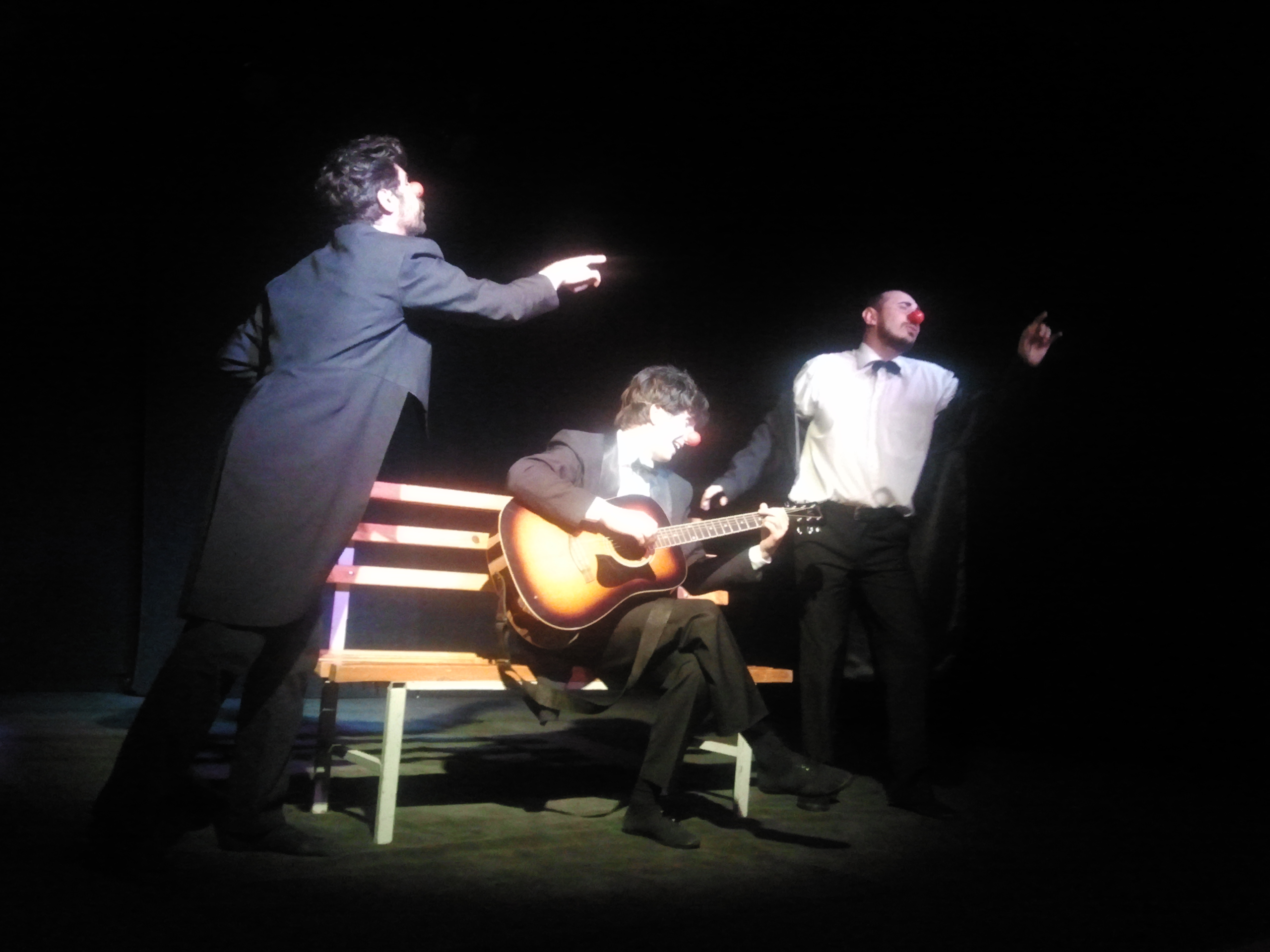
Bouquet of Pantomime. Directed by Bakhtiyar Khanizadeh

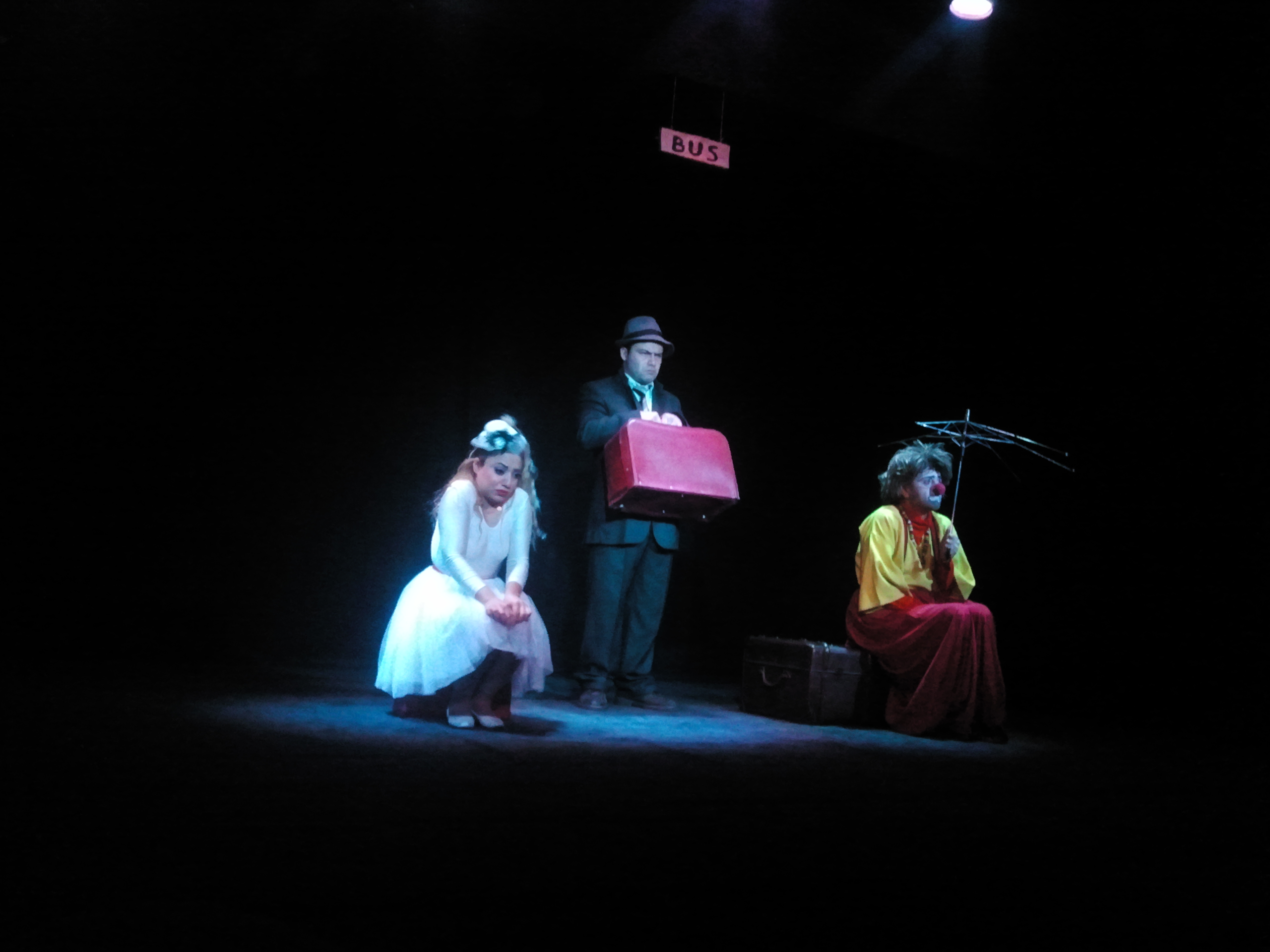
There and Here. Directed by Bahruz Vagifoghlu
