= "Üns" Theatre =

Contemporary theatre in Baku, Azerbaijan

Coordinates: 40°21′41.19″N 49°50′3.57″E

The contemporary Theatre ÜNS was opened in Baku in 2006. The head of the project – professor Nargiz Pashayeva used to call the theatre "a creative stage".

ÜNS is not an acronym, as it may seem, but the root of the word "ÜNSiyyət". The word has several meanings: friendship, communication, mutual understanding, inner world of the individual. The name accurately reflects the essence of the theatre project. The conceptual and artistic priorities of the theatre are aimed at rising the level of Azerbaijani theatre art, based on the traditions of the past to combine tradition and newness. The Foundation of Friends of Azerbaijani Culture has been the key investor of the project.

The building used to be based on two ramshackle walls of a former transformer station built in the 1920s. Today the theatre building consists of two distinct and organically linked units: the reconstructed and refurbished building of the transformer station (room and stage) and the administrative building made of glass, metal and plastics. The reconstruction was led by the Baku architect Oqtay Sattarov while the decorations of the interior of ÜNS were done by the artist Altay Sadygzade. The sound, light, video and stage have been elaborated and installed by one of the Russian companies.

== Activity ==
At different times, the stage of ÜNS was visited by such cultural personalities as Sergei Yusky and Alexander Filippenko, Alexander Shirvindt and Mikhail Derzhavin, Kostantin Raikin and Gennedy Khazanov, Edvard Radzinsky and Aleksey Batalov. The spectators could see the works of such directors as Dmitry Bertman, Petr Fomenko, Roman Viktuk, Robert Sturua and others.

ÜNS has also staged its own drama performances based on the plays written specifically for the theatre- "Final Restaurant" by Magsud Ibrahimbeyov, "Shakespeare" by Elchin Efendiyev, musicals "Baku" and "Notre-Drame de Paris". The theatre has also hosted recitals, concerts and exhibitions. Many people still recall the unforgettable performances by Russian director Roman Viktuk- the plays "Edith Piaf, My Legionnaire" and "Trees die while standing" based on the play by Alejandro Casona. The Theatre has also hosted concerts by French musicians of Arab origin who performed oriental music in a new style, the performances of a Corsican ethnic choir, concerts of the jazz pianist Shahin Novrasli and many others.

The theatre also remembers art evenings within the framework of the experimental and interdisciplinary project "Indi" which aims at bringing together representatives of various types of modern art.
