= Museum of Archaeology and Ethnography =

Museum of Archaeology and Anthropology
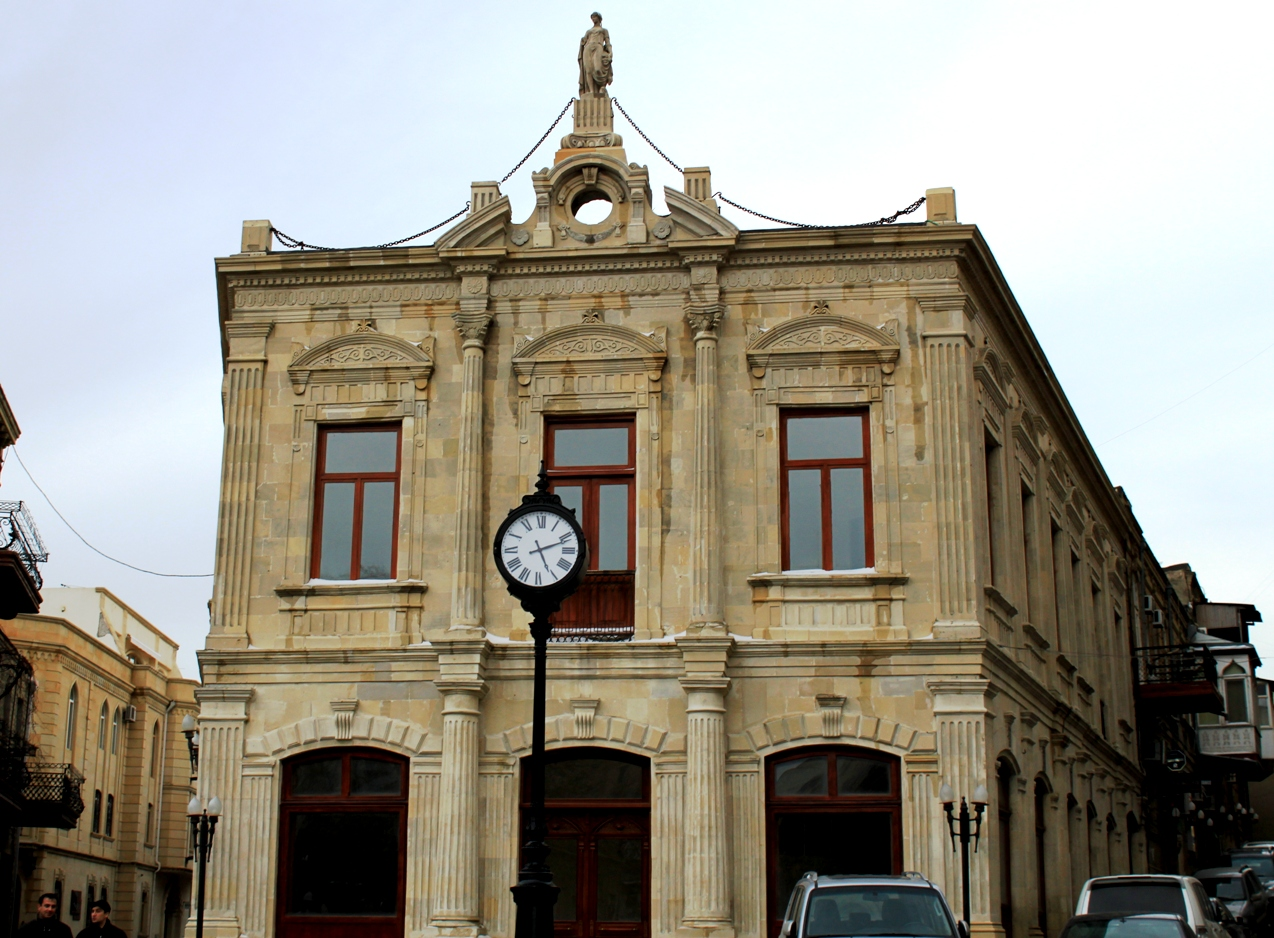
- Alternative names: Exhibition Hall of the Institute of Archaeology and Anthropology, Azerbaijan National Academy of Sciences

General information
- Status: Museum
- Type: Residential
- Architectural style: Classicism
- Location: Icherisheher, Baku, Azerbaijan
- Coordinates: 40.3672°N 49.8361°E
- Completed: Early 20th century
- Owner: Administration of State Historical-Architectural Reserve Icherisheher

The Museum of Archaeology and Anthropology (Azerbaijani: Arxeologiya və Antropologiya Muzeyi), located in Baku, Azerbaijan. Exhibition Hall of the Institute of Archaeology and Anthropology, Azerbaijan National Academy of Sciences.

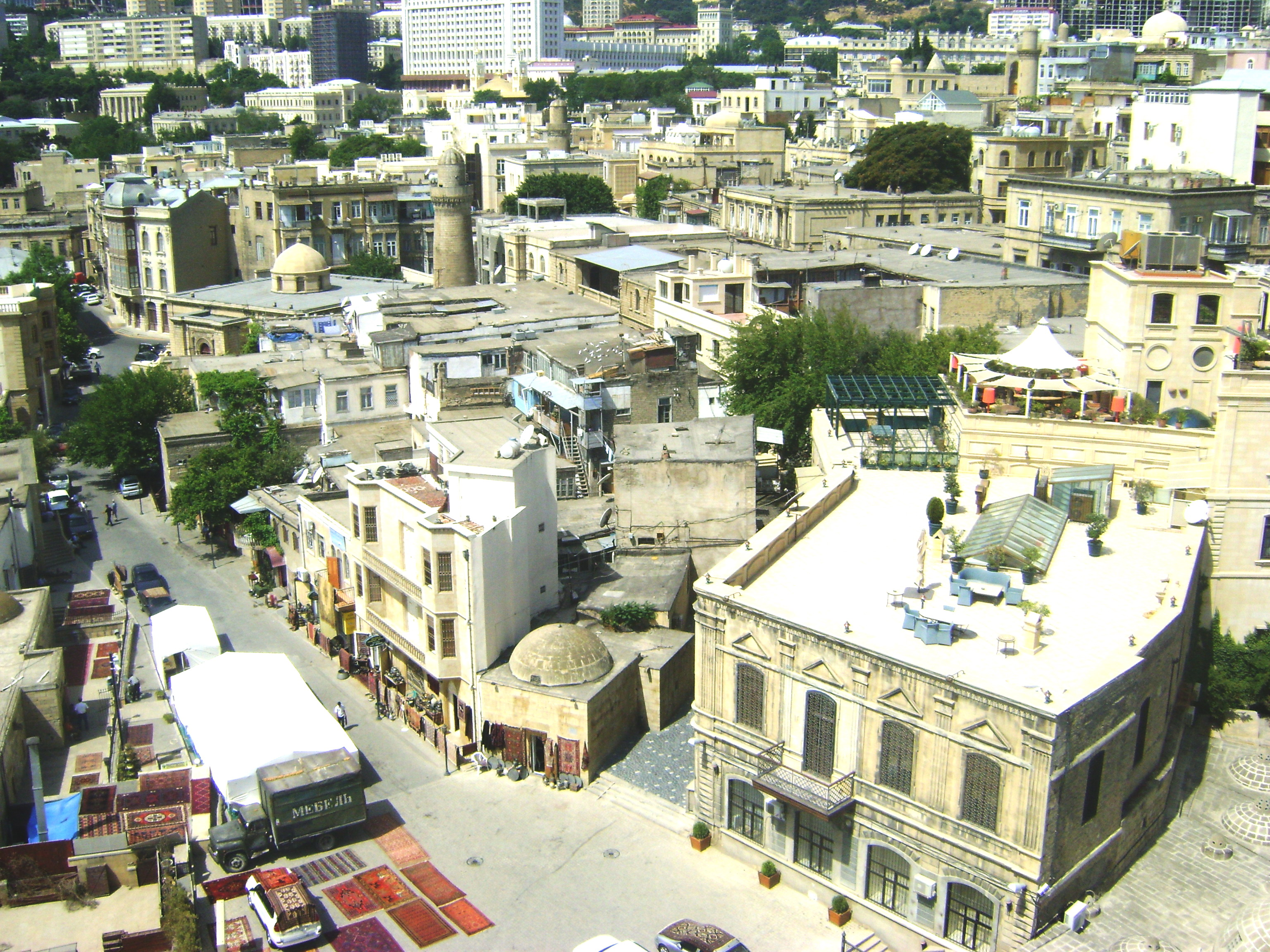
Old City

== History of the Museum ==
The Museum of Archaeology and Anthropology operates under the Institute of Archaeology and Anthropology of the Azerbaijan National Academy of Sciences (ANAS). The formation of this institute was the result of a long historical process. In 1974, an Archaeology and Ethnography Sector was established within the Institute of History, covering several departments.

On July 8, 1993, the Cabinet of Ministers of the Republic of Azerbaijan issued a decree transforming this sector into the Institute of Archaeology and Ethnography. In 2021, the name was changed to the Institute of Archaeology, Ethnography and Anthropology, and finally, on January 19, 2024, it was renamed the Institute of Archaeology and Anthropology.

The museum’s exhibition hall operates under the Institute. It was originally established in the 1980s, but ceased operations in the 1990s due to technical issues. After renovations, the museum reopened in 2015 and continues to serve as a key center for public and scholarly engagement with Azerbaijan’s ancient history.

== The building ==
The museum is housed in a historical building constructed in the early 20th century, known locally as the “Zəncirli Ev” (Chained House). In 1920, the property belonged to a merchant named Haji Mammmadhusseyn Mammadov. In 1928, it was purchased by the Malikov brothers, well-known merchants in Baku's Icherisheher (Old City).

In 1930, the building was confiscated by the Baku Customs Office due to smuggling allegations and was transferred to state ownership. From that year, it housed the N. Narimanov Sewing Factory. During its time as a factory, changes were made to the building’s facade, and some original architectural features were removed. Due to its last private owners, the building is still referred to as the Malikov Mansion.

Today, the building hosts the Museum and Exhibition Hall of the Institute of Archaeology and Anthropology of ANAS. Architecturally, it holds a distinctive place among early 20th-century structures in Icherisheher due to its unique style and aesthetic.

== Museum Exhibits ==
The museum features over 1,000 exhibits displayed in 36 showcases. These items represent the material and spiritual heritage of Azerbaijan from prehistoric times up to the Middle Ages.

The collection includes archaeological artifacts from various historical periods — from the Stone Age to the medieval era — such as tools, household items, jewelry, weapons, and ritual objects, providing a comprehensive view of the country’s ancient past.
