= Gala State Historical Ethnographic Reserve =

Museum complex in Baku, Azerbaijan

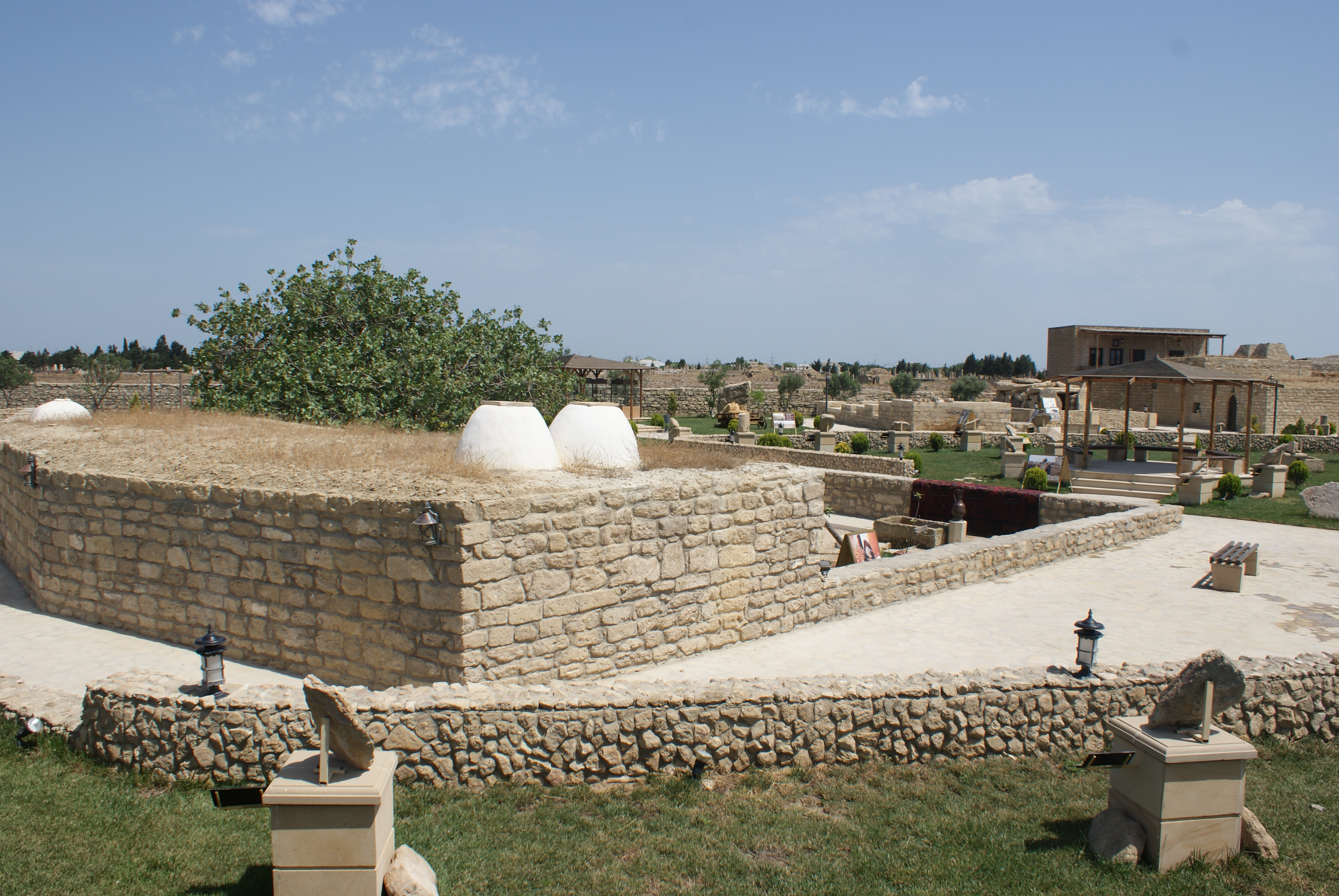
Gala State Historical Ethnographic Preserve

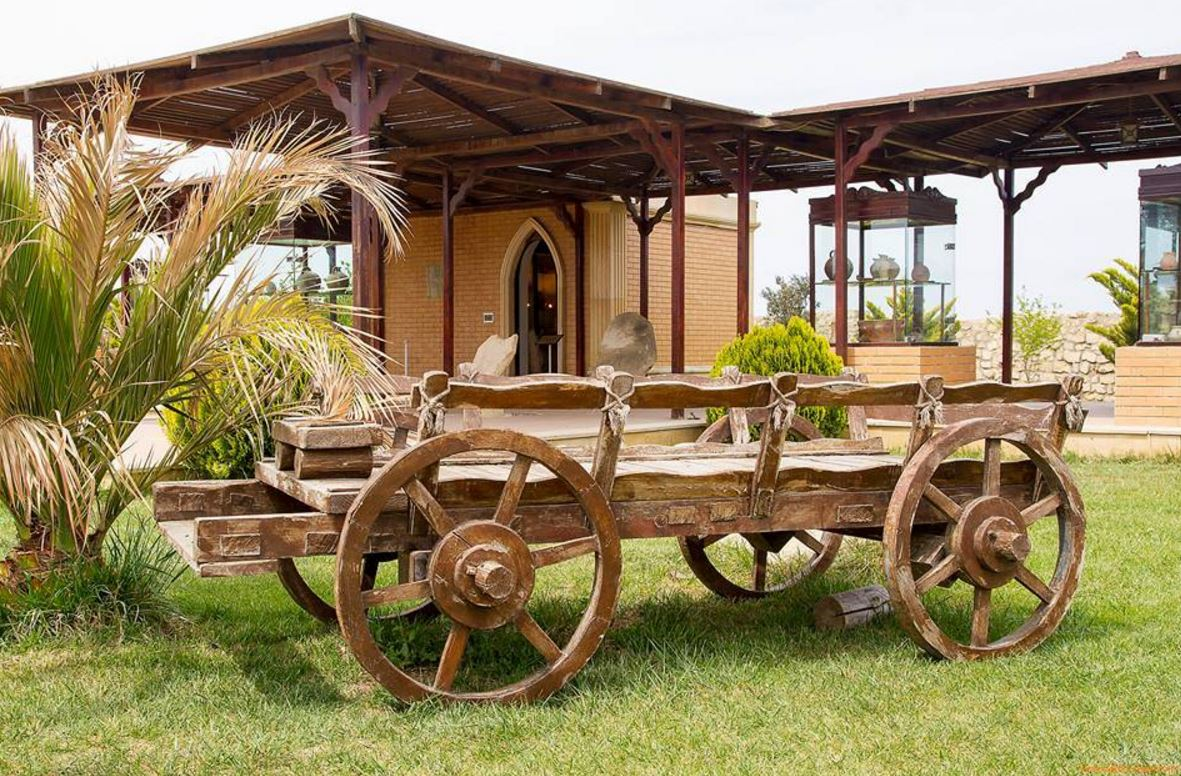
Another view

The Gala State Historical Ethnographic Reserve is a complex of museums in Baku, Azerbaijan. Inside there are three different types of museums: Museum of Archaeology and Ethnography (open-air), Castle Museum (partly open-air), and the Museum of Antiques. Vehicles are offered to visitors due to the spacious area of museums. There are the tours in different languages: Azerbaijani, Russian, English, German and French.

The museum is 1.5 ha in area and has rock paintings, pottery, household items, jewelry, weapons and coins belong to the ancient times of Azerbaijan. In this museum, there are more than 2,000 different archaeological and architectural monuments – mounds, seats of ancient settlements, burial places dating back to thousands of years ago.

The reserve was established in the year of 2008 under the auspices of the Heydar Aliyev Foundation. It is located in Qala, 40km far from Baku and bears the name of this district. Gala-State Historical Ethnographic Reserve is devoted to the history of the Absheron Peninsula. As a result of archaeological excavations, it is feasible to get the picture of the lifestyle of the Azerbaijani people from ancient times to the Middle Ages.

There is an 18th-century tandoor, two underground passages belonging to the 10th and 15th centuries. Besides these, old houses, portable tents made of animal skins, stone and straw houses with domes, an old smithy, a pottery workshop, and a thresher can be found. All these can be touched and photographed.

== Gala Museum ==
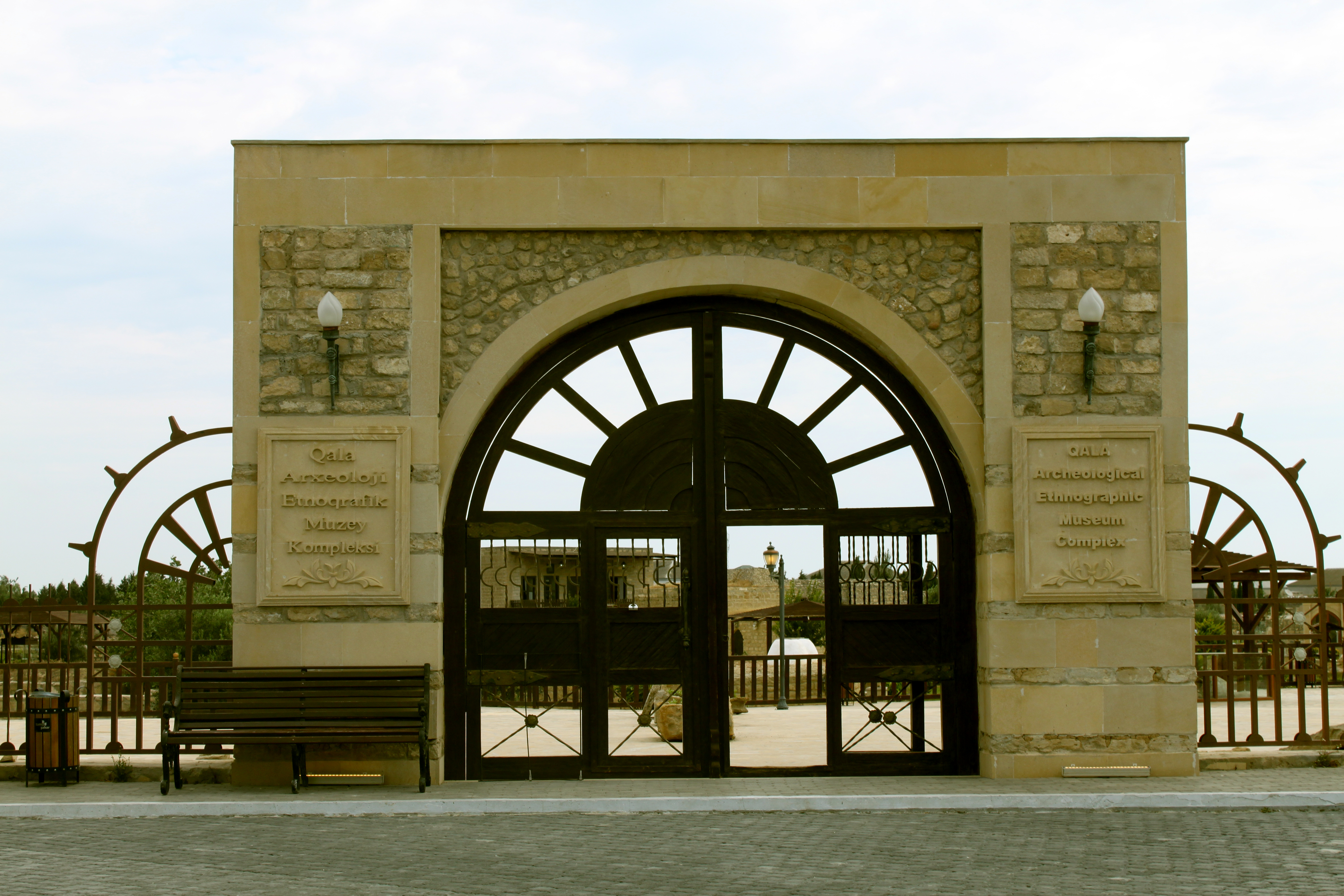
Gala Museum

There are 243 historic-architectural monuments (mosques, ancient living buildings, baths, coffee beans, walls of ancient houses, etc.) in the Gala Museum. There are also 400-year-old pistachio trees, figs, figs, olive trees, flowers and other decorative items in the territory of the reserve.

In 2008, on the initiative of the Heydar Aliyev Foundation, the Archeological and Ethnographic Museum Complex under the open sky was established. Archaeological architectural monuments discovered on the Absheron Peninsula were collected and restored here. The mounds, settlements and other architectural monuments of the 3rd-2nd millennium BC were built in the same way as before the era.

Ancient mounds, gravestones, dwellings, quarries, places of worship and some other material cultural remains found in the territory of Absheron Peninsula reflect the mood of the previous millennia. One of the mounds is called "Dubendi". The basis of this mound is the rug-shaped stone-masonry.

Tools made from sheep bones and stone were found in the Reserve area. The "Turkan" mound also consists of a ring-shaped stonework. There is also a quadrilateral hole in this mound.

There are residues of water and food wells, coffee houses, ancient houses in the territory of the reserve. Archaeological excavations have been proven to be the Bronze Age settlement, 5,000 years ago in the village of Gala.

In the ancient village of Gala, there were a number of fields of art. One of them is pottery. Pottery products discovered during archaeological excavations in Galada are potentially interested in terms of pottery. The ancient carpets, the tools used during the carpet weaving - the apron, the cloth, the scissors, the hooked knife.

Rock paintings and caves dating back to the new stone Bronze Age were discovered during the archaeological excavations in the Aghdash Plain, Khashakhun and Dubendi in the vicinity of Gala village in the east of Absheron. As well as traces of settlements, mounds, hearths and material cultural remains have been discovered here.

There are three baths in the village of Gala: Shor Baths, Gum Baths and Bayramali Baths. The "Shore Bath" was located in the southern part of the village, near the salt lake. There was water from the lake.

== Gallery ==
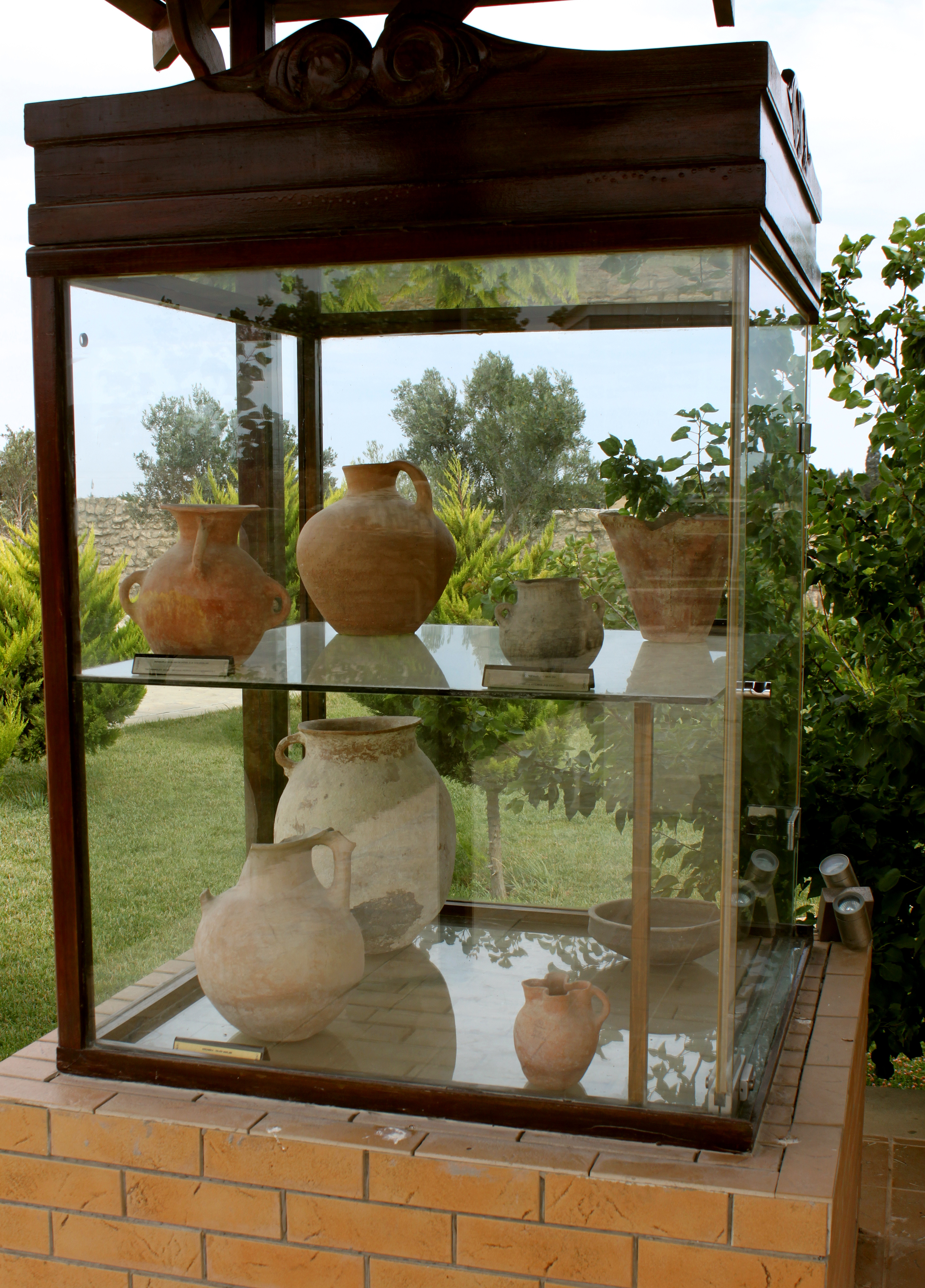
Gala Museum

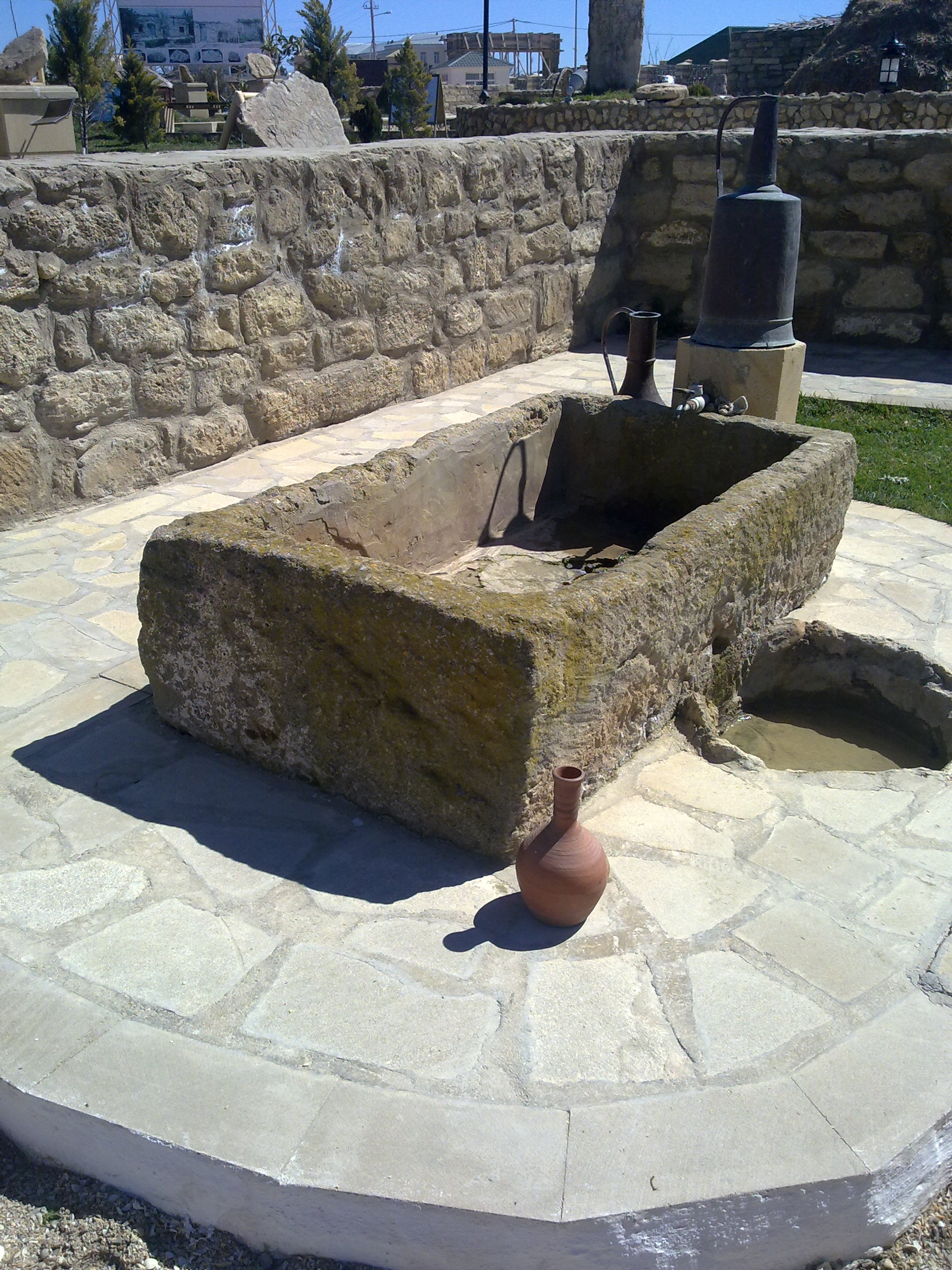
Gala archeological ethnographic museum

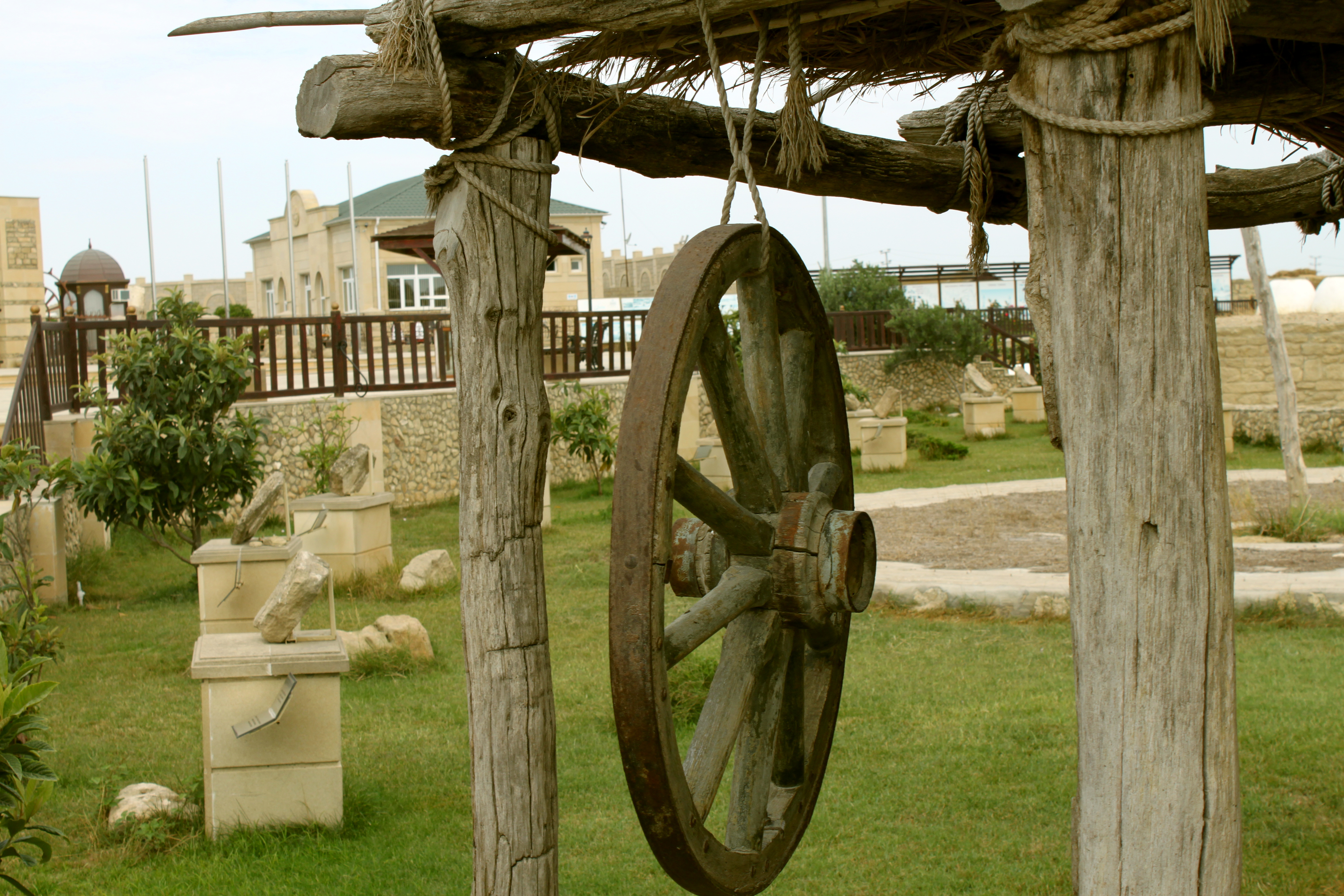
Gala Museum

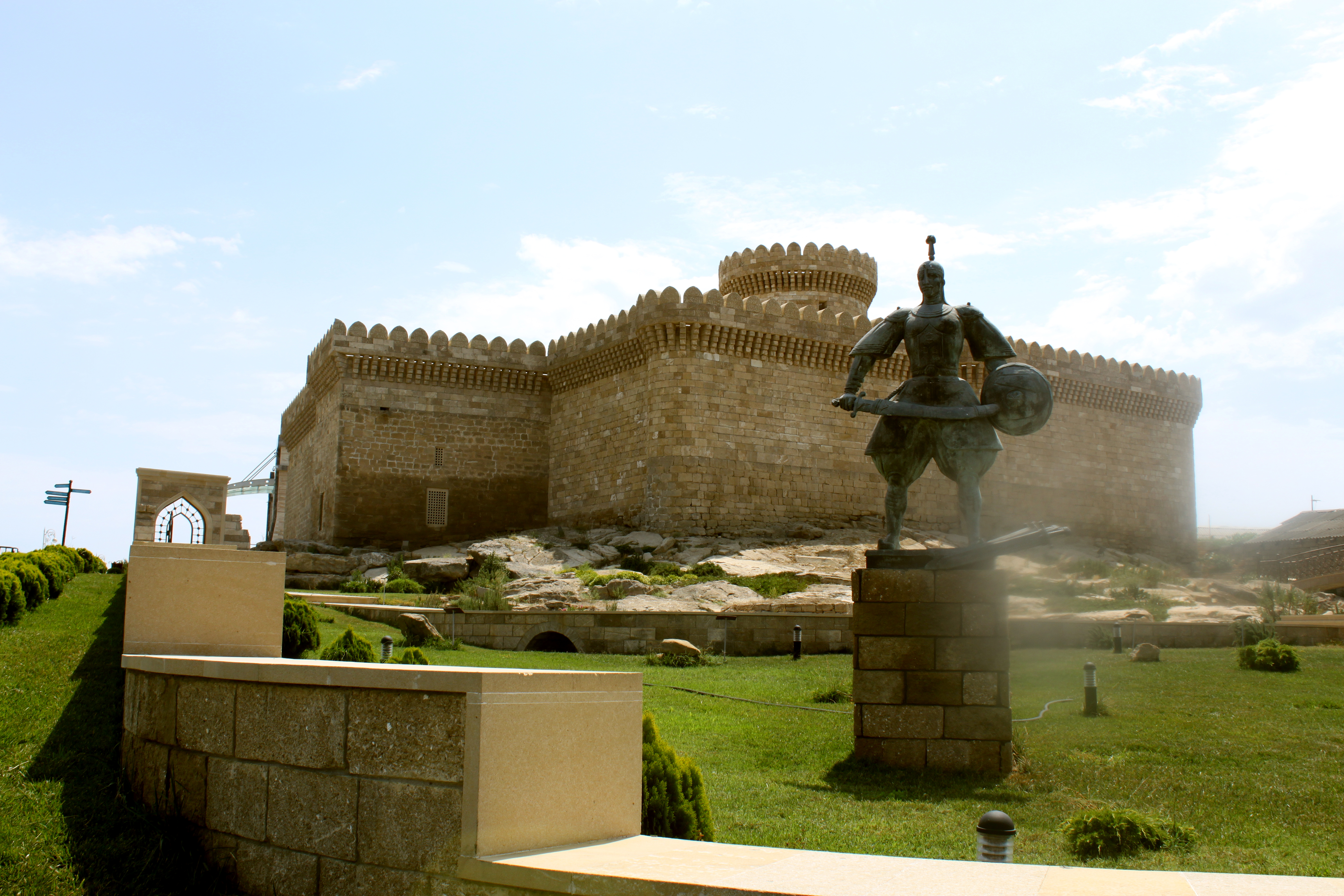
Gala museum - monument

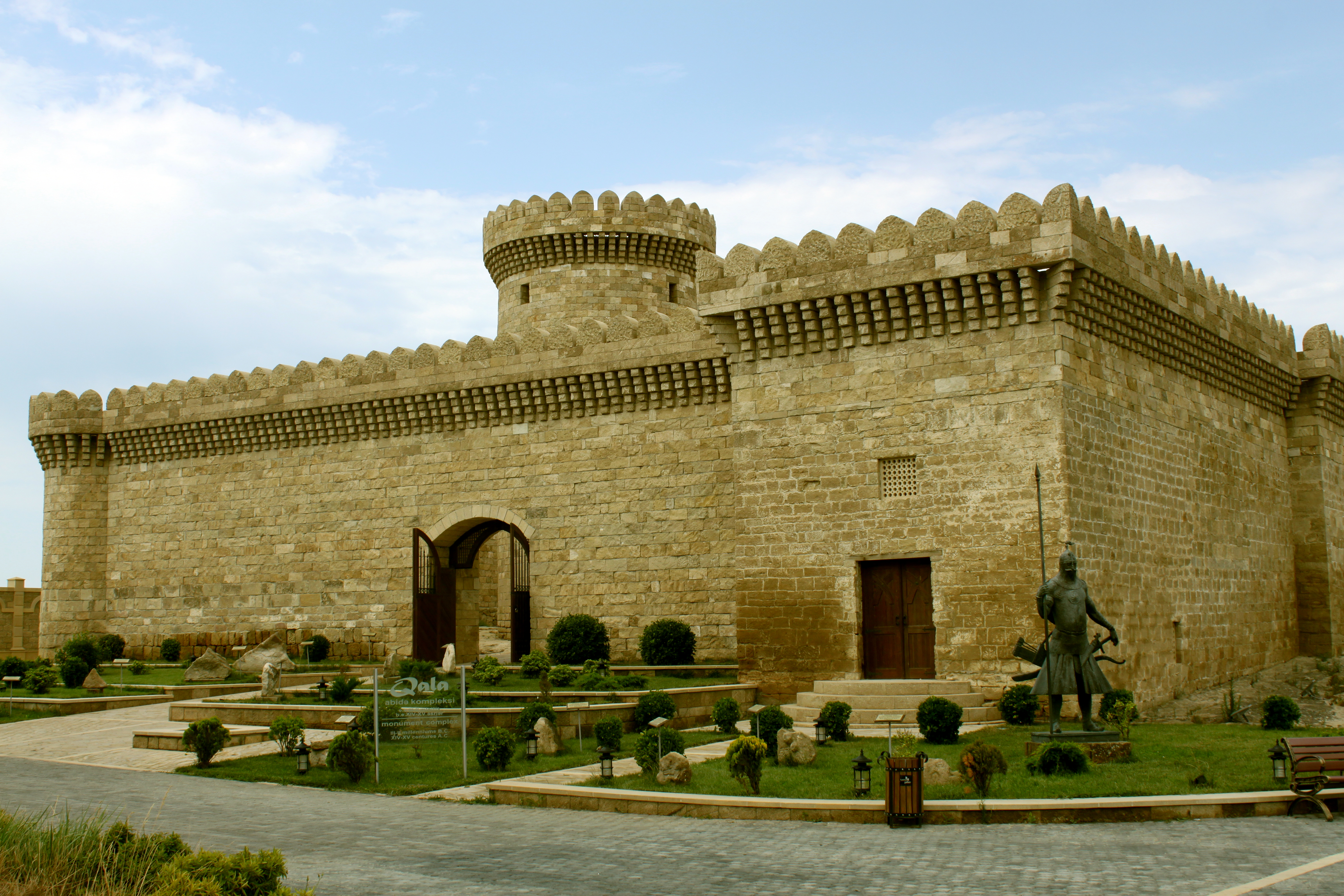
Gala museum -castle walls

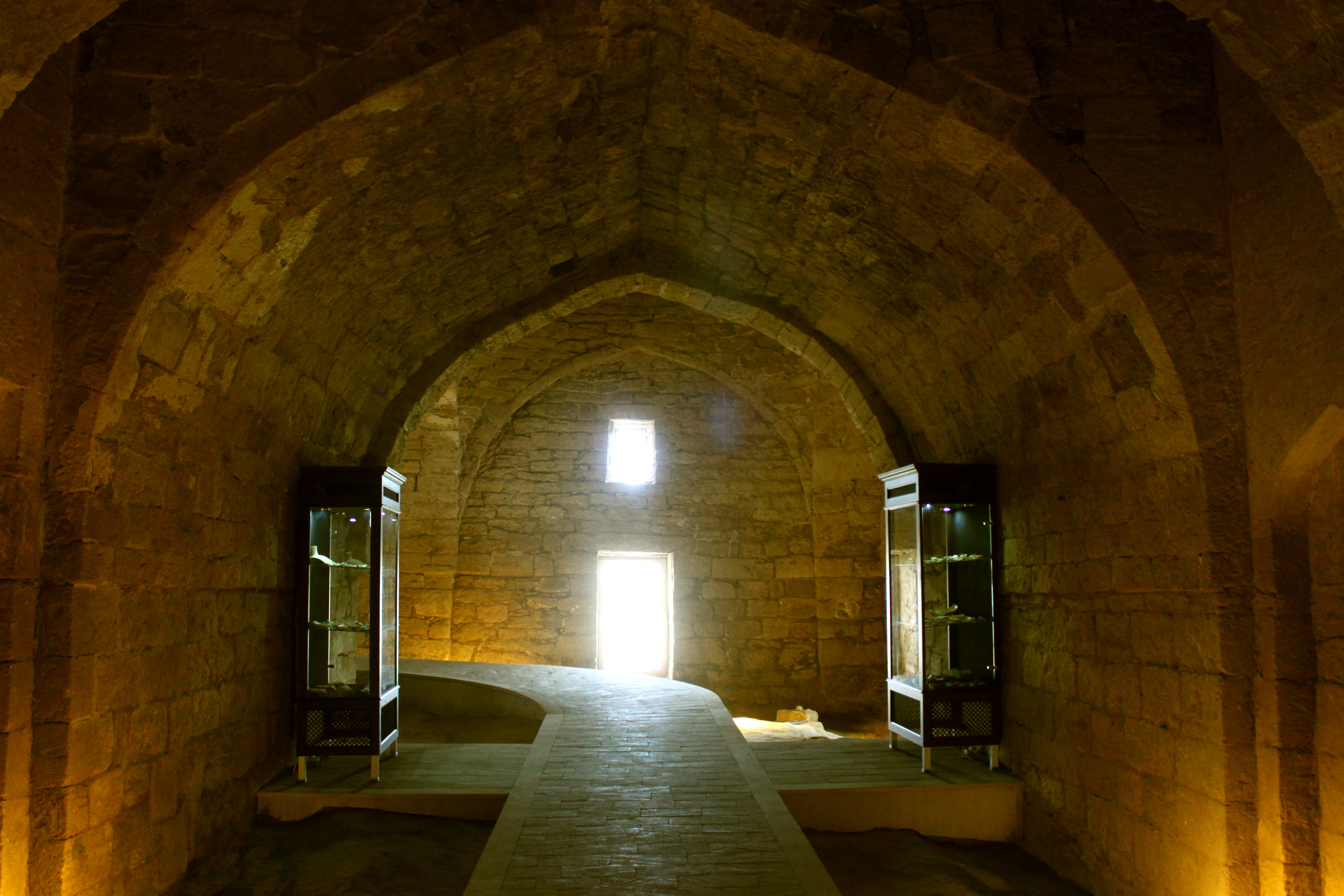
Gala museum

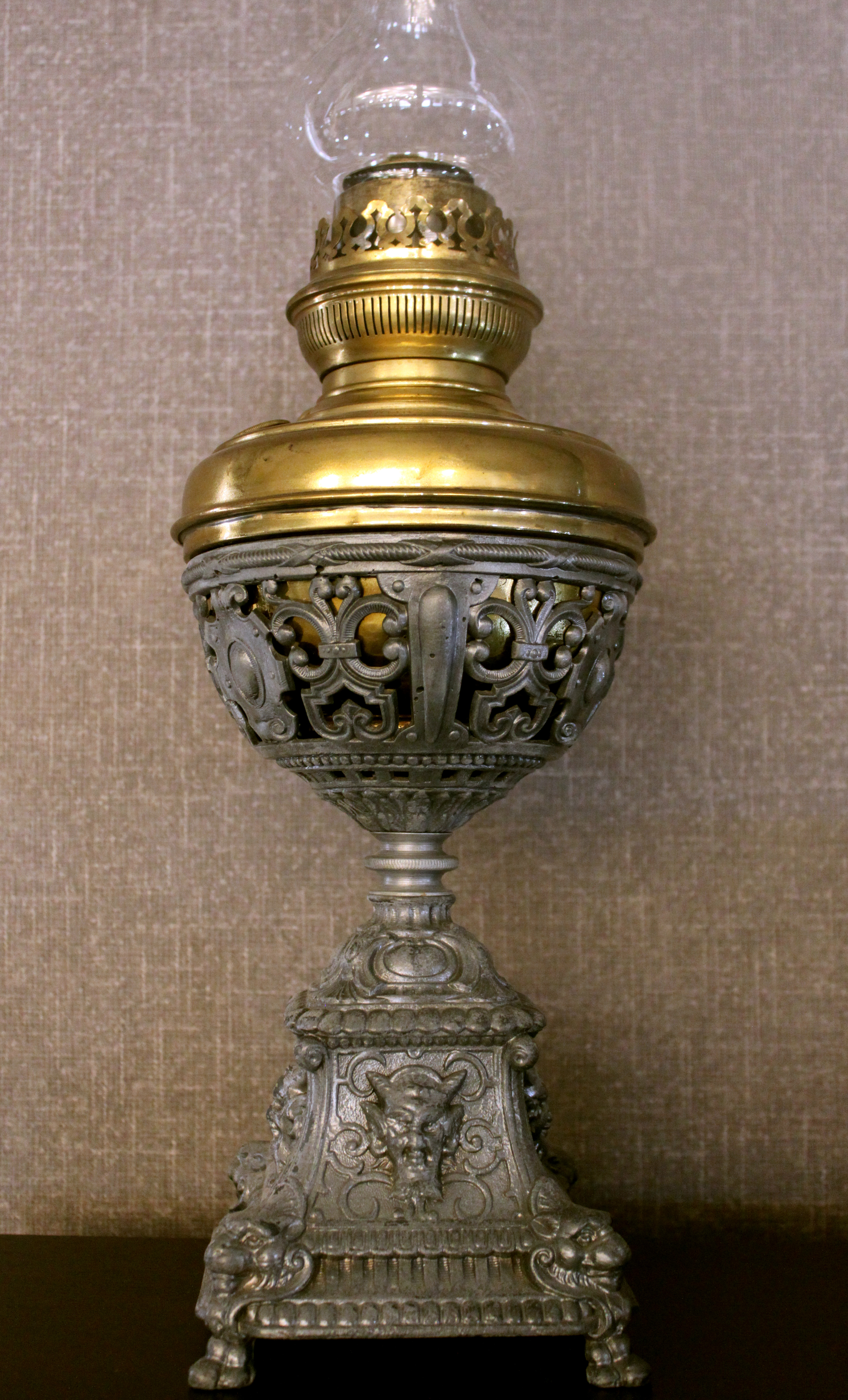
Gala museum -inside
