= Gasim bey Bath =

Historical Monument in Baku

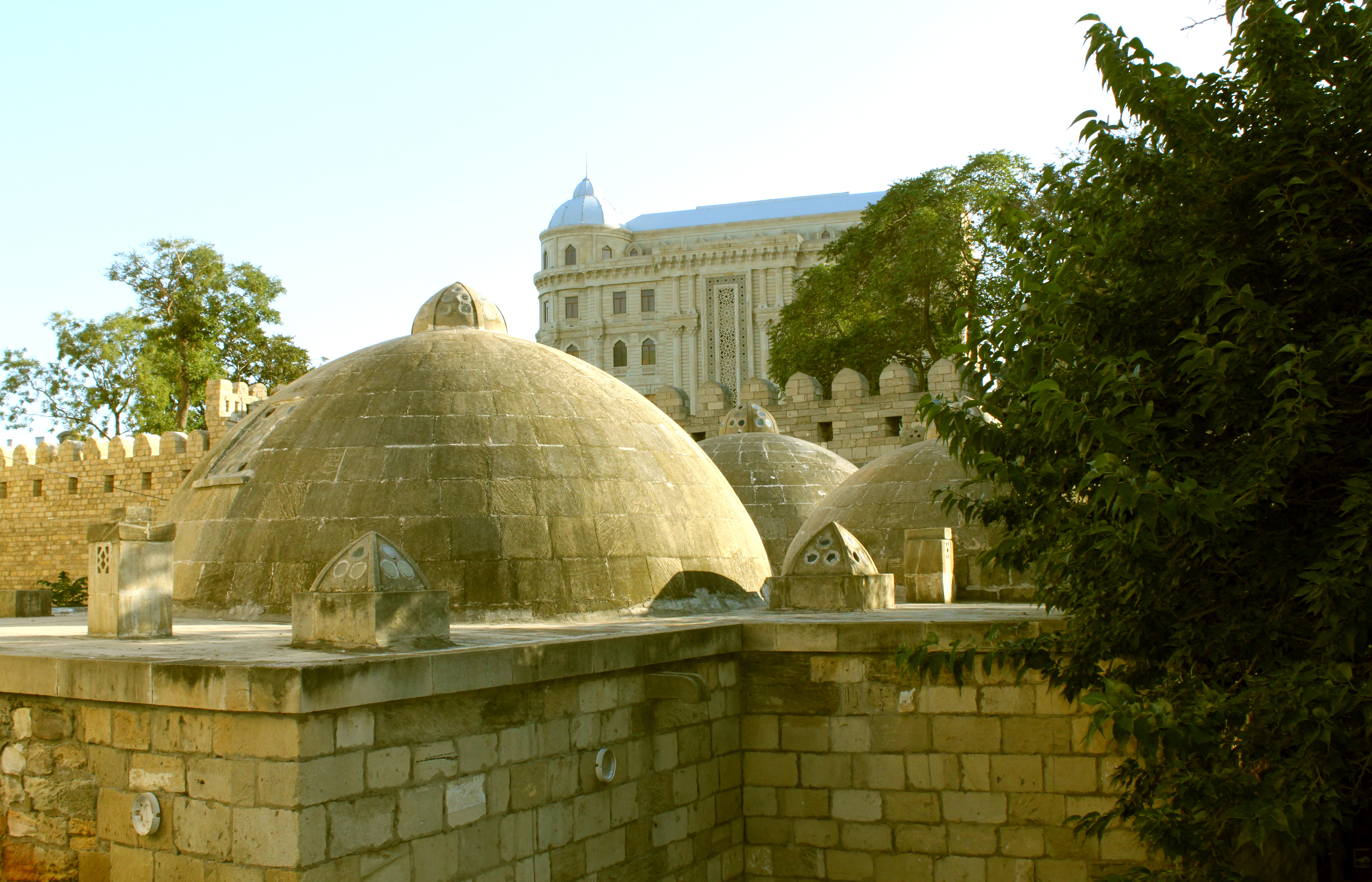
Gasim bey Bath, Baku, Azerbaijan

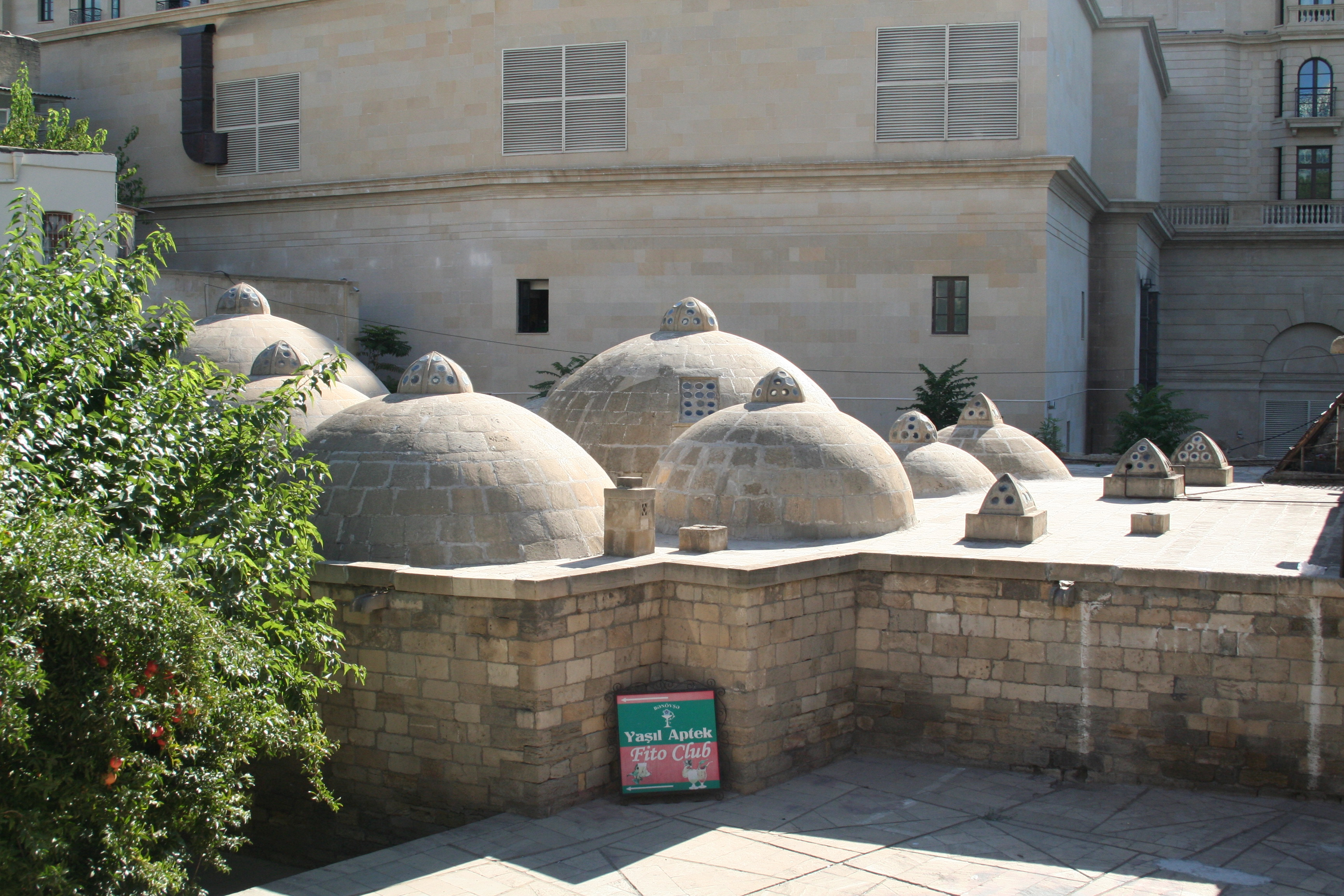
Gasim bey Bath, Old City, Baku, Azerbaijan

The Gasim bey Bath, built in the 17th century, is a medieval monument of national importance. Also named Sweet Bath for the sweets served to bathers with their tea, it is located near the Salyan gates of the fortress, Icheri Sheher, Azerbaijan.

The bath has a traditional design, with an entrance hall, a cloakroom, baths, swimming pools and a boiler-house. Cross-shaped domes are in the dressing room and swimming pool. They were located on the sides of rooms with their chambers. Ceramic tubes were located in the walls and under the floor for supplying water and heating.

In 1970, the bath was reconstructed, and turned into a pharmacy known as the “Green Pharmacy”.
