= List of palaces in Azerbaijan =

List of palaces located in Azerbaijan

In the Azerbaijani language the words "house" and "palace" have various meanings. Usually, church-houses were custom during 2nd century BC – 7th century AD. Mulk is a foreign word which came from Arabia during Caliphate Era. The word "Saray" is a castle, or government building which was considered to have particular administrative importance in various parts of the former Safavid Empire. Imarat or Igamatgah are big house which belong to rich people, khans, shahs. Same type buildings were popular in Midia, Afshar Empire, Karabakh Khanate, Baku Khanate, Shaddadids etc. Now, the term "Villa" is very popular and modern in Azerbaijan since the 1990s for a capitalist system.

== Baku ==
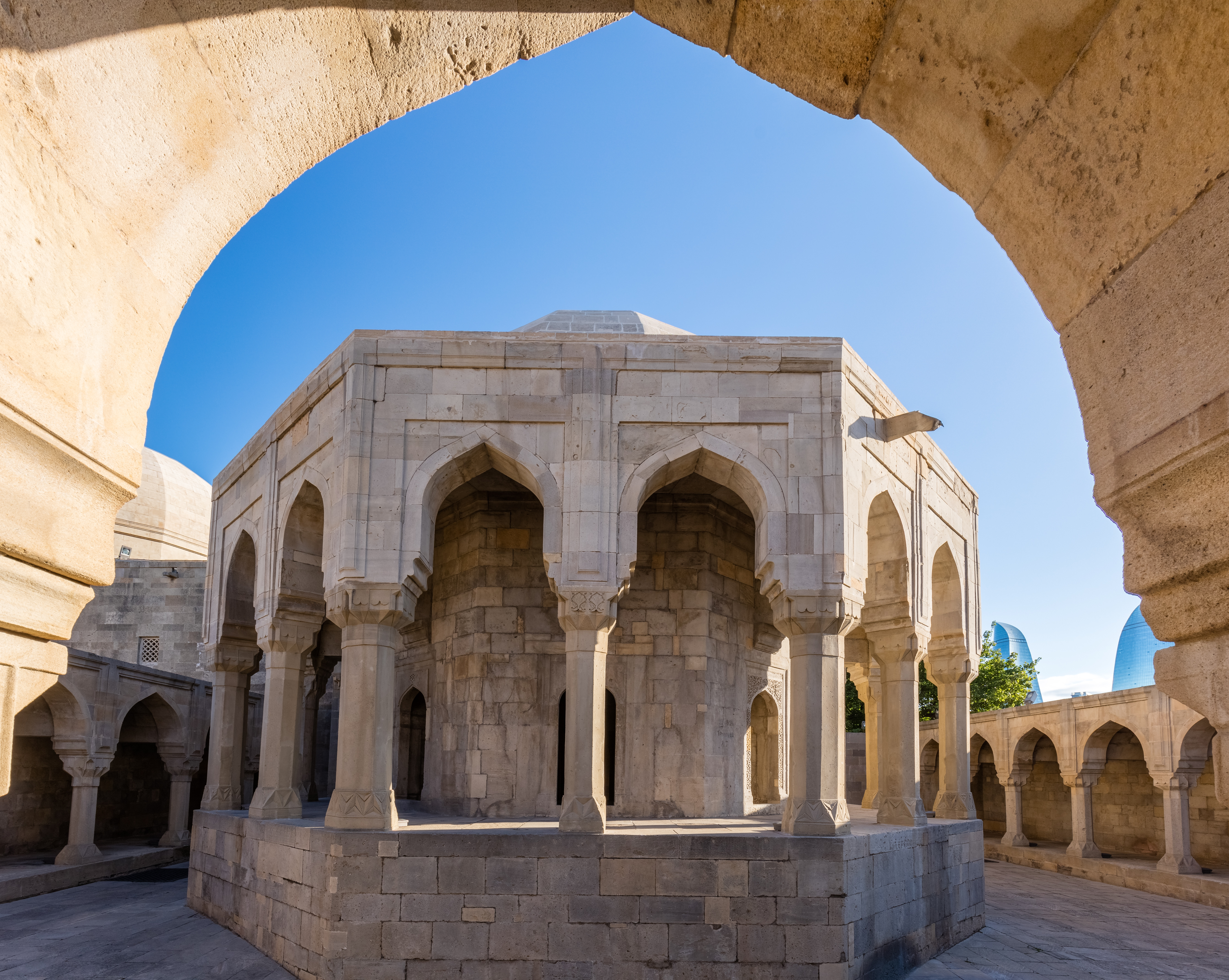
Palace of Shirvanshahs

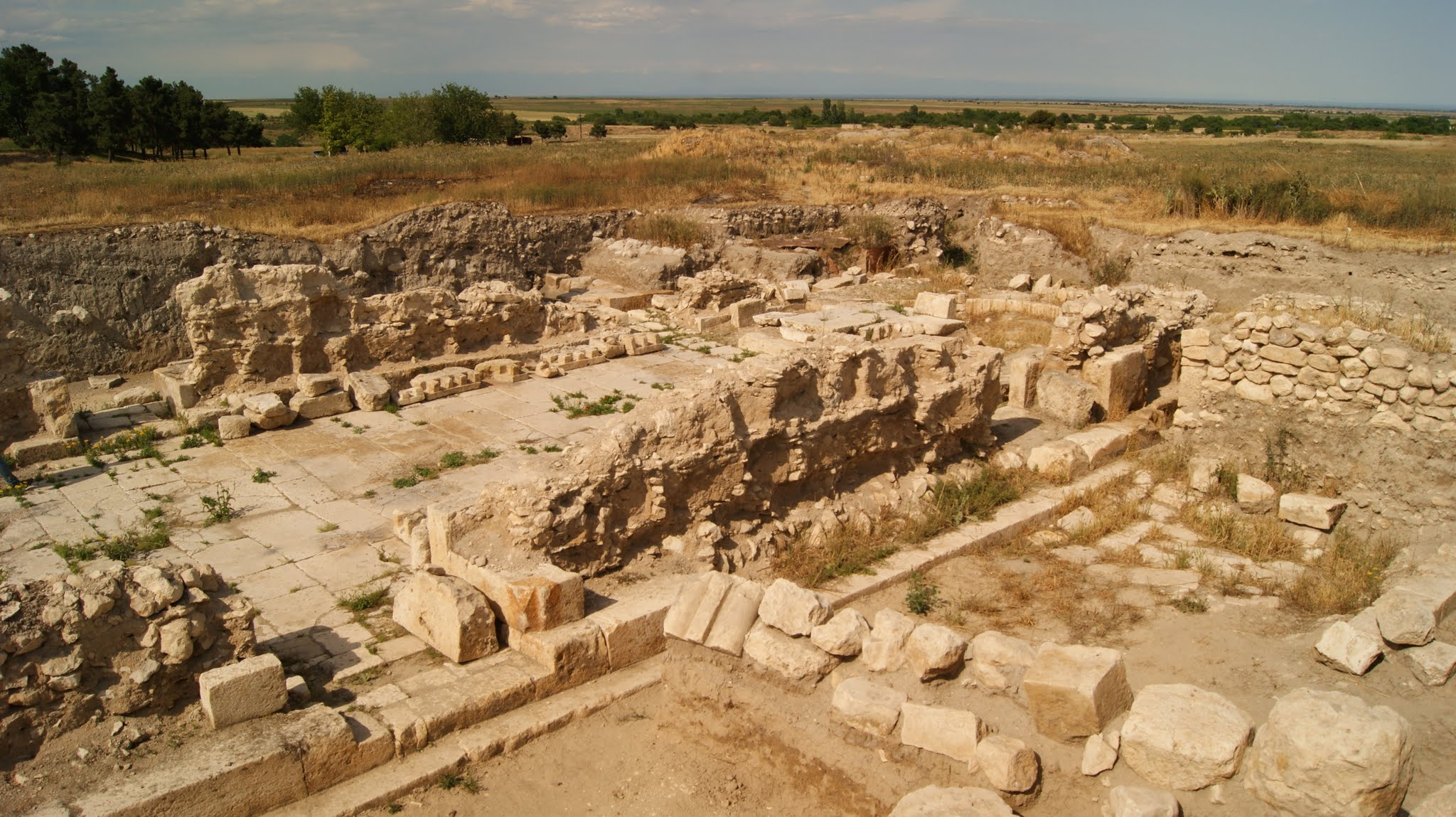
The ruins of Shahbulag Castle Palace (built 2100 years ago)

Gulustan Palace

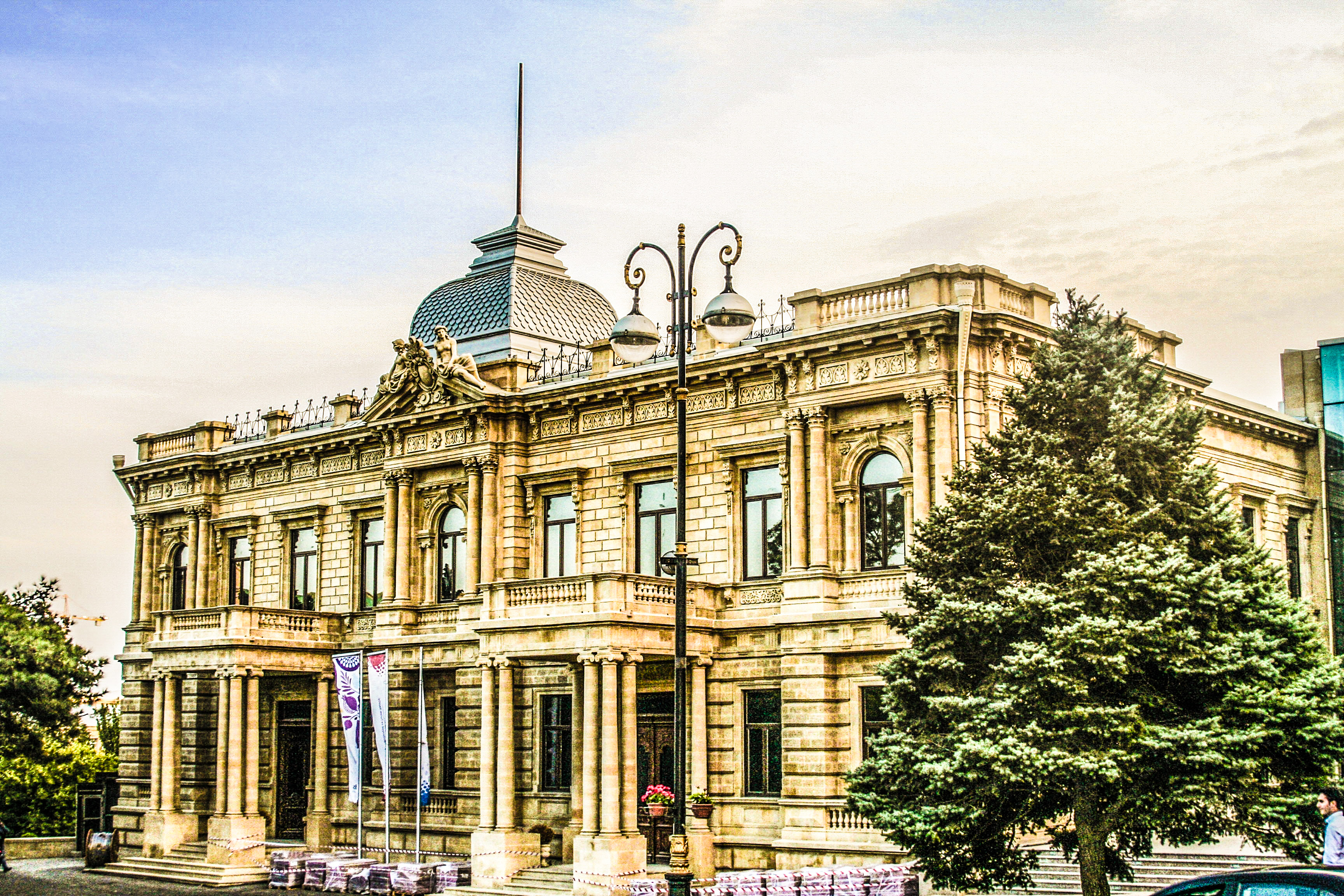
Palace of De Boure built in 1891–1895

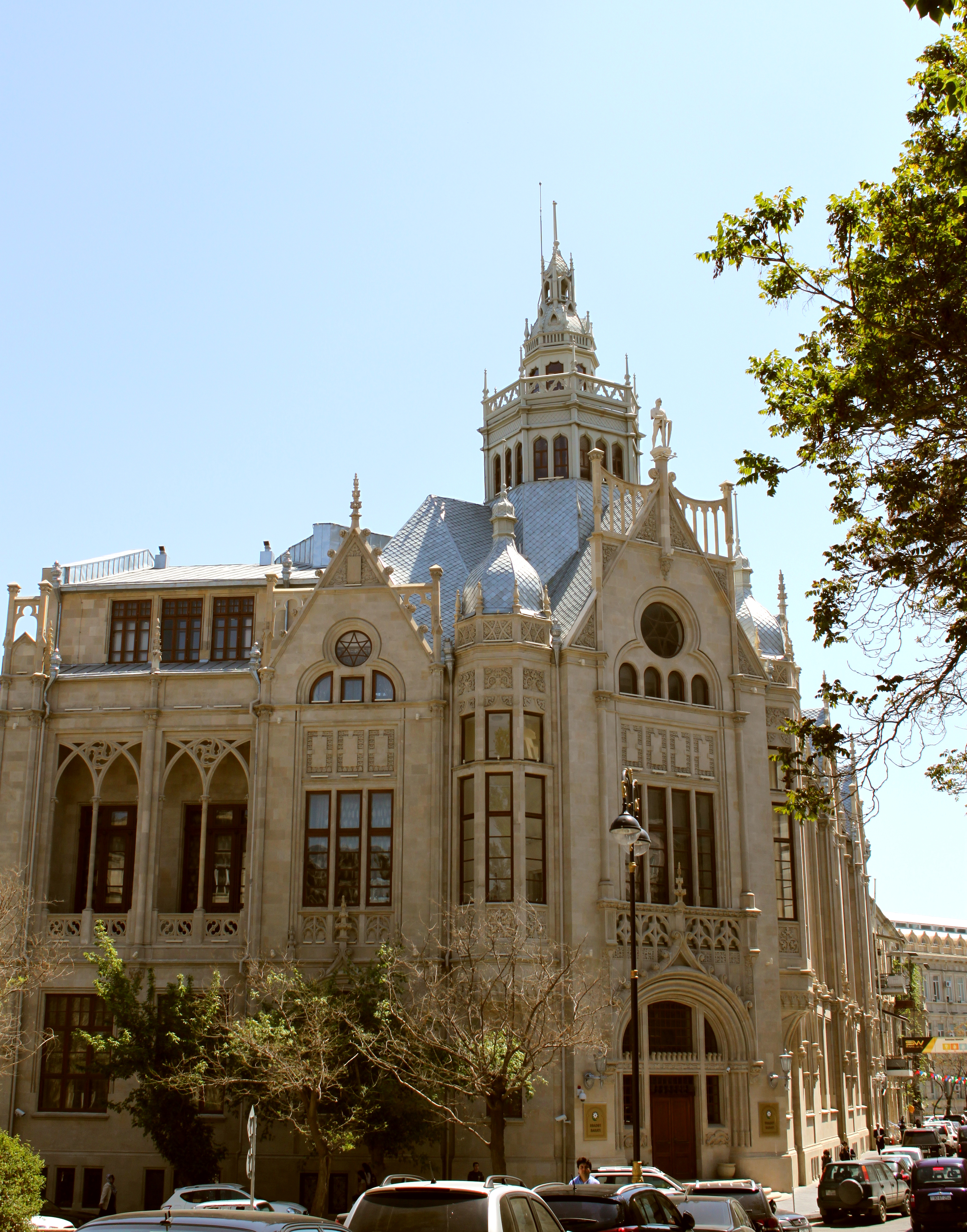
Palace of Happiness and its citadel

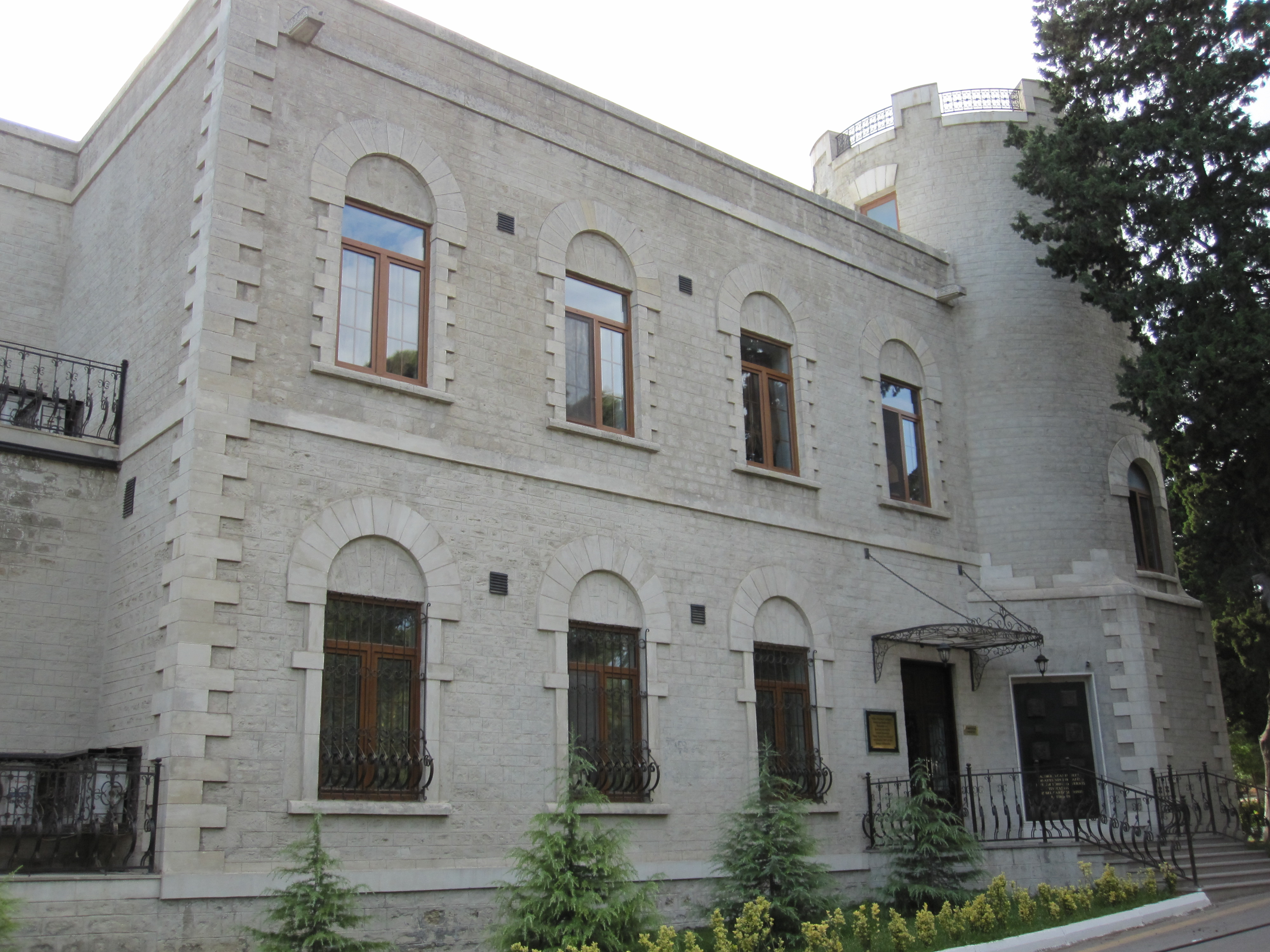
Villa Petrolea of Nobel Brothers in Baku

=== Old Era (BC 100–799) ===
- Residence of Zagulba – Full-time residence of the president of Azerbaijan.

=== Shirvanshahs Era (799–1539) ===
- Bika Khanum Saray
- Tamar Malayka Palace – consist of two saray: Alchichak and Naslijahan Khanum

Khanates of the Caucasus:

- Baku Khans' Palace – is a complex of several houses belonged to members of ruling family of Baku Khanate.
- Muhammadkhuba Khan Palace – former royal residence of Baku khans'

=== 19th–21st centuries ===
- Presidential Palace – official residence of the president of Azerbaijan.
- Villa Petrolea – built by the Petroleum Production Company Nobel Brothers
- Asena Palace – Full-time residence of the president of Azerbaijan.
- Palace of Happiness
- Palace of De Boure
- Ghazan Khan Palace – Residence of the president of Azerbaijan in Mərdəkan.
- Gulustan Palace
- Atlas Palace
- House of Sadykhov brothers
- Government House – is a government building housing various state ministries of Azerbaijan
- "Subh" Mer Palace
- Receipts Building
- "Tarkhan" Shaykh al-Islām Palace
- Bagh Evi
- Tagiev's Villa
- Palace of Zeynalabdin Taghiyev
- Griffin House
- Tajir Palace
- Azizbekov's Villa

== Icheri Sheher ==
- Haji Gayib's Palace
- Imaratgah Ibrahim II Shaykhshah
- Palace of the Shirvanshahs – official and full-time residence of leaders of Shirvanshahs during XIII-XVI AD centuries
- Seyid Mirbabayev's Palace – Today is Head office of SOCAR
- Ismailiyya Palace

== Karabakh ==
- Natavan's Summer Palace – Khankendi
- Lekh Castle – palace in Kalbajar.
- Mahammad Agha Palace – Khankendi
- Bayat Castle – Tartar District.
- Sarai Hamza Sultan – Lachin District.
- Haji Gulu's House – Shusha
- Gulustan Palace – Khankendi
- Capital Palace – Barda
- Bey Palace – Aghdam
- Presidential Palace – Khankendi
- Panahguly Palace – Khankendi
- Shahbulag Castle Palace – Aghdam.
- Agha Gahraman Mirsiyab Saray
- Natavan's Palace – Shusha
- Ibrahim Khalil Khan palace - Shusha District

== Nakhchivan Autonomous Republic ==
- Vanand Palace – Nakhchivan
- "Goyalp" Palace of Eldiguzid Empire Atabegs – Nakhchivan.
- Hasanguly Khaganate Palace – Nakhchivan.
- Khan Imarat – Nakhchivan.
- Bullur Palace – Sharur.
- Mammadguluzadehs' Palace – Nakhchivan.
- Mehmanabad Reception House – Nakhchivan.
- Nagsh Palace – official and full-time residence of the president of Nakhchivan Autonomous Republic.

== Ganja ==
- Javad Khan Palace
- Bulutan Presidential Palace
- Yur Khanate Palace
- Fazlali Palace – Shaddadids
- Khamsa Mer House
- Governor Palace

== Goygol ==
- Teodor Palace
- Göy Saray (Blue) Presidential Autumn Palace – Goygol – the country's most famous presidential palace.

== Shamakhi ==
- Vahdat Presidential Summer Palace
- "Mazyad" Administrator's Palace

== Shaki ==
- Palace of Shaki Khans
- Shakikhanovs' House
- Amirane Palace
- "Yagut" Governor Palace
- Pari Khatun's Igamatgah – consist of two palaces – Karkuk and Revan (1533)

== Shamkir ==
- Achaemenid Empire Palace – in Shamkir District.
- Palace of Sultanate of Shamshaddil
- Caucasian Royal Palace
- Rest Palace of Soviet Azerbaijan – for members of Political Bureau

== Quba ==
- Khanate Building
- Jovhar Palace – is a residential palace of Mer

== Elsewhere ==
- Aibaniz Palace – Kazakh
- Safavid Khan Palace – Lankaran
- Agha Palace – Salyan
- Javadguly Palace – Sabirabad
- Nodar Church-Palace – Oghuz
- Presidential Mountain Palace – Gabala – Rest residence of the president of Azerbaijan.
- Sultan Palace – Yevlakh
