= Fantasia bath =

- Azerbaijani: Fantaziya hamamı Russian: Ванна Фантазия
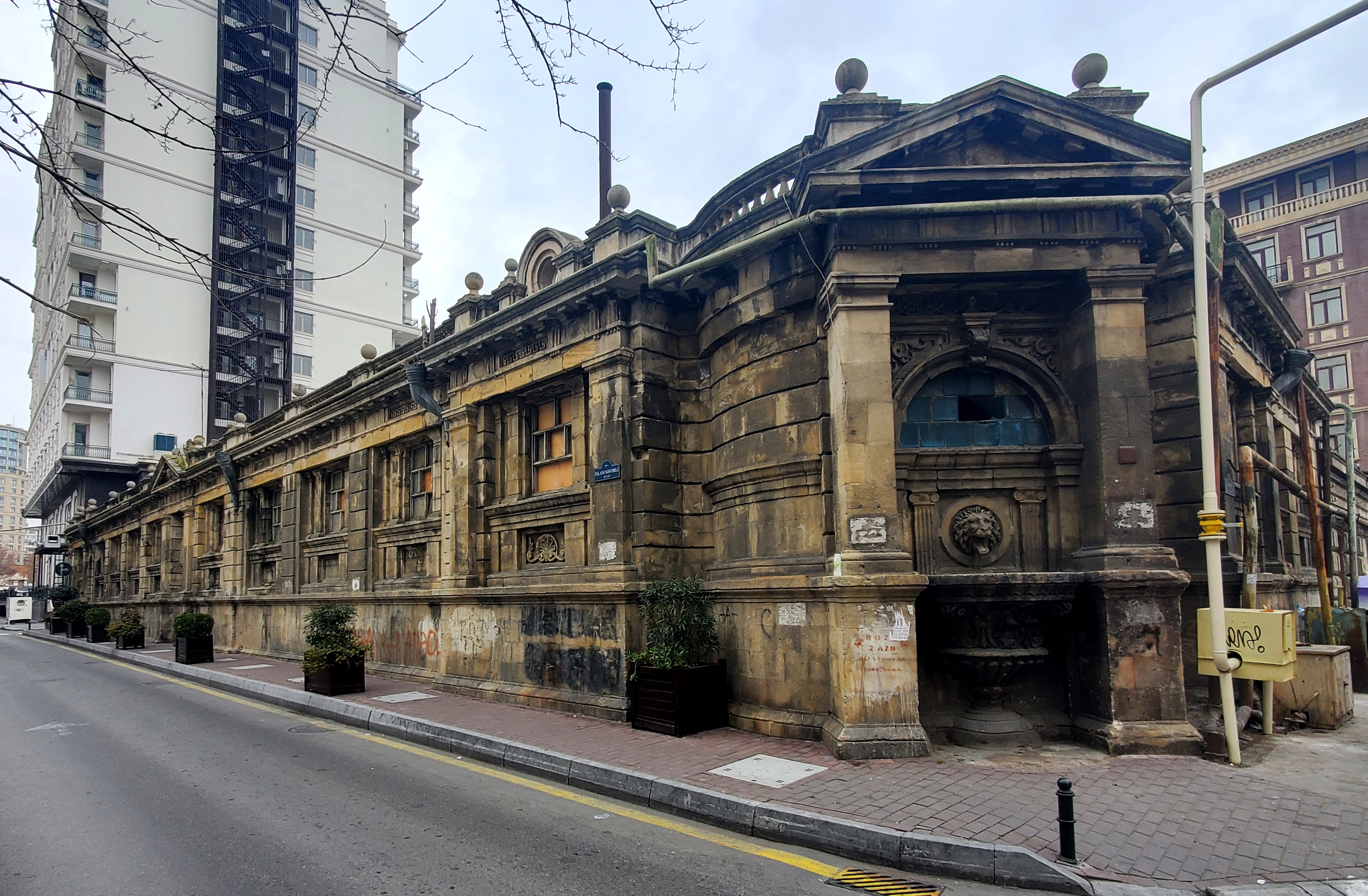

General information
- Type: Bath
- Location: Baku, Azerbaijan, Dilara Aliyeva Street 114, Baku
- Completed: 1896

Design and construction
- Architect: Nikolaus von der Nonne

Fantasia bath — a bath dating back to 1896, located on Dilara Aliyeva Street in Baku. It was the first commercial building with an electric line in the city and one of the first European-style baths in Baku, having been built by Russian architect Nikolaus von der Nonne.

The bathhouse was included in the list of immovable historical and cultural monuments of local importance by decision No. 132 of the Cabinet of Ministers of the Republic of Azerbaijan on August 2, 2001.

== About ==
=== Early period ===
Fantasia bath was built in Baku in 1896 at the intersection of Dilara Aliyeva, Vidadi and Islam Safarli streets. The architect was Nikolaus von der Nonne, who developed the first master plan of Baku city. There is no information about its customer as well as the first owner. Opened to users on January 13, 1897, the bath was the first commercial building in Baku with an electric line. Not only the interior, but also the facade of the building was illuminated with electricity. The bathhouse also had a phone number, which was rare for its time. Colored lamps illuminated the fountain located in the corridor.

There was no water pipeline in Baku until 1914. Therefore, a large supply of water was needed to supply the bath with water. Sometimes "Fantasia" was even closed to collect a few days' resource of water.

After the opening of the bath, on May 14, 1897, in an article written about it in the "Kaspi" newspaper, the author wrote that the owner would not be able to withdraw the investment, citing the fact that the Fantasia bath was built very luxuriously. He wrote:

The majority of Baku capitalists prefer to invest 30 percent of their capital in oil companies that give dividends. Considering the perfection and strength of their technical equipment, special water supply system, etc., the owner of the bathhouse is unlikely to get 4 percent income.

The bathroom also had a special hall for drinking tea after bathing. In addition, there were tea tables in the inner courtyard of "Fantasia". The walls and floor of the building were also made of marble. Inside the bathroom, there was a bathtub carved out of one whole marble, many artificial patterns, angels, Greek gods all over the walls, and oriental and Roman wall patterns on the ceiling. About twenty lackeys and waiters and as many housekeepers worked in the bathhouse. The service also offered Russian and French newspapers and magazines for reading.

Live music was also played here, and in 1900 it was replaced by the fashionable phonograph.

=== During the Soviet occupation ===
After the April occupation in 1920, they removed the equipment that could be sold from the building and sold it. Even the marbles in some parts of the bathroom were dismantled. The building was used as a military hospital for a while, and then as a school. At the end of the 1920s, the bathhouse was restored and put into use according to its purpose.

=== After independence ===
After Azerbaijan regained its independence, Fantasia bath was included in the list of immovable historical and cultural monuments of local importance by decision No. 132 issued by the Cabinet of Ministers of the Republic of Azerbaijan on August 2, 2001. The building functioned as a bathhouse until the early 2010s. In 2012, the film "Don't be afraid, I'm with you! 1919" was shot. In the film, it is possible to see the main hall of the bathhouse with a fountain.

Although the building is under the protection of the state, it is privately owned. After 2012, it was completely inactive. The building of the inactive bathhouse is in a state of disrepair. In different years, citizens collected signatures to restore the bath and prevent its demolition and tried to attract the attention of relevant institutions.

From November 1 to 10, 2018, the "Fantasy Cultural Heritage Festival" was held in Baku by the European Union. The festival was held to increase interest in Baku's cultural heritage and preserve it. The festival got its name from the Fantasia bath. In 2019, the II "Fantasia" Cultural Heritage Festival was held in Ganja.

In 2018, Azermarka issued a stamp dedicated to the Fantasia bath.

In 2022, the owner of the building fenced off the bath to start a new construction in its place. Thanks to the intervention of the public and the Union of Architects of Azerbaijan, the demolition was prevented, and the fences built around it were dismantled, and an act was drawn up against the owner.

== Gallery ==
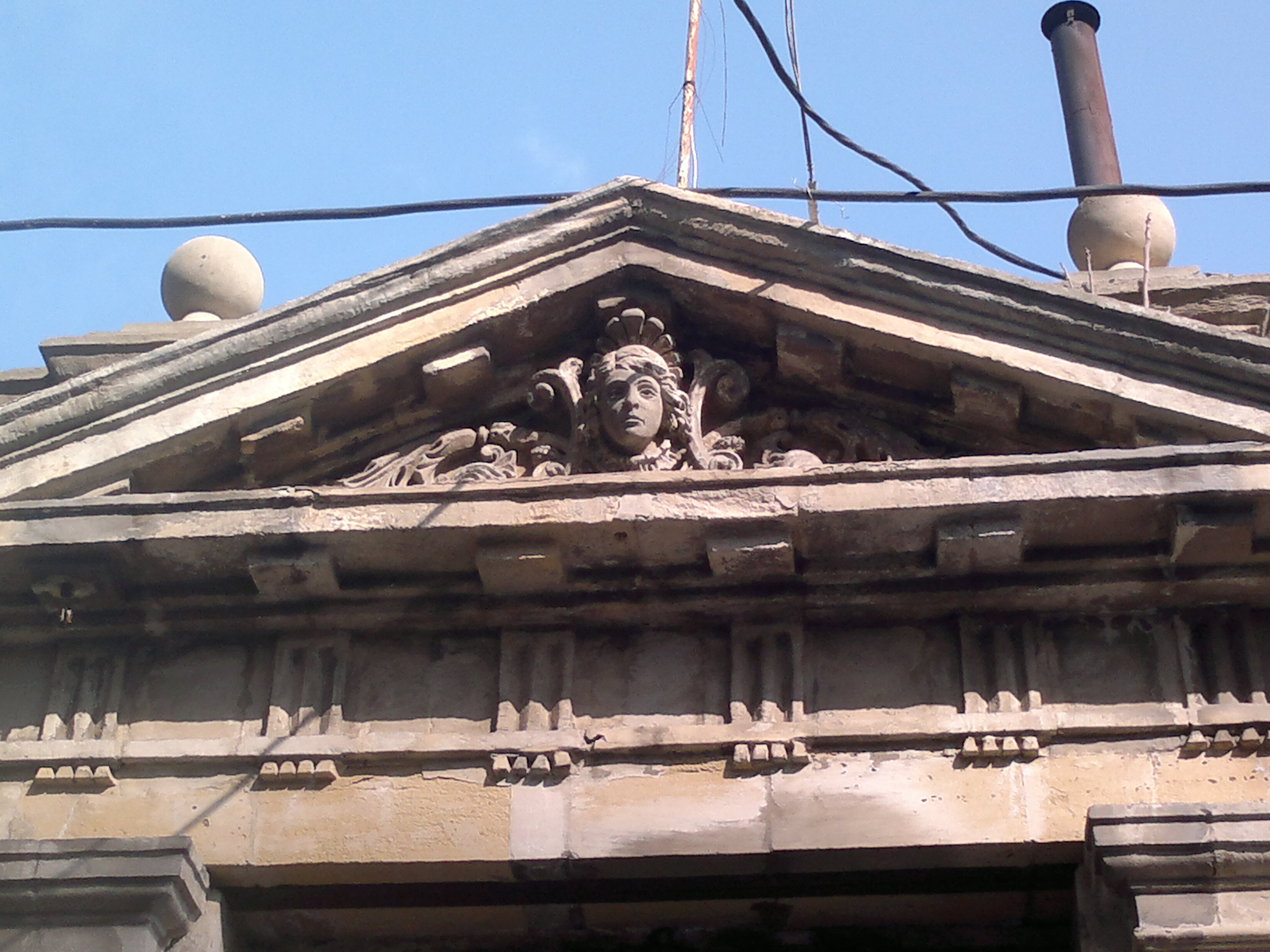

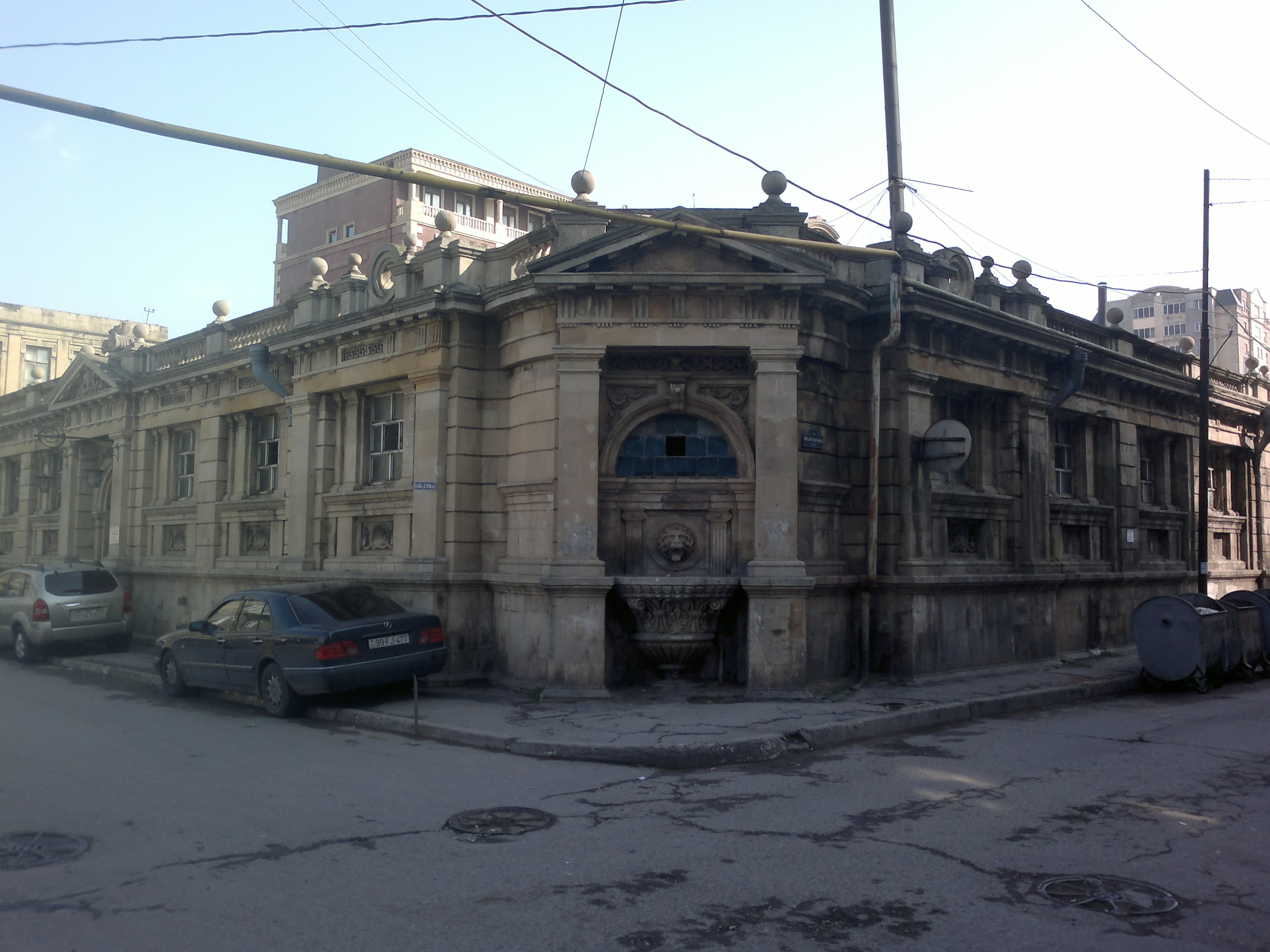

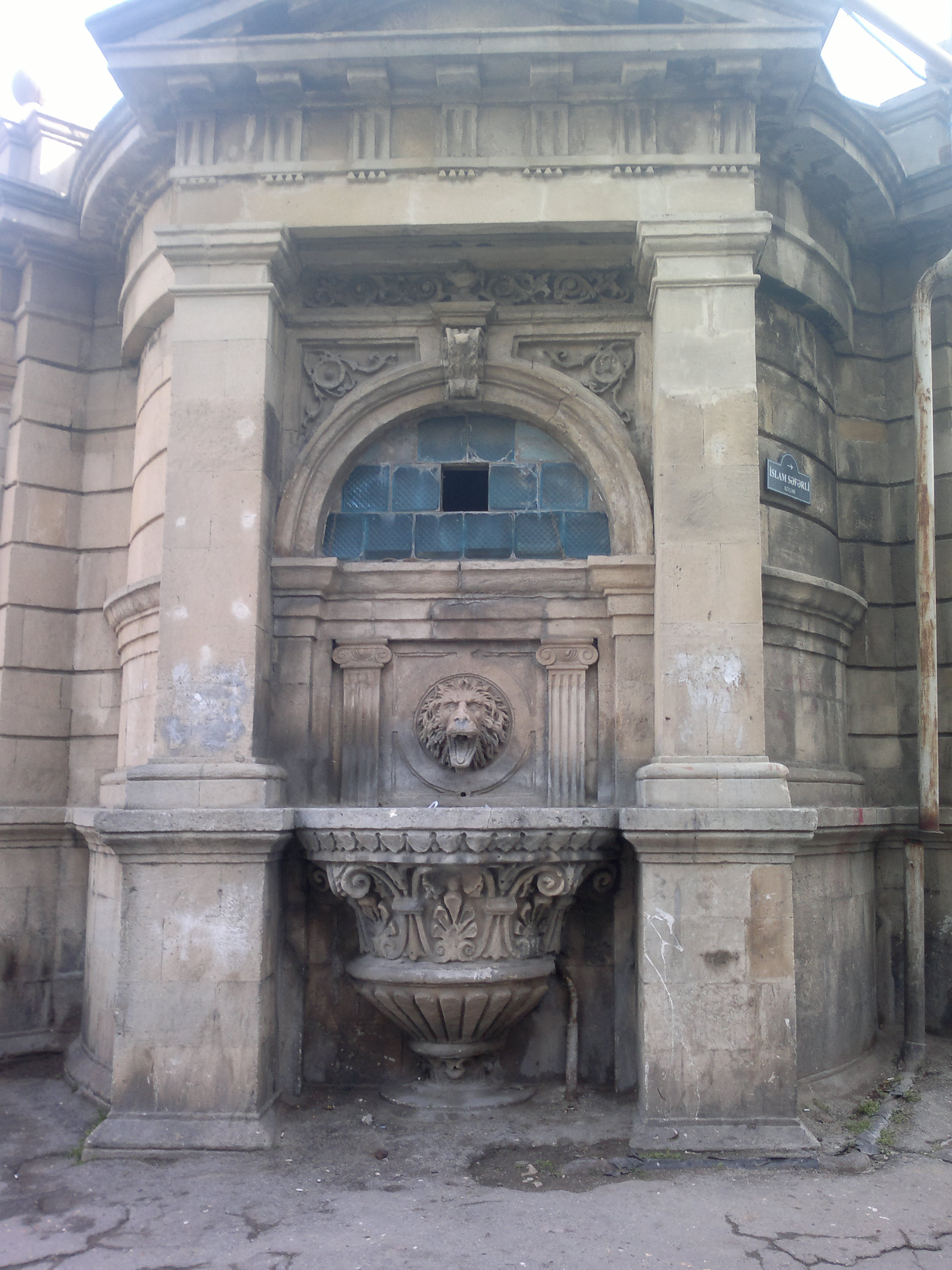

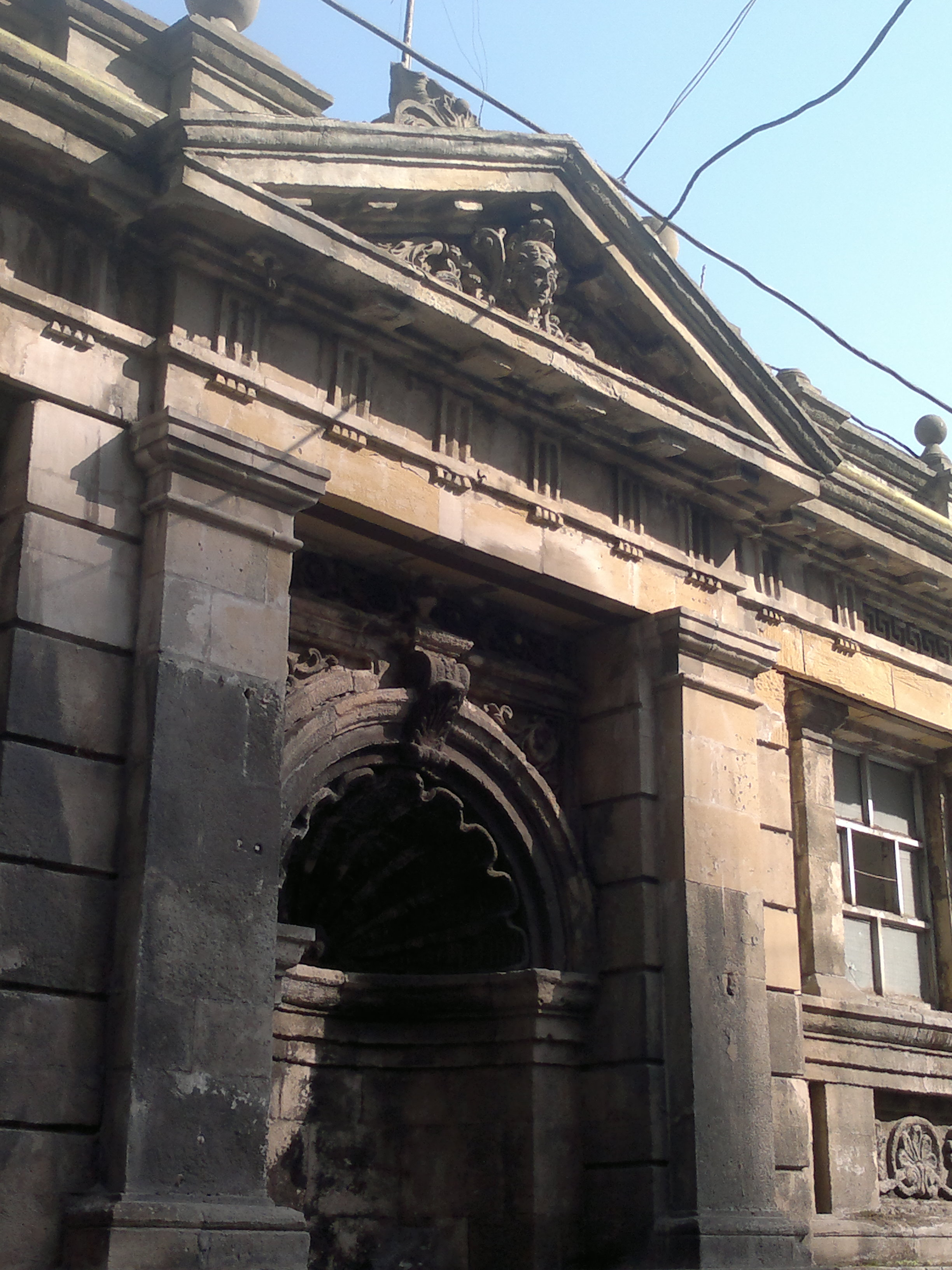

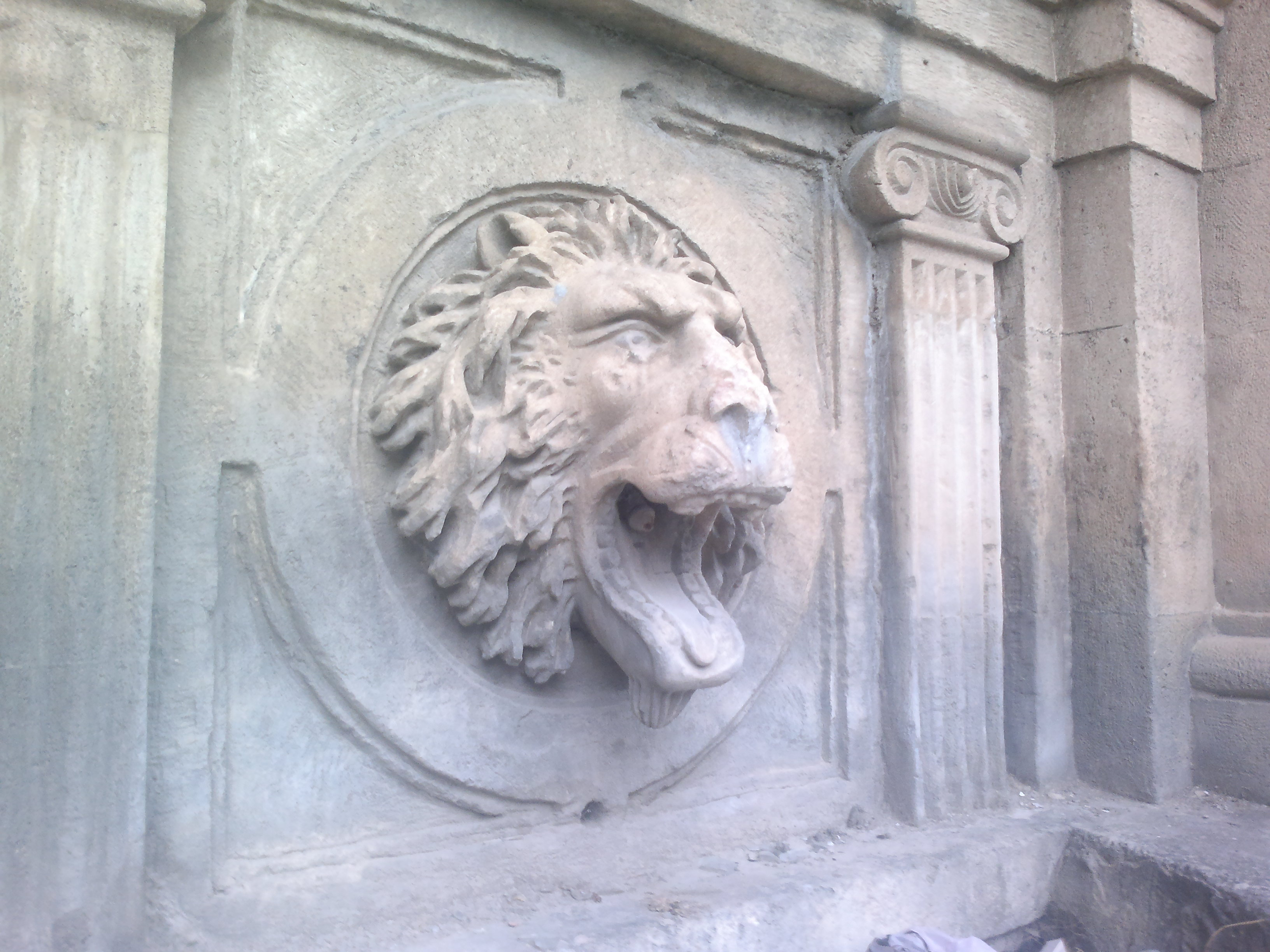

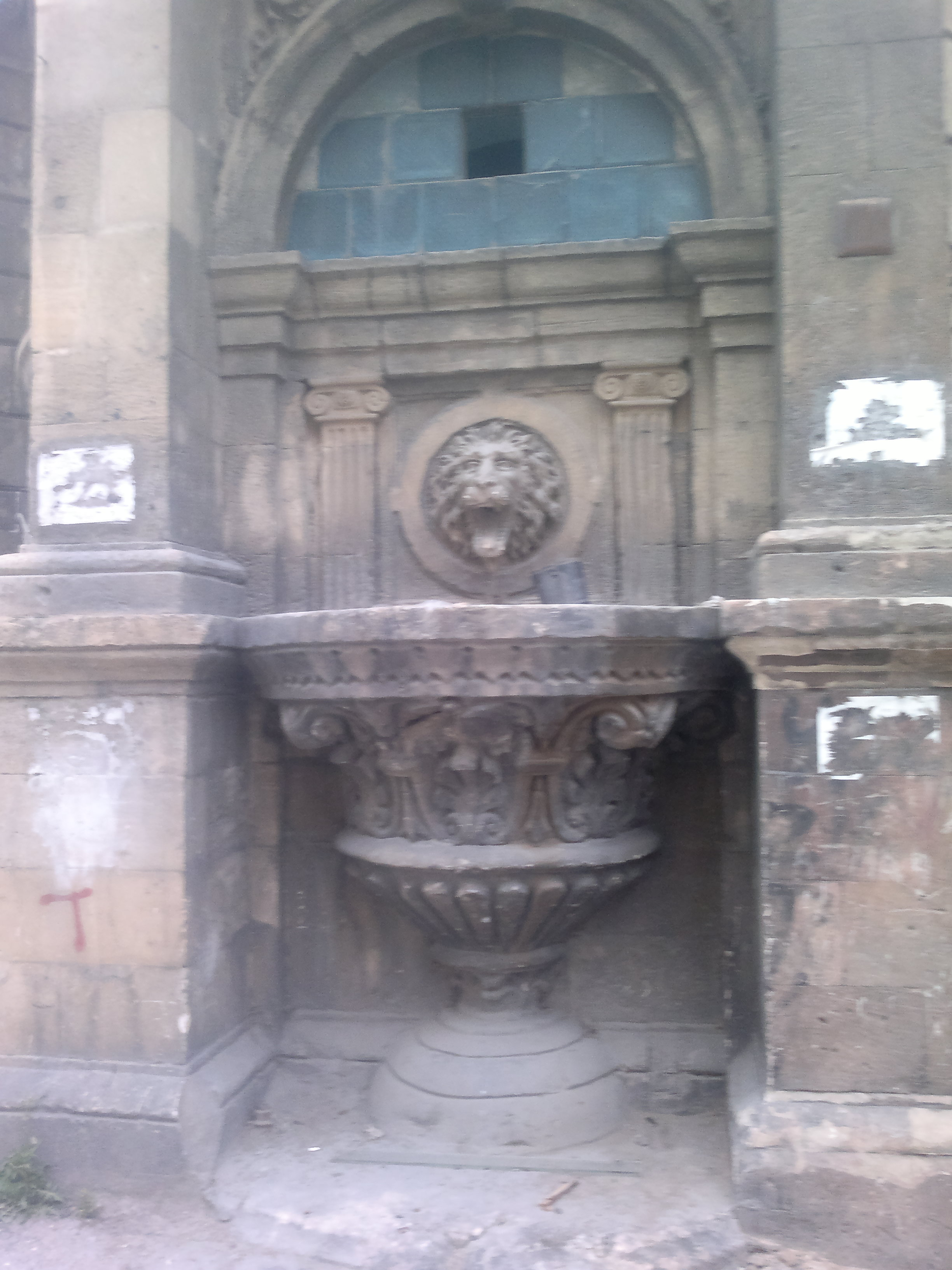

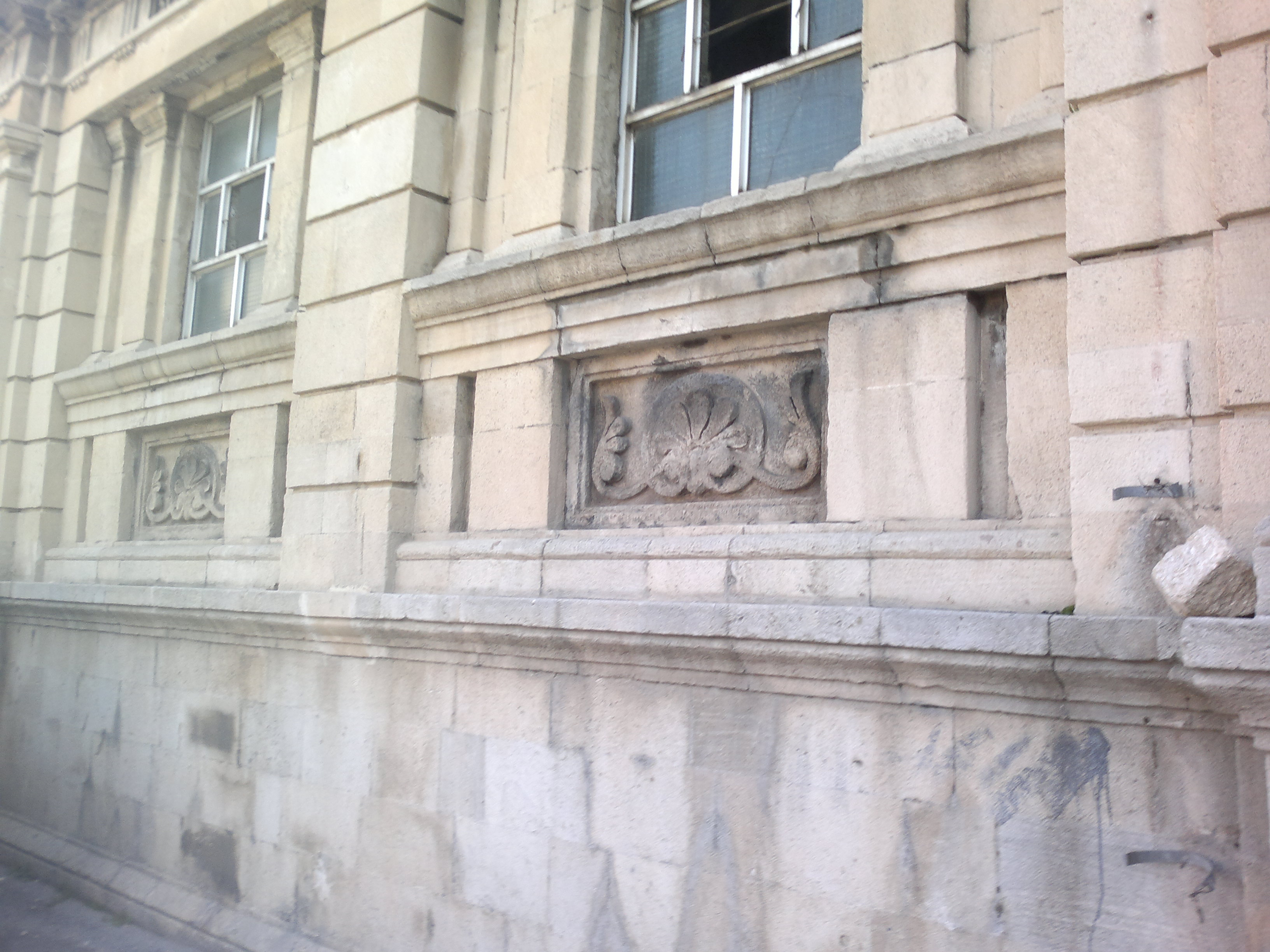

== See also ==
- Underground Bath
- Agha Mikayil Bath
- Haji Gayib bathhouse
