= Nikolaus von der Nonne =

German-Russian architect (1836–1908)

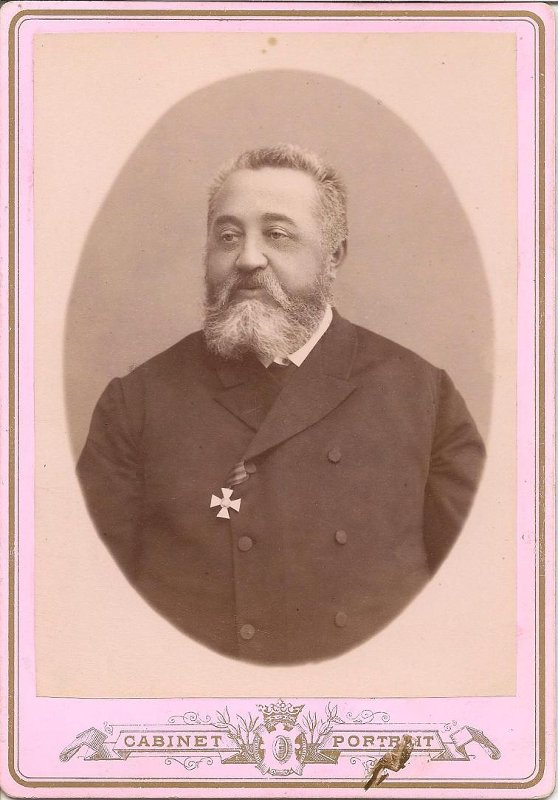
- Von der Nonne in 1890s

Mayor of Baku
- In office 4 November 1898 – 21 March 1901
- Preceded by: Mikhail Belyavsky
- Succeeded by: Mikhail Belyavsky

Personal details
- Born: 16 June 1836 Saint Petersburg Governorate, Russian Empire
- Died: 13 August 1908 (aged 72) Tiflis, Tiflis Governorate, Russian Empire
- Parents: Johann Georg August Ernst von der Nonne (father); Anna von Tornau (mother)
- Awards: Order of St. George (4th class)

Military service
- Allegiance: Russia
- Rank: Colonel
- Battles/wars: Crimean War; Caucasian War

Nikolaus August Ernst von der Nonne (Russian: Николай Августович фон дер Нонне; 1836–1906) was a Russian engineer of ethnic German origin. He was an urban engineer of Baku and served as the mayor of Baku from 1898 to 1901.

== Early life ==
He was born on 16 June 1836 to ethnic German family in Saint Peterburg Governorate. His father, Johann Georg August Ernst von der Nonne (1798–1860), was a German nobleman originally from the city of Bodenwerder, Lower Saxony. His mother, Anna (1810–1891), belonged to the baronial family of von Tornau. He adhered to Lutheranism. He also had several brothers and sister, namely Alexander Johann August Ernst (b. 1831), Friedrich August Ernst (b. 1836), Michael (1839–1919) and Anna (married Eugen Alexander von Ovander in 1864). His brother Michael von der Nonne was Yerevan's urban architect.

== Career ==
=== Military career ===
Nikolaus was educated in the First Cadet Corps in St. Petersburg, after which on 11 June 1855 he was promoted to officer and assigned to the 6th Sapper Battalion, which at that time participated in Crimean War and the siege of Sevastopol. In 1856, he was transferred to the military service in the Caucasus, participating in the Caucasian War. He received the Order of St. George (4th class) on 8 September 1859 as a poruchik for building bridges during the siege the village of Shauri.

He served as staff captain from 1864 to 1865 and as adjutant of the 1st Caucasian Sapper Battalion. Von der Nonne also served as the acting head of the department of the staff of the chief engineer of the Military Engineering Department of the Caucasian Army. From 1866 to 1868, he was senior adjutant to the chief engineer of the District Engineering Department and a staff captain. He was promoted to captain in 1869. At the end of 1869, von der Nonne was assigned to the Main Administration of the Viceroy of the Caucasus and seconded to the Construction and Road Committee under the same administration.

Between 1870 and 1873, he was promoted to be engineer-captain. From 1873 to 1877, he was a lieutenant colonel in charge of the Tiflis–New-Agstafa road; full member of the Caucasian Branch of the Russian Technical Society (CBRTS), member of the CBRTS Council (workshop inspector).

From 1878 to 1880, he served as head of the Tiflis-Gombori–Telavi Road of the Highway Administration under the Construction and Road Committee of the Quarantine-Customs Department in the Caucasus and beyond. In 1880, he was promoted to the rank of colonel (seniority from 16 January 1880). In 1881, he was appointed as the provincial engineer of the Construction Department of the Provincial Board of the Baku Governorate, continuing to be listed among the engineering troops.

=== Administrative career ===
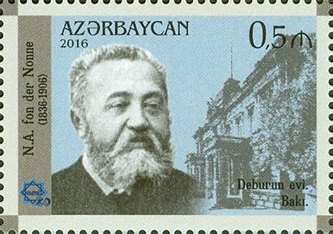
Von der Nonne on Azerbaijan stamp, 2016

In August 1883, von der Nonne transferred to the service in the city duma, where he was appointed chief urban engineer at the Baku city government. On 18 January 1884, he was elected chairman of the Baku branch of the Russian Technical Society.

Von der Nonne participated in preparing the economic aspects of the congress of oil industrialists (October 1884), and also made a report at the congress on the improvement of Black City. He promoted the issue of creating and publishing scientific notes of the Society, which did not develop due to the lack of necessary financial support.

Most importantly, von der Nonne became the first city engineer of Baku to actively address the issue of Baku's sanitation and develop a project for creating a city sewage system. He gave his very first report on this topic at a Russian Technical Society meeting in March 1884, in which he spoke about the connection between the development of epidemics and soil pollution. In his report, he presented a picture of the sanitary condition of Baku, talked about the methods used in Baku for removing sewage, and how they could be improved. The report aroused great interest among the members of the Society, a large discussion ensued, the participants of which concluded that the creation of such a project would be possible only after accurate data on the number of urban population were collected. Von der Nonne continued to think and work on this important topic for Baku. In August 1884, at a meeting of the joint sanitary commission, he presented his interesting work - a plan of Baku with all branches of city drainage ditches, laid without any system.

He was dismissed from service for domestic reasons with a uniform and a pension by the Imperial Order on 18 November 1884. Later that year, at the suggestion of Ludwig Nobel, he prepared for the first time a report on sewerage Sanitation of Baku by means of sewerage and presented it on 31 May 1884, at a meeting of the Technical Society. In June, a Joint Sanitary Commission was created under the Society under his chairmanship.

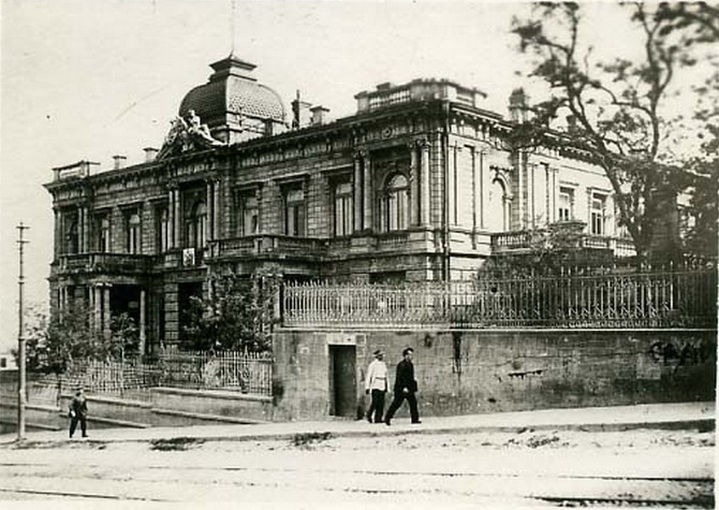
Palace of De Bour, 1930

As a civil engineer, he participated in the construction of three barracks (or three buildings) at the Mikhailovskaya Hospital, a disinfection chamber, an oil storage facility of the "Caspian Partnership" with a capacity of up to one million poods, and the building of the Mariinsky Women's Gymnasium, where he installed one of the first model water closets in Baku, for which he was given an official commendation. From July 1885 to 1887, he prepared a project, plan, and built the building of the Baku Society of Mutual Credit, which has survived to this day. On 31 August 1888, he developed and approved the project of a building known in the city as Palace of De Boure. Currently, the State Museum of Fine Arts of Azerbaijan is located there.

He personally met Alexander III during his visit to Baku on October 8–10, 1888.

He carried out the construction of the embankment, created a plan for rebuilding the Real School building, he headed a special commission in connection with work on the search for fresh water in Absheron by engineer Otto Lenz, as an expert determined disputed areas of city land and drew up plans of this area, and also under his supervision and leadership, 50,000 fathoms of streets were paved by contract and 17,000 by economic means. In July 1891, he completed and put into operation the Cemetery Road. He was the architect and builder of numerous private and state buildings in the city.

He submitted a petition to the city government to dismiss him from service due to illness on 15 September 1894, but only in October 1894 he left the city service.

== Later years and death ==
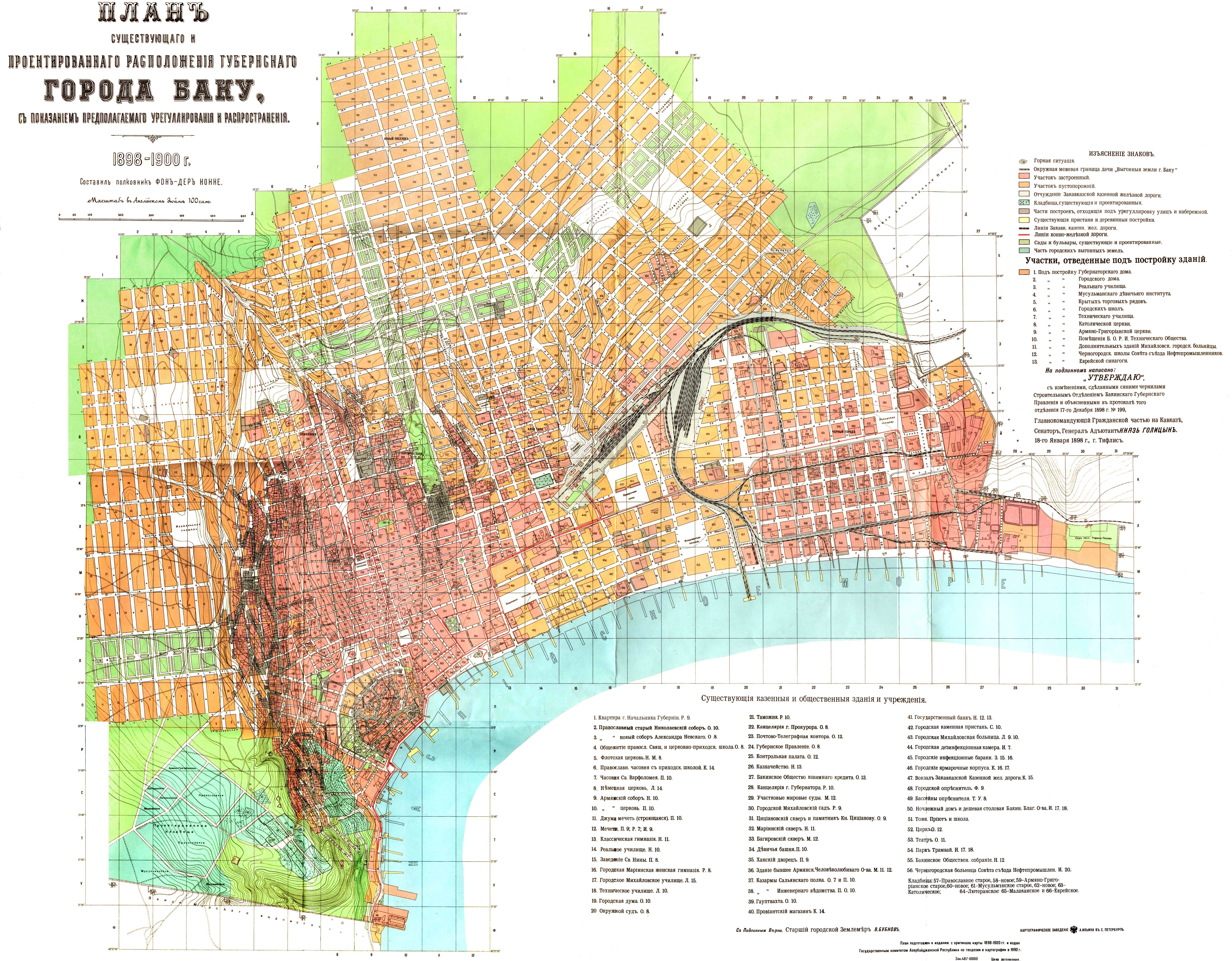
City plan of Baku 1898 as drawn by Nonne

From this time on, von der Nonne engaged in private activities; he planned and built many different buildings in Baku. In 1895, he built himself a modest one-story building with five apartments. At the beginning of 1897, the City Duma asked him to draw up a general plan for the city of Baku. The work was completed by October 1898 and approved by the planning commission. After additions by the Construction Department of the Baku Provincial Government, the plan was approved by the Baku governor Rogge. On 18 January 1899, the Plan of the existing and projected layout of the provincial city of Baku with an indication of the proposed regulation and expansion (1898–1900) was approved by the Commander-in-Chief of the Civil Part in the Caucasus Grigory Golitsyn. By the time of the development of the general plan of Baku in 1898, the quarters located to the north of the Baku fortress were implemented in the form of a clear rectangular grid. According to von der Nonne's plan, the projected area doubled the city's planned area.

In October 1898, he was elected as the head of the City Duma, and on 30 October, he was confirmed by Grigory Golitsyn in this position for a four-year term. On November 4, von der Nonne officially took up the position of city mayor. He was also an honorary Justice of the Peace in 1901, Chairman of Provincial Prison Committee, was a member of various commissions and societies (animal protection, etc.). But illness did not allow him to work actively, which caused dissatisfaction among the members of the City Duma.

On February 28, he submitted a resignation from the position of City Mayor. On 1 March 1901, at a meeting of the city duma, it was announced that the city mayor had applied for resignation due to illness. He moved to Tiflis in 1903 with his wife. He died on 13 August 1908, aged 72 in Tiflis and was buried in Stavropol, next to his parents.

== Family ==
He was married to ethnic Armenian from Tiflis, Maria Pavlovna von der Nonne (née Bashinjaghova). She wrote several plays like Not All That Glitters Is Gold (Russian: Не все золото, что блестит, 1884); Grandmother's Stories (Russian: Бабушкины рассказы, 1890); Trifles (Russian: Пустяки, 1894). Her sister Ekaterina Pavlovna was married to a military engineer, the City Mayor of Elizavetpol, Major General Ivan Kognowicki. They had several children:

1. Nikolai von der Nonne (4 March 1862 – 1919) – colonel of the Imperial Russian Army, married Olga Belkina (1864-1935)
2. Vladimir von der Nonne (3 January 1872 – ?)
3. Konstantin von der Nonne (d. 20 December 1917) – worked in the Office of the Transcaucasian Railway
4. Zoa von der Nonne
5. Maria von der Nonne – married Vladimir Chikalin (b. 1853), lieutenant-general of the Imperial Russian Army
