= Ibrahim Khalil Khan palace =

Historical palace in Shusha, Azerbaijan

- Azerbaijani: İbrahimxəlil xan sarayı
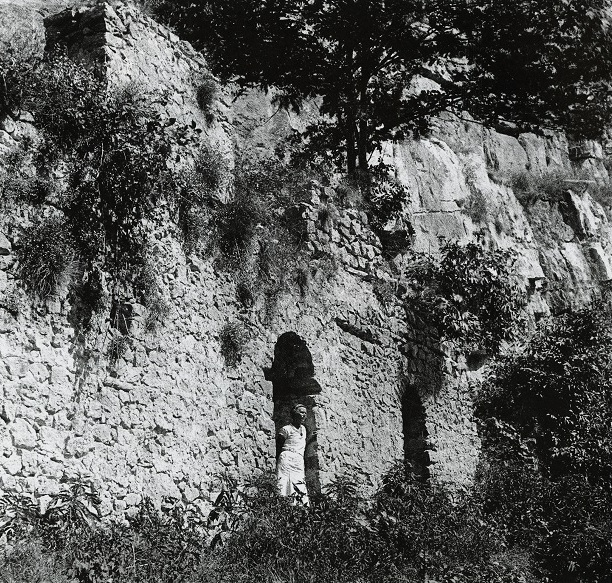
- Fortress walls surrounding the palace complex of Ibrahim Khalil Khan
- Interactive map of the Ibrahim Khalil Khan palace area
- Alternative names: Palace of Karabakh Khans

General information
- Location: Shusha State Historical and Architectural Reserve, Shusha, Azerbaijan
- Coordinates: 39.7577°N 46.7591°E
- Construction started: 1751
- Construction stopped: 1753
- Client: Panah Ali Khan

Ibrahim Khalil Khan palace (Azerbaijani: İbrahimxəlil xan sarayı) or Ibrahim Khalil Khan castle (Azerbaijani: İbrahimxəlil xanın qəsri) is a historical palace located in the south-eastern part of Shusha, near Dashalty village. In some sources, the palace is also called palace of Karabakh Khans.

An architectural monument of national importance registered in Azerbaijan.

== History ==
It was built in 1751-1753 by the order of Panah Ali Khan. The palace was damaged after the Armenian occupation of Shusha in May 1992. On November 8, 2020, the city was liberated.

== About ==
Ibrahim Khalil Khan palace was a square building and was surrounded on four sides by castle walls. Semicircular towers open from inside are located at four corners of castle walls. Servants who served the people living in the palace lived in the residential buildings connected to the towers, inside the palace.

The main entrance to the north of the castle is protected by a prismatic volume. From this point of view, the entrance of the castle repeats the technique applied at Ganja Gate of Shusha fortress. This type of construction technique strengthens the protection of the door and reduces the possibility of direct access to it to zero.

All the buildings included in the palace complex are covered with arches and ceilings made of small well-hewn stones.

Entrance door construction: door stone made of solid stone (2.40 x 0.70 x 0.45 m) stands on a door frame made of solid stone and 2.10 meters high. There is a relief arch made of well-hewn stones on the door frame. The tympanum of the arch is made of large rough stones with idol masonry. This kind of entrance doors is widespread in the architecture of Shusha.

== See also ==
- Ibrahim Khalil Khan
- Panah Ali Khan
- Shusha State Historical and Architectural Reserve
- Karabakh Khanate

== Source ==
- Авалов, Э. В. (1977). Архитектура города Шуши и проблемы сохранения его исторического облика. Баку: Элм.
- Саркисов, А. В.; Ализаде, А. М. (1950). О некоторых архитектурных памятниках Шуши (Памятники архитектуры Азербайджана (сборник материалов), т. II ed.). Москва-Баку.
- Фатуллаев, Ш. С. (1970). Памятники Шуши. Баку.
- Саламзаде, А. В. (1964). Архитектура Азербайджана XVI-XIX вв.. Баку.
- Дубровин, Н. (1886). История войны и владычества русских на Кавказе (т.3 ed.). СПб.
