= Palace of De Boure =

Historic palace of the 19th century in Baku, Azerbaijan

- Azerbaijani: De Burun sarayı Russian: Дворец Де Буре
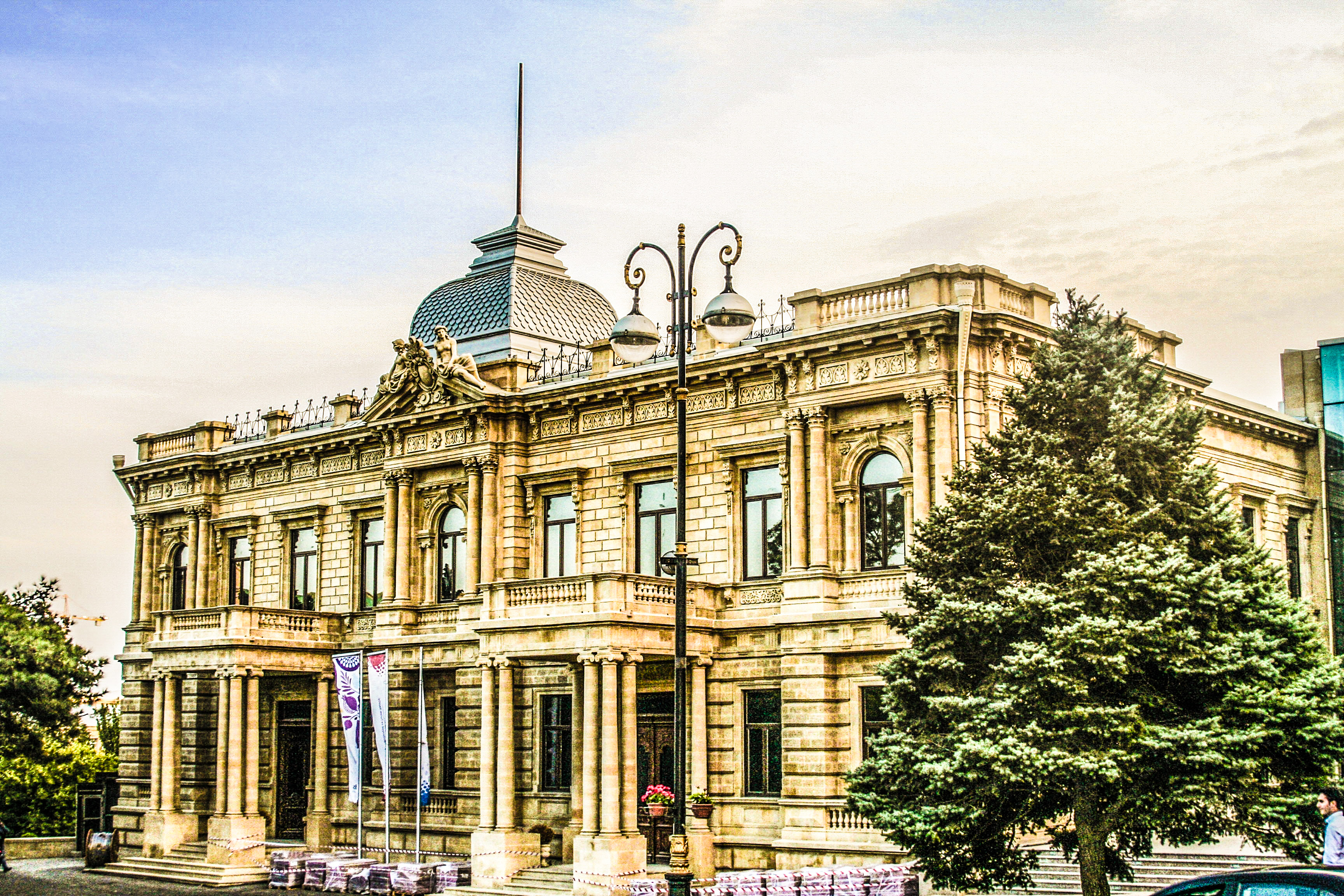
- Main facade of the Palace of De Boure

- Location within Azerbaijan

General information
- Status: Used as National Art Museum of Azerbaijan
- Type: Mansion
- Architectural style: Baroque architecture
- Location: Niyazi Street, 9, Baku, Azerbaijan
- Coordinates: 40°21′47″N 49°49′54″E
- Construction started: 1891
- Completed: 1895
- Client: Leo De Boure

Technical details
- Floor count: 2

Design and construction
- Architect: Nikolaus von der Nonne

Palace of De Boure is a palace built by order of Leo De Boure, one of the oil millionaires of Baku in the 19th century and the business manager for Baron Rothschild's company. The palace is located on Niyazi street (formerly Sadovaya) facing Azerbaijan State Philharmonic Hall. It was built on the project of Russian architect Nicholas von der Nonne in 1891–1895.

== History ==
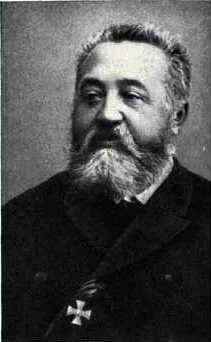
Architect of the palace, Nicholas von der Nonne

On February 26, 1888, Leo De Boure (1840–1889), the oil magnate, founder of "Caspian Partnership" Joint Stock Company and millionaire, appealed to the Baku City Council for approval of a two-storied stone palace plan, which he wanted to build. On April 18, 1888, an agreement on the allocation of 700 square meters of land was obtained on Sadovaya Street (present Niyazi Street). On August 26, urban engineer Nicholas von der Nonne and city architect, construction engineer Anton Kandinov confirm the plan of the palace. But architect A. Kandinov does not have the signature in the architectural project of the palace, and Nicholas von der Nonne is considered the only architect of the palace. On August 31, 1888, project of construction of the palace was approved by the Mayor of Baku, Stanislav Despot-Zenovich and a member of the executive board, L. Nikulin. Soon the construction work began.

=== Property of Caspian Society ===
De Boure died in 1889 before the construction of the building was completed. His successors sold a groundbreaking building to the “Caspian Partnership” Joint Stock Company in January 1891 for 16,000 rubles. Thus, the building became the property of the Society. Therefore, architects had to make some changes in the initial plan of the building. On the main facade of the building, two exit doors were constructed. The balconies were opened on the Sadovaya Street side and Mikhailovsky Garden (now Vahid Garden) was the landscape from the balconies.

The history of construction of the building dates back to 1891 – 1893. It is also noted that palace of “Caspian Partnership” Joint Stock Company was completed in 1895. The building's medallion had a "KT" (the first letters of Caspian Partnership in Azerbaijani) abbreviation, but later it was destroyed during repair. In 1895, the co-founder of the Caspian Partnership Society, S. I. Baghirov died and his assistant Pavel Osipovich Gukasov replaced him. In 1896, one of the family members, the brother of chairman of Caspian Partnership Society, Arshak Osipovich Gukasov moved to the palace and settled in several rooms of it. In 1898, P. O. Gukasov and his family moved to this palace. It's also noted that a fire broke out in the palace during those years.

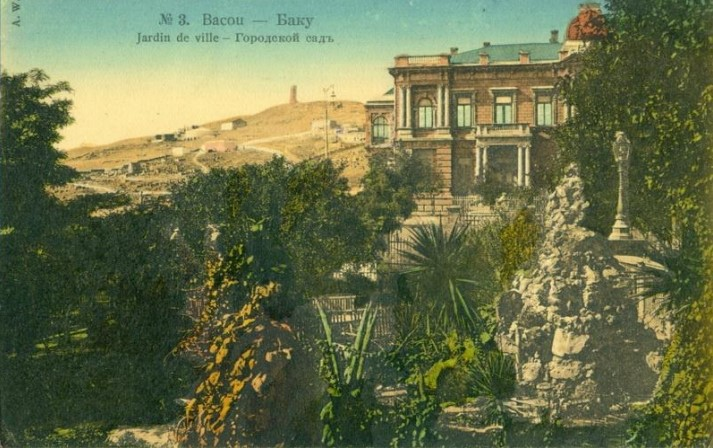
View of the palace from Governor's garden (now Philharmonic Garden), 1900s

=== Later period ===
After the October Revolution of 1917, on July 31, 1918, with the active participation of British Consul E. McDonald, the government in Baku was passed from the Islamic Army of the Caucasus to Centrocaspian Dictatorship, which was invited to protect the city. In August 1919, the British army entered Baku. Following it, the headquarters of the British Command headed by General William Thomson was placed in the palace dedicated to Caspian Partnership. However, the family of the Gukasov family continued to live in the same palace.

After Red Army units entered Baku on April 28, 1920, Nariman Narimanov became the Chairman of the Revolutionary Committee of Azerbaijan. In 1921, he was elected chairman of the People's Commissars Council and council was placed at Palace of De Boure. Nariman Narimanov's family began to live on the second floor of the palace. After the death of N. Narimanov in 1925, Sadovaya Street was renamed N. Narimanov Street. From 1933, family of the first secretary of KGB, Mir Jafar Baghirov settled in the palace. In the 1930s a small reconstruction work was carried out in the palace, and on the left side a garden named after N. Narimanov was planted. In 1939 the street was renamed Chkalov Street. In 1951, M. Baghirov donated the palace to National Art Museum of Azerbaijan and the palace is still functioning as the first body of the museum.

== Architectural features ==
Floorplan of floors of Palace of De Boure

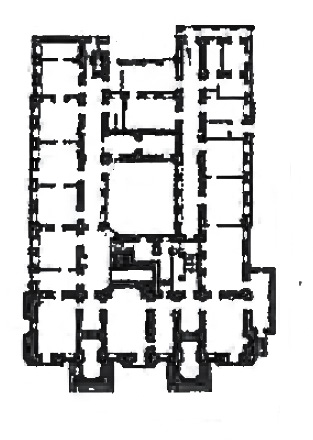
First floor

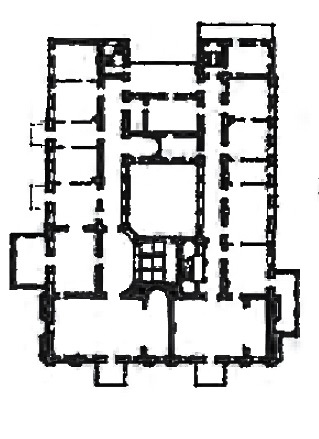
Second floor

The palace-type building built by Nicholas von der Nonne is his first and last attempt to use volume-spatial solution by actively using plastic tools. This is sole historical building, which is perceived as a three-dimensional construction of flat-sized buildings in Baku. After re-planning the surrounding areas of the city, De Boure's palace remained an exemplary building. Significant size and effective location make up a composite accent between successfully constructed buildings. It is noted that the quiet, horizontal divisions of the palace creates a harmony with the surrounding club building, Building of Mayoralty of Baku and verticals of the property of Sadikhov. During projection of the Palace of De Boure, the squares along the red lines of the street were empty. Concerning this, the architect, Nicholas von der Nonne, paid special attention to the harmony of buildings in the neighborhood while working on the project. Considering the special position of the palace and the location, closeness to the Caspian Sea, large and plastic solutions are interesting. The baroque-style architecture of the palace, the well-placed classic elements and the powerful plastic tools (porticoes) used in the background of building using unhewn stone have an important role.

During construction of the building, palaces built differently from local architectural schools that was formed for centuries, were just beginning to be built on the central streets of Baku. The classic symmetric-axis facade is applied in the architectural composition of De Boure's palace. In Baku, the European classics were developing from the 1880s, and this was the direction of Baku artists' creativity. They used all possibilities of classics to disclose the artistic manifestations of the structure of the building. While preparing for the master plan of Baku engineer Nicholas von der Nonne, put it in the construction of a circular trunk around Old City and designated the place of the palace.

=== Planning ===
The palace plan and architectural solution differs by industrialist tones: enfilade of the rooms are completed with hall chambers, the windows are facing the front facade. All rooms, including "Black" stairs and toilets, are lit up when air does. The exact system of capital walls is represented by one layered construction and constitutes basis of the carcass, which is connected to extensive corridors. The main stairs cover the north-western part of the quadratic yard area. At the end, the service (black) stairs are located. The left portico has access to the corridor. A three-quarter turn, triumphant marble staircase rises up from the right to the second floor, and discloses an interior. From the entrance, there is a marble two-quarter turn, an indoor-looking corner staircase. Both stairs combine the corridor in the style of enfilade. Palace of De Boure is considered one of the best objects in Baku with its architectural-plan and effectiveness.

=== Facade ===
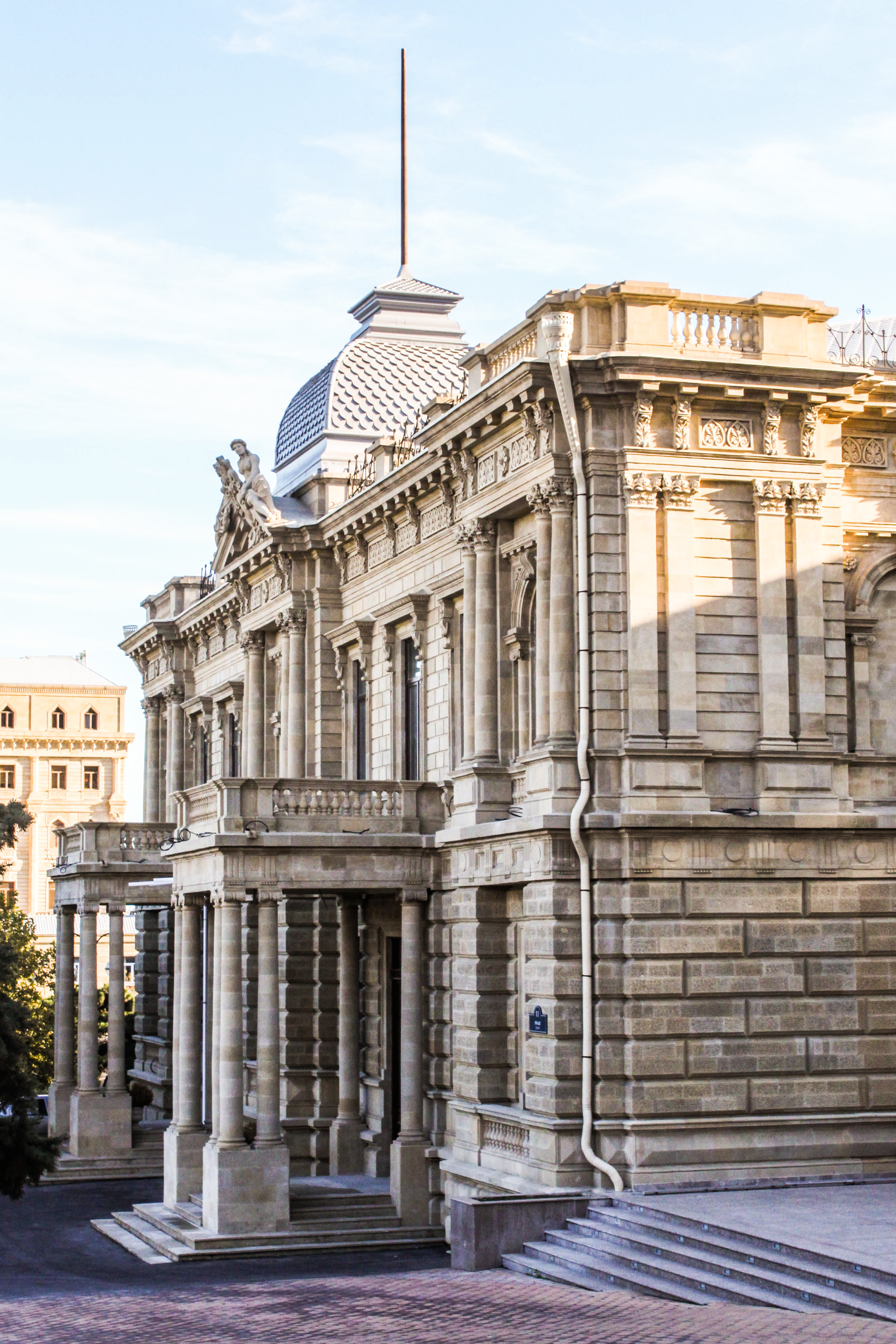
Profile view of main facade

Architect Nicholas von der Nonne worked in the construction of the modern center of Baku (late 19th century) and managed to incorporate his position in the development of city architecture. At that time due to dominance of two-dimensional buildings the city streets, which were not so wide, there was no interval between neighboring buildings. Seamless lanes in the spatial environment of different facades were dominant. Despite the appearance of facades, the monotony of buildings reduced the overall impact of the architecture of Baku streets. Implementation of the De Boure's palace in the favorable city structure played a positive role. in turn, the architect, N.A von der Nonne, determined the three-dimensional effect of the facade. The author included the concept of volume-spatial architecture into the horizontal system of the building.

The triaxial shaped bulging center of side parts of the building facade are marked by vertical avant-corps and this results in the formation of plastics volume. Architect N.A von der Nonne believed that these elements were not sufficient for a prestigious palace building. For this reason, one-storeyed porticos are placed between the avant-corps that go forward from the façade line. Porticos have three corner columns of ionic order.

The porticos, along with their balconies on the second floor, enlarge the building façade composition. Creation of architectural forms by classic methods has resulted in separation of strong stylobate of the facade surface and the rustication part of the first floor with large stone blocks. On the background of such monumental part, the proportion of lightweight porticos have the influence. The contrast of the volume of the facade elements is the model of new composition systems in city construction.

Facades of the palace

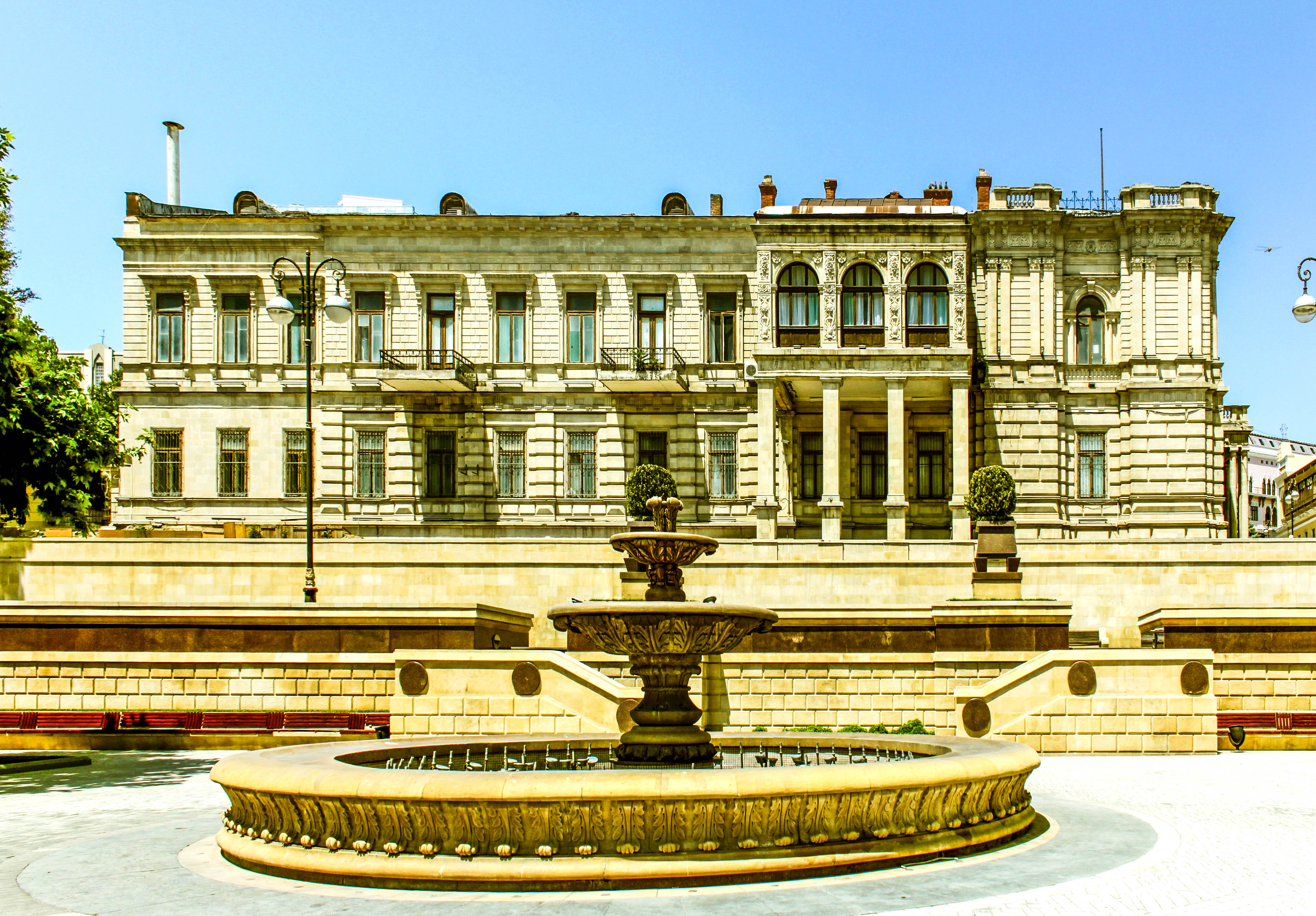
from garden

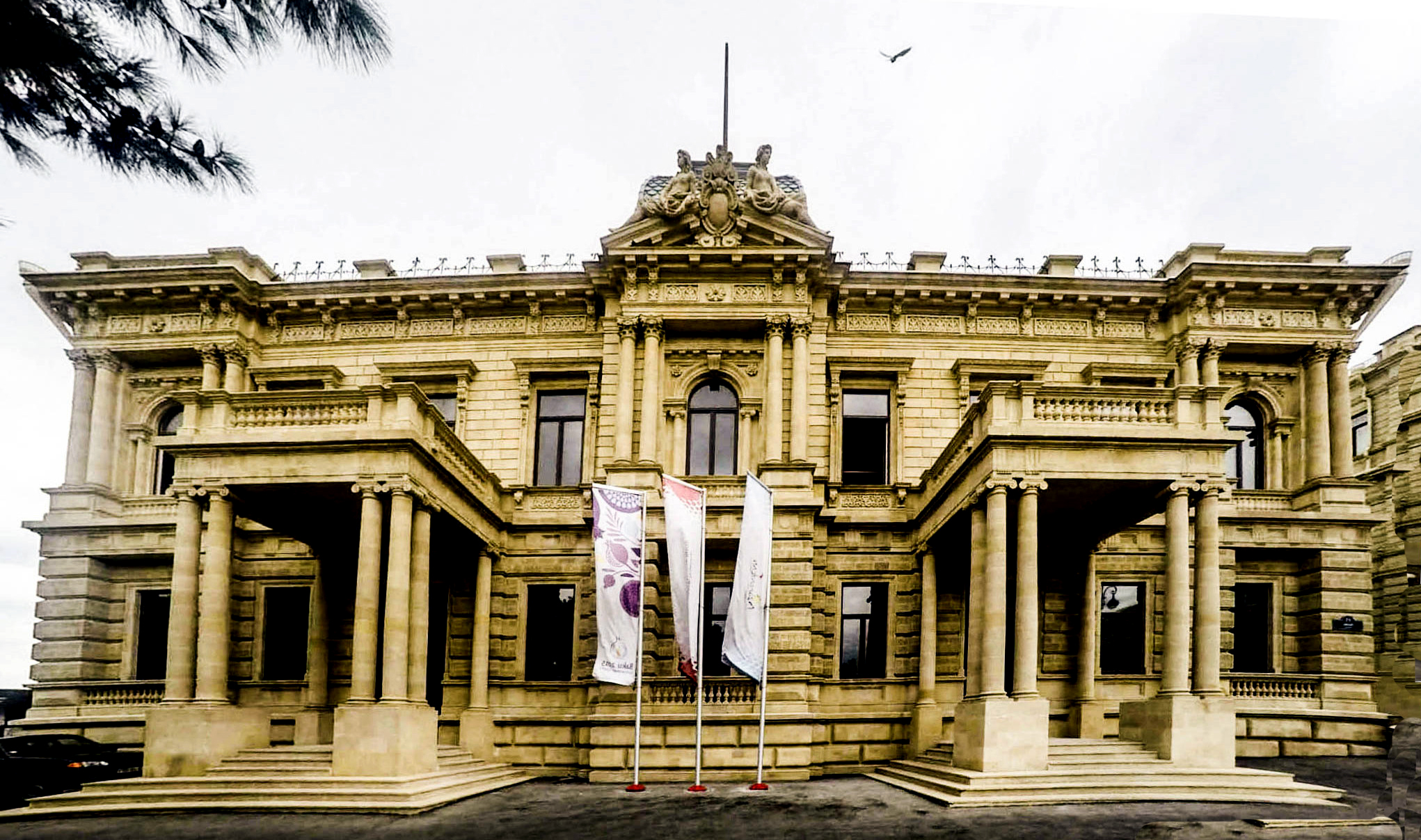
from Niyazi street

Avant-corps of second floor are with noted with Corinthian order and it reminds of porticoes, far beyond the wall. They organize a plastic composition by harmonizing with the porticoes of the first floor. A rising classic object-spatial structure occurs over the building.

The dense horizontal porticoes of the lower floor have a soft transition to the second floor rustication. The facade of the second floor is represented by vividly profiled window places located on rustications and rhythmically arranged, rectangular window frames.

The triangular pediment on central rustication cornice is expressed with heraldic elements and sculpture figures. Architect Nicholas von der Nonne, in his original form, tried to mark the central part with a vivid artistic form, and decorated the form with a decorative dome on it. Vividly profiled cornice with sophisticated architectural detail differs in volume-spatial composition of the building.

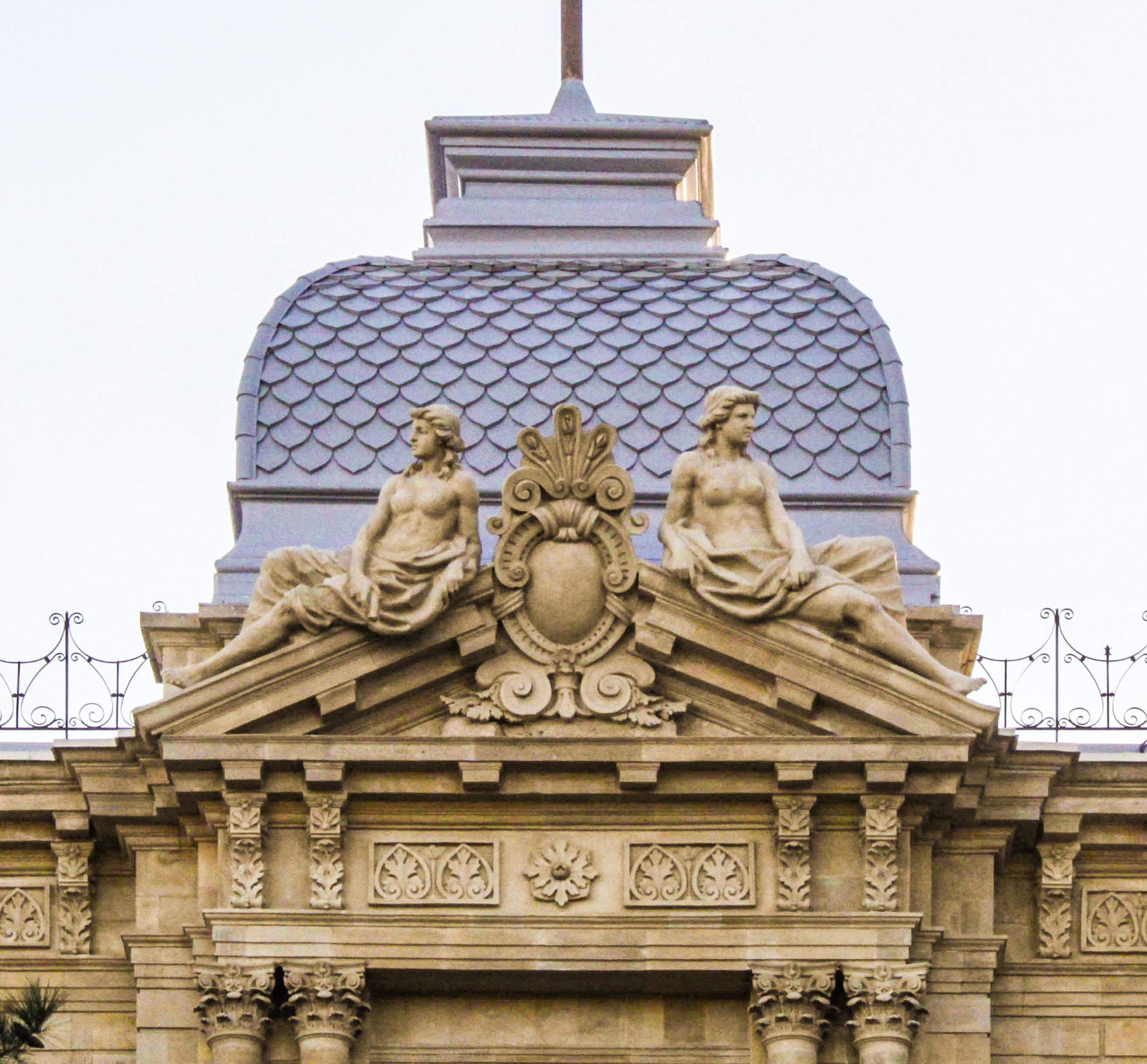
Triangular pediment on central avant-corps, heraldic element, a pair of Muse sculptures and decorative dome

The classic forms of the portico's columns, the corinthian order of the rustications, the thin profiles of the window frames, and the first-floor floor covering on the lightweight stone background create the fullness of the palace's architectural composition.

The building of the Nicholas von der Nonne is his first attempt of the use of volumetric settlement of the mansion through the active use of porticoes, loggias and other plastic means. The building is distinguished by the individuality of the planned and architectural solution: enfilades of rooms which has windows looking at main facade are completed with halls. All the rooms, including stairs and toilets, are illumined by the first light. At this time, the empty space free from the neighborhood allowed the architect to interpret the building as not to completed as a whole organism.

Facade on the side of Niyazi street and specially mentioned and not deep avant-corps which has three axes are divided into two floors with stylobates which are profiled through the whole corps. The central axis is striking with small dome as well. The whole composition of the façade is enriched with lightweight loggia-porticoes of the Ionic order, which is particularly noticeable. This method led to the creation of a composition with landscape. The classic forms of the columns of the visible portico, corinthian order of the avant-corps, the profiles of window frames, and construction of the first floor from deep and second floor of lightweight stones creates plastic composition. The palace has unique properties for buildings similar to other building in Baku. In the 1930s, the reconstruction of the land was completed. The volume of the palace was included in the reconstructed garden composition by architect K. İ. Senchikov, which created a whole ensemble.

=== Interior ===
Interior designs decorated with classic motifs, with the participation of Venetian mirrors with semi-circular arches. The walls are divided into decorated panels. Double corinth pilasters decorates the interior. Columns describe the composition of the rooms and are the most active elements of the interior. They do not prevent the screens on the walls, but on the other hand, they create a spatial environment.

Architect N.A von der Nonne created an oriental interior in its own unique style for local architectural traditions in one of the corner rooms of the second floor. After von der Nonne, this tradition were accepted by many Baku architects. In the Azizbeyov's house, the house of Musa Nagiyev, the Rilskiy brothers' house, Palace of Zeynalabdin Taghiyev and other historical buildings in Baku oriental style halls have been preserved.

On the second floor of De Boure's palace, there are two separate lounges oriented to front facade which was designed for ceremonial receptions. Long, straight corridors on the right and left sides of the building plan connect the entire room with an enfilade system. The lounges are large and decorated with columns on the side parts on transverse walls. This was one of the methods the architect N.A von der Nonne preferred. Including three-dimensional round columns that stand apart from the structure of the hall enriches the interior of the decorative plastic. The semi-ringed wall cavity, close to the columns and the floor of the hall, creates soft and cozy atmosphere with large arches. N.A von der Nonne often used such architectural elements in the interior of his residential buildings. The presence of mirrored steam next to the column also indicates the new shape applied on the interior.

== Gallery ==
Different views of the palace

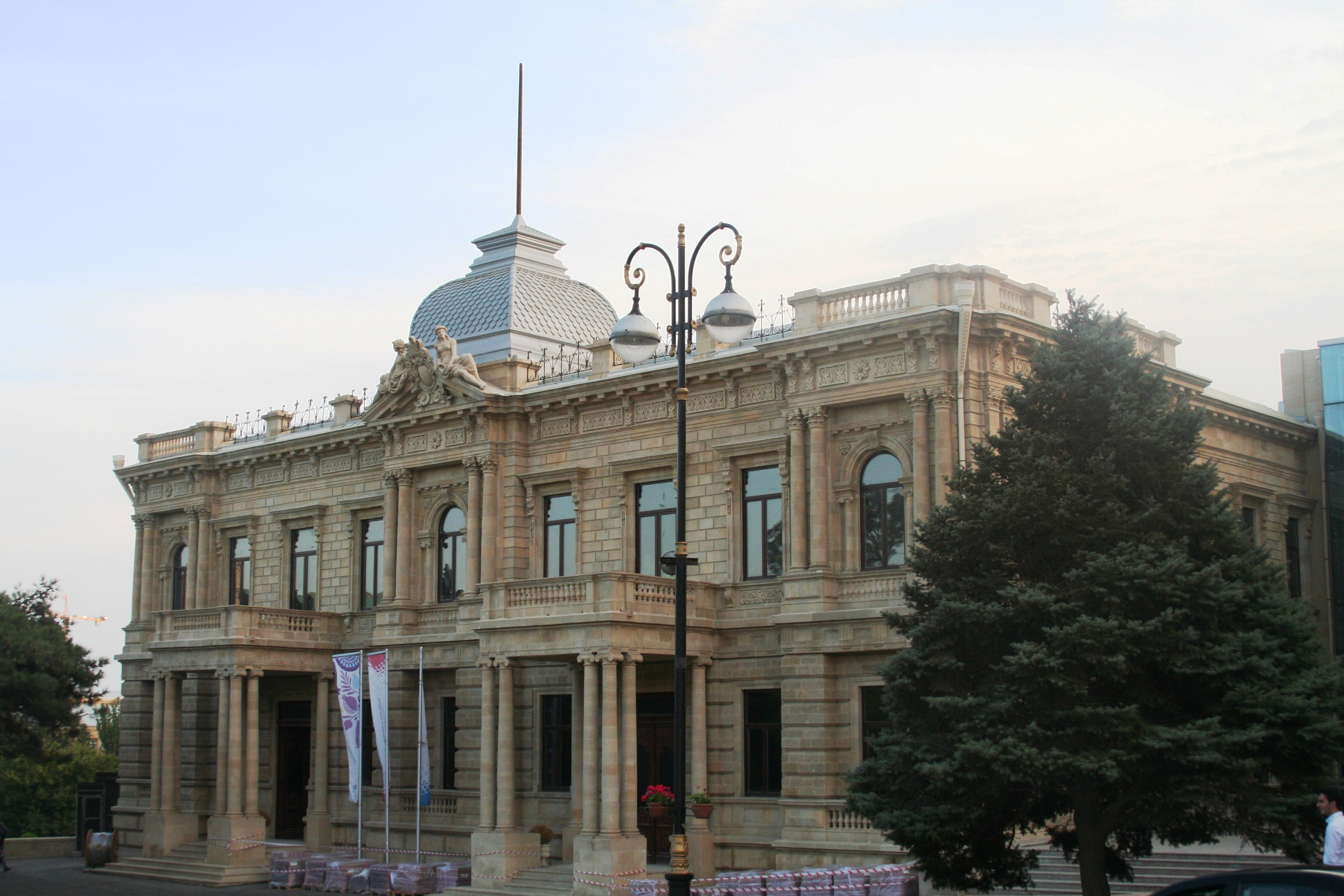

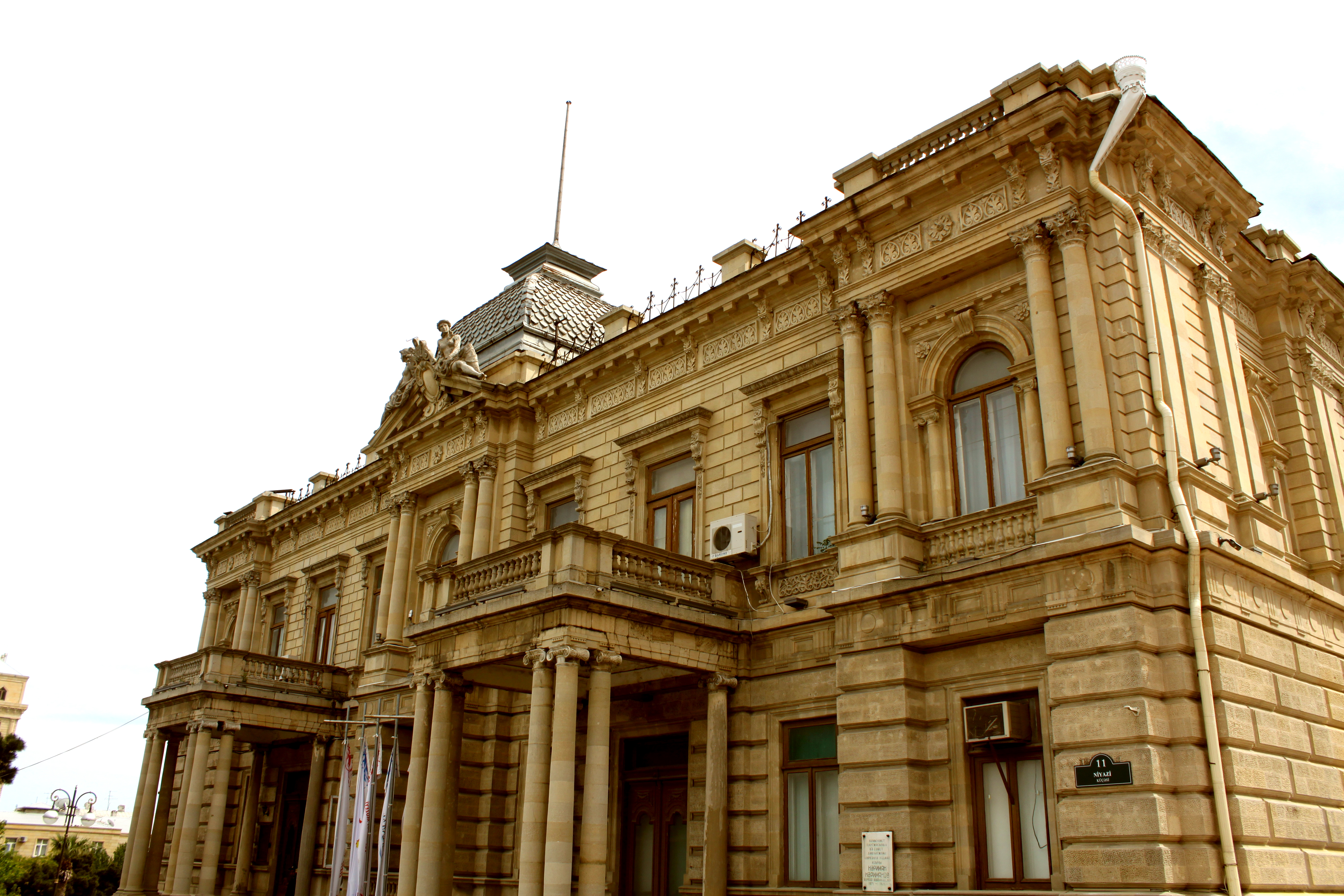

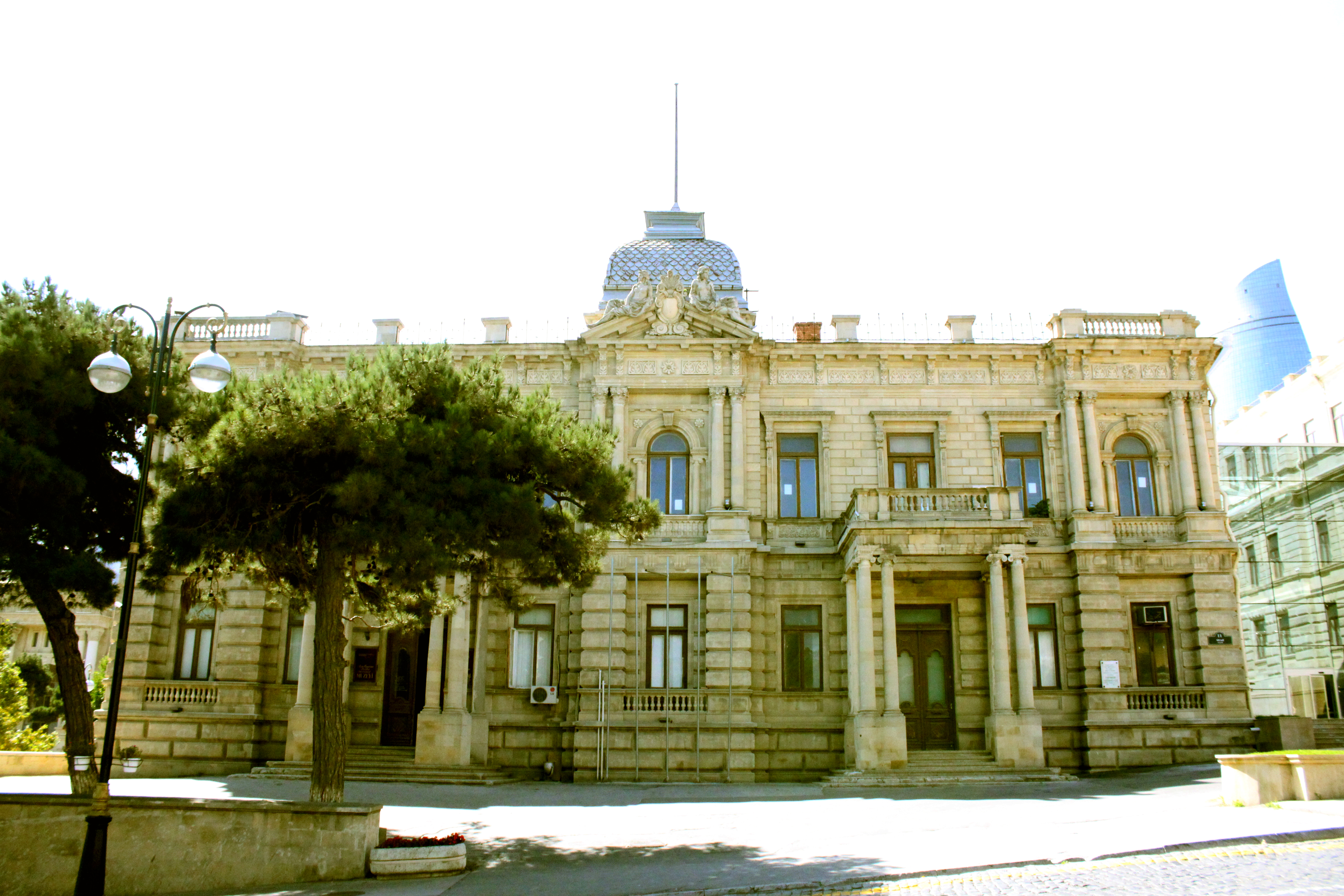

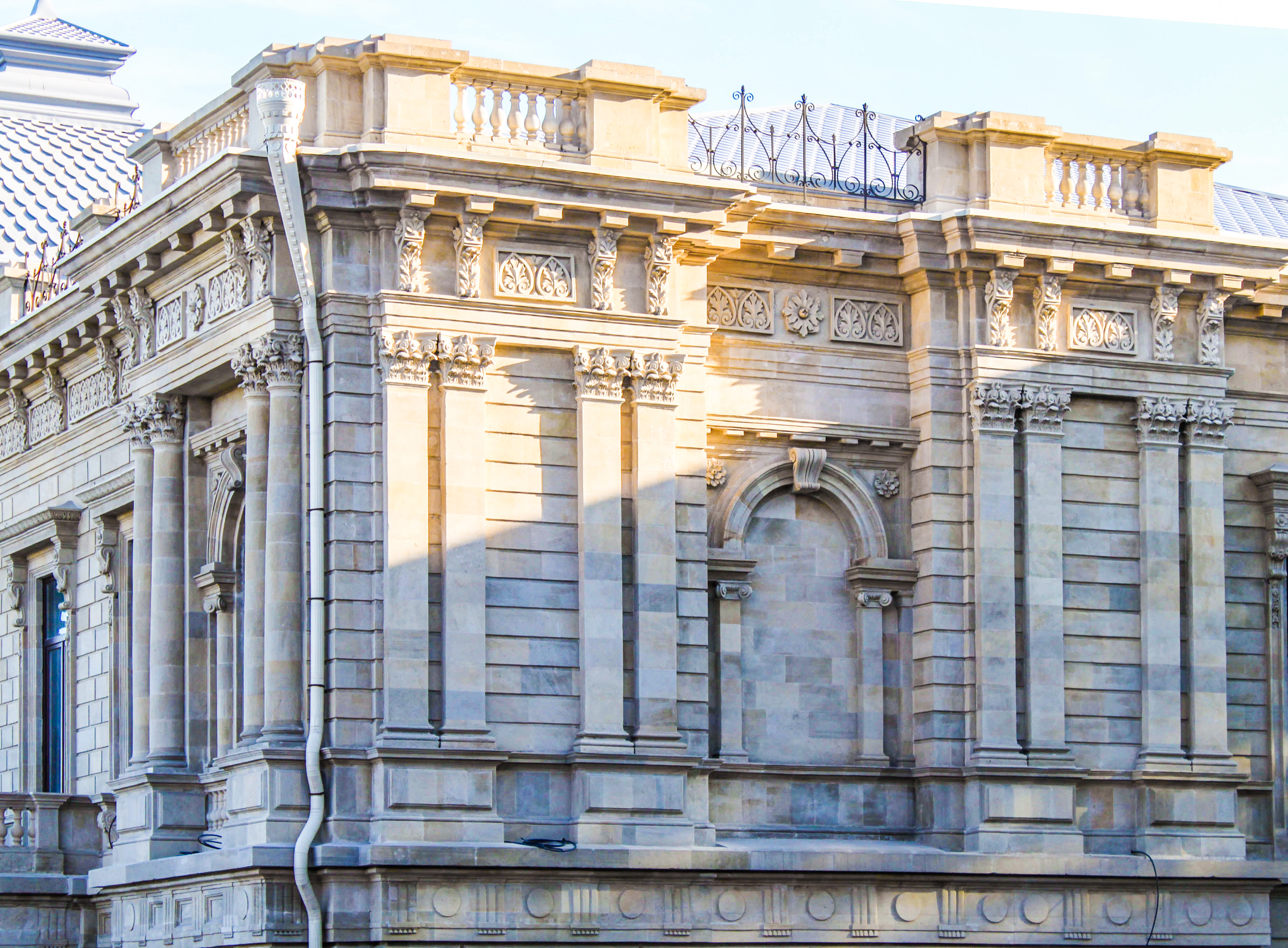

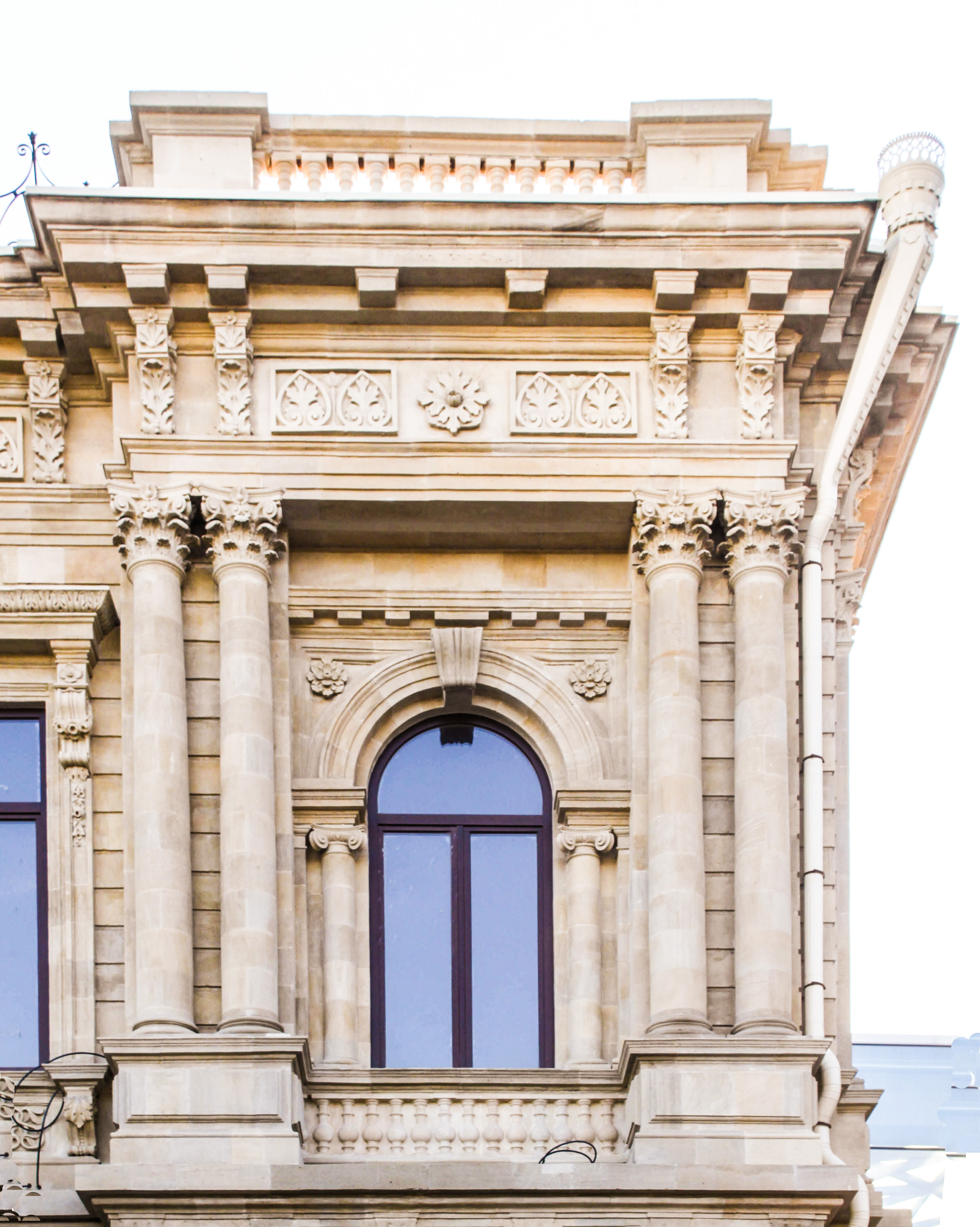

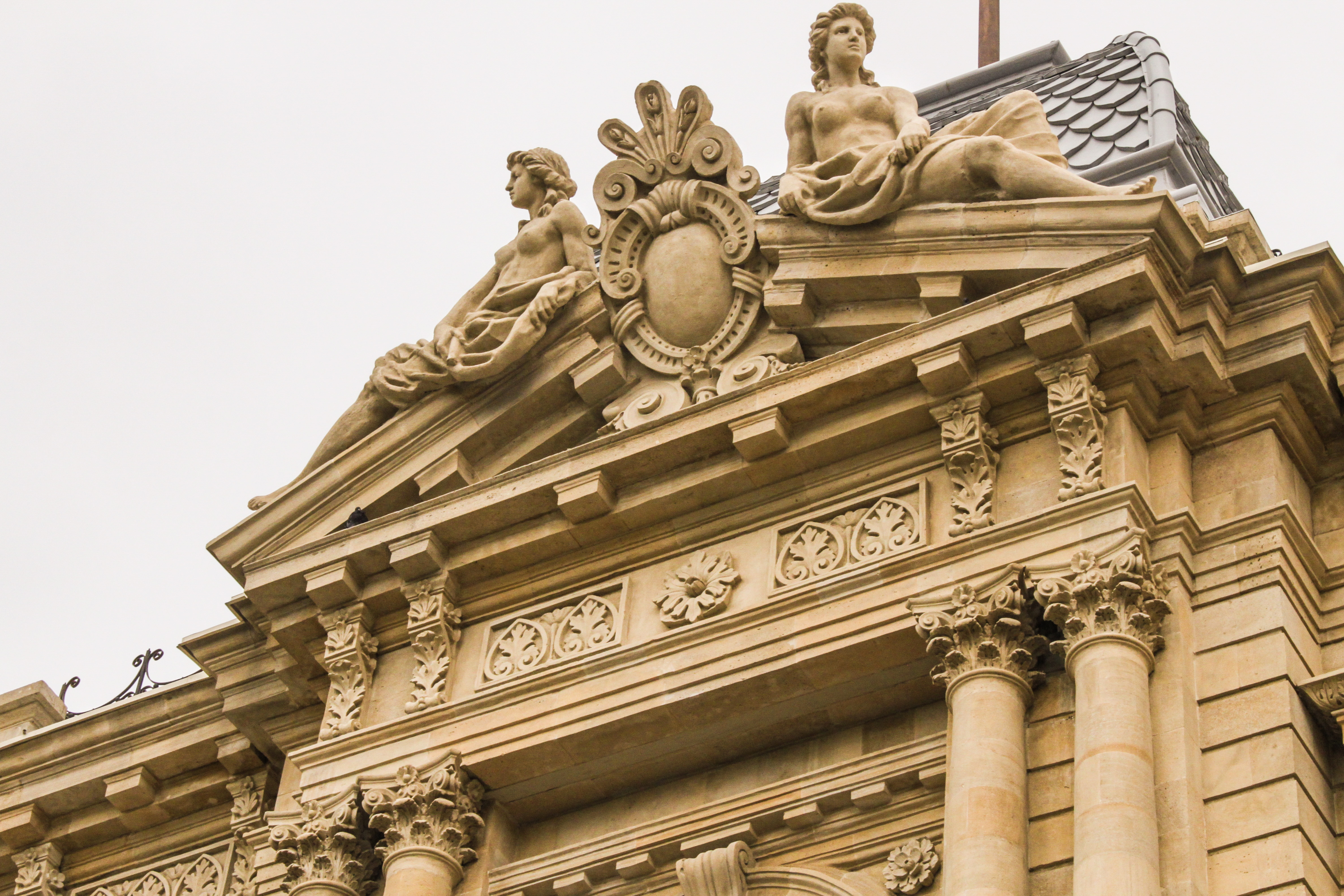

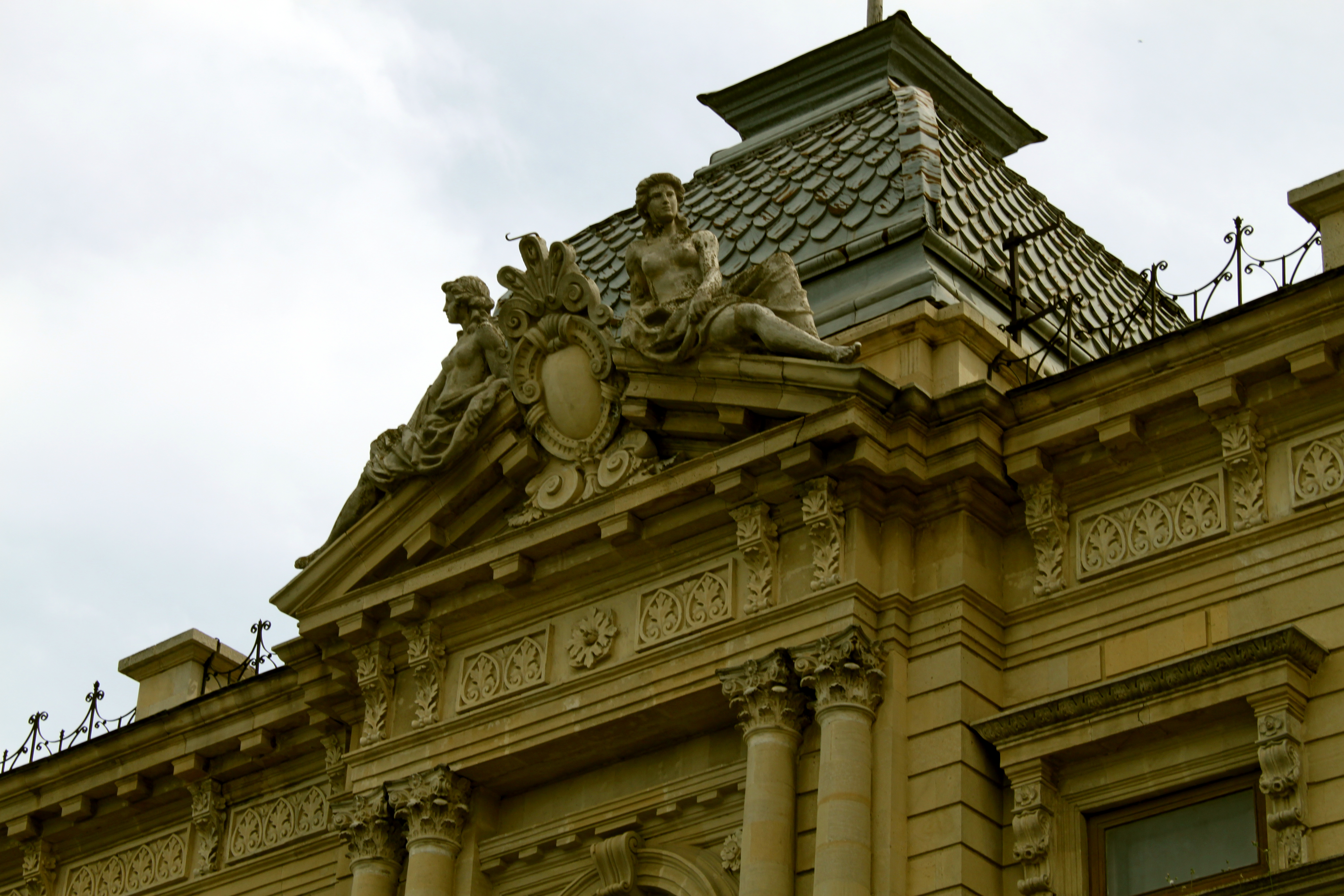

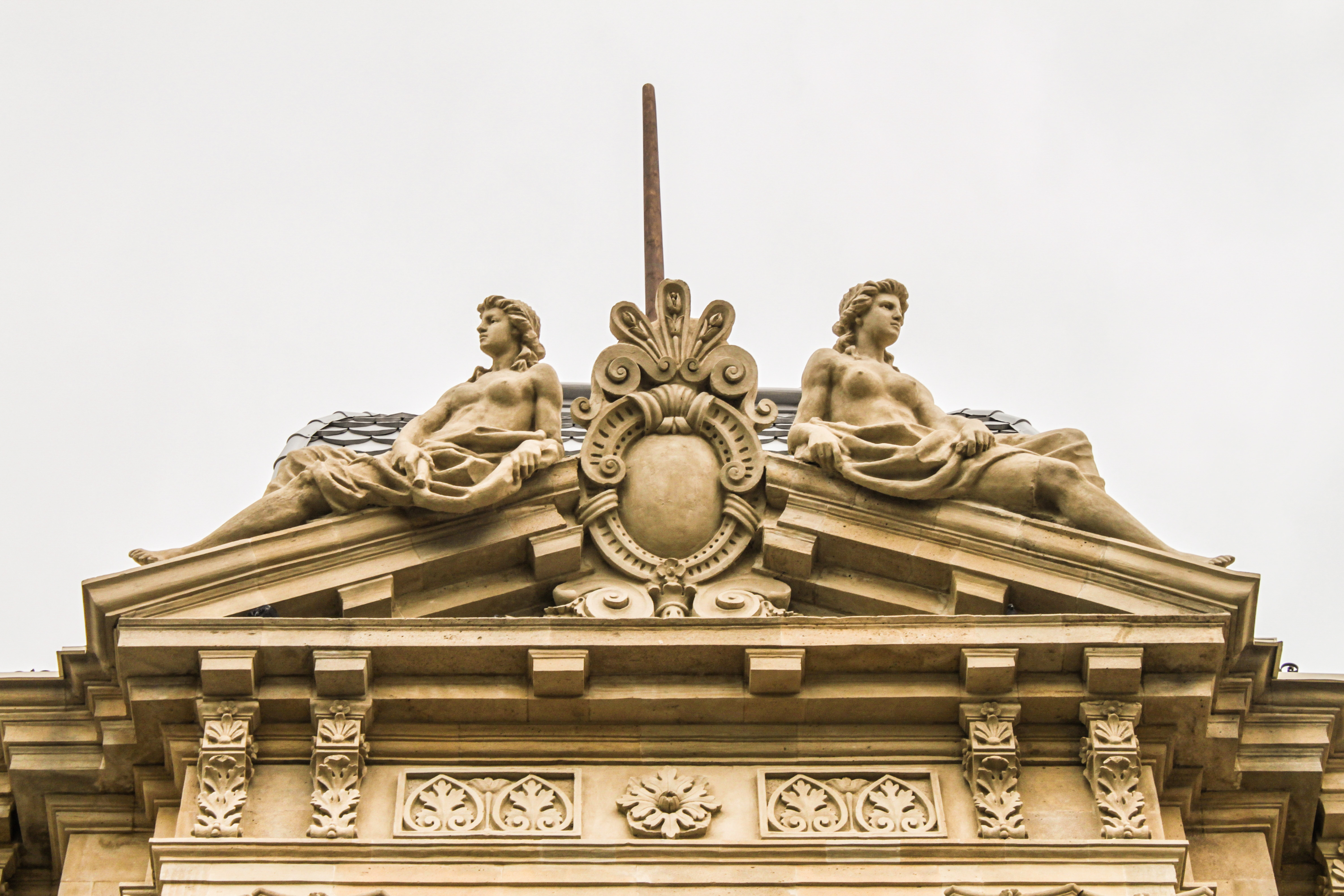

== Sources ==
- Fətullayev-Fiqarov, Şamil (2013a), Mühəndis-polkovnik N.A. Fon Der Nonne [Engineer-Colonel N.A. von der Nonne] (in Azerbaijani), Baku: East-West
- Fətullayev-Fiqarov, Şamil (2013b), Bakının memarlıq ensiklopediyası [Architectural Encyclopedia of Baku] (in Azerbaijani), Baku: East-West
