= Haji Gayib bathhouse =

Haji Gayib’s bathhouse
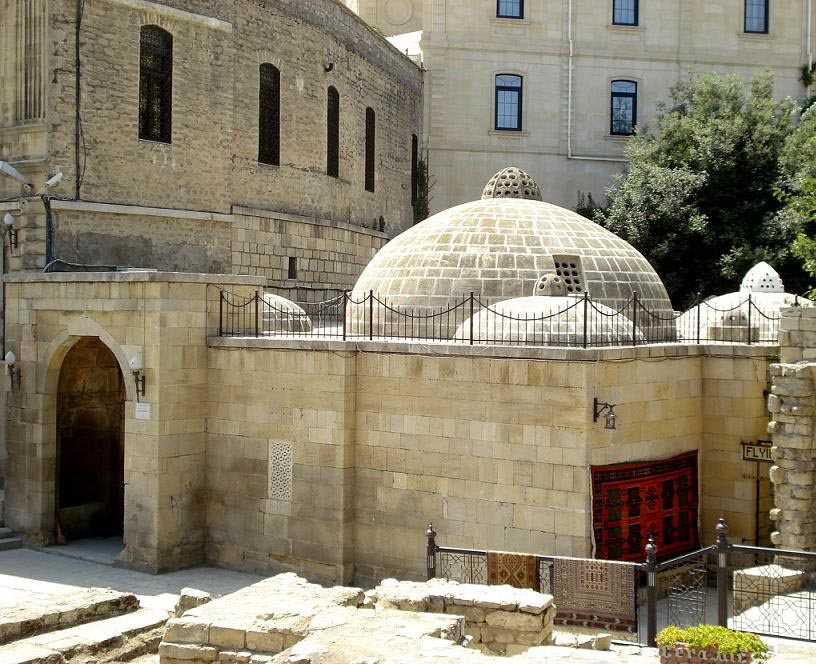

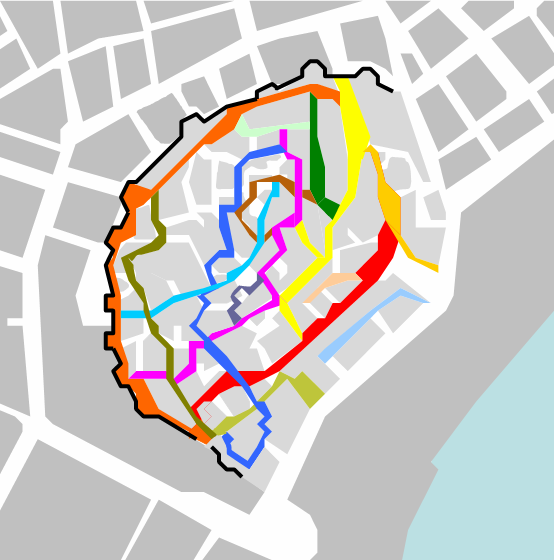
- Location within Streets in Old City, Baku, Azerbaijan

General information
- Location: Baku, Azerbaijan
- Coordinates: 40°21′55″N 49°49′57″E
- Completed: 15th century

Haji Gayib's bathhouse – is an ancient fortress construction near a coastal side of Icheri Sheher.

Haji Gayib's bathhouse is located in the Baku quarter of Icheri Sheher, opposite the Maiden Tower. The history of the bathhouse is dated back to the 15th century.

The intake portal of the bathhouse is rectangular shaped. The whole complex of the bathhouse is divided into 3 groups: dressing room, changing room and a bathing area. The dressing and changing rooms have octagonal halls, surrounded by small rooms. Vaults and domes have various figured outlines and were implemented thoroughly. There is a pool with warm and cold water in the centre of the hall. The floors are covered with stone plates. Heating is promoted by ceramic pipes or channels under the floors of the rooms. Warm air, produced by water heating, circulates along these channels.
