= List of mosques in Azerbaijan =

This is a list of mosques in Azerbaijan.

Name	Images	Location	Year/century	G	Remarks
Agdam Mosque		Aghdam	1868–1870	TS	
Ajdarbey Mosque		Baku	1912–1913	TS	
Ali Mosque		Boradigah (Masally)			
Anykh Mosque		Əniq (Qusar)	1911		
Ashaghi Govhar Agha Mosque		Shusha	1875–1876	TS	
Ali ibn Abi Talib Mosque		Buzovna (Baku)	1896	TS	
Ambaras Mosque		Ordubad, Nakhchivan Autonomous Republic	17th century	TS	Also known as the Sultan Murad Mosque or Mir Jafar Mosque
Ardabil mosque		Quba	1894-1895		
Beyler Mosque		Baku	1895	TS	Also spelled "Beglar Mosque"
Bibi-Heybat Mosque		Baku	1281	TS	
Birinji Nugadi Mosque		Birinci Nügədi (Quba)	19th century		
Boyuk Bazar Mosque		Lankaran	1864	U	
Chobankol Mosque		Çobankol (Zagatala)	19th century		
Garghabazar Mosque		Qarğabazar, Fuzuli	1683-1684	U	
Gasimbey Mosque		Baku	1892-1896		
Gasimli mosque		Qasımlı (Masally)	1756	TS	
Gazakhlar Mosque		Ganja	1880	U	
Gileyli Mosque		Baku	1309	TS	
Gizilhajili Mosque		Ganja	1877	U	
Gulluk Mosque		Güllük (Qakh)	1727		
Gunduzgala Mosque		Gündüzqala (Qusar)	1912		
Haji Badal Mosque		Basqal (Ismayilli)	1854		
Haji Jafar Mosque		Quba	1905		
Haji Rufai Bey Mosque		Nakhichevan	18th century	TS	
Haji Shahla Mosque		Balaxanı	14th century		
Haji Sultanali Mosque		Baku	1904-1910		
Heydar Mosque		Baku	2014	U	
Hil mosque		Hil (Qusar)	1912		
Huseyniyyah Mosque		Ganja	1825		
Imam Hussein Mosque		Baku	1896	TS	
Imamzadeh mosque		Ganja	1878	U	
Juma Mosque		Baku	1899	TS	
Juma Mosque		Balaxanı (Baku)	1873		
Juma Mosque		Balakan	1867-1877	S	
Juma mosque		Barda	1905	U	
Juma Mosque		Boradigah (Masally)	1853-1854	TS	
Juma Mosque		Salyan	1865		
Juma Mosque		Shaki	1900-1914	S	
Juma Mosque		Ordubad	1604	TS	
Juma Mosque		Qabala	1898-1906	S	
Juma Mosque		Quba	1792-1802	S	
Juma Mosque		Shamakhi	743	S	
Kichik Bazar Mosque		Lankaran	1906	U	
Khanagah Mosque		Xanəgah (Quba)	19th century		
Khidir Mosque		Baku	1301	U	
Lezgi Mosque		Baku	1169	S	
Mashadi Garib Mosque		Buzovna (Baku)	1876	U	
Molla Ahmad Mosque		Baku	1300	TS	
Mosque of the Martyrs		Baku	Beginning of the 1990s	S	
Muhammad Mosque		Baku	1078–1079	TS	also known as Sınıqqala Mosque
Murtuza Mukhtarov Mosque		Baku	1901-1908	TS	
Mustafa Qazdal Mosque		Qusar	1998	S	
Nardaran mosque		Nardaran	1663	TS	
New Shusha Mosque		Shusha	2021–2026 (est..)	U	
Omar Efendi Mosque		Shaki	19th century	S	
Ozan Mosque		Ganja	1884		
Palace Mosque		Baku	1441–1442	TS	
Rustov mosque		Rustov (Quba)	1903	S	
Sakinakhanim mosque		Quba	1854	TS	
Saatli Mosque		Shusha	1883	U	
Sayyid Yahya Murtuza Mosque		Baku	17th century	U	
Shah Abbas Mosque		Ganja	1606	TS	
Shahsevanlar mosque		Ganja	1882	U	
Shah Sultan Hussein Mosque		Novxanı	18th century	U	
Sheikh İbrahim Mosque		Baku	1416	TS	
Susay Mosque		Susay (Quba)	1854	S	
Taza Pir Mosque		Baku	1914	TS	
Tuba Shahi Mosque		Mərdəkan (Baku)	1481–1482	TS	
Ulu mosque		İlisu, Qakh Rayon	18th century	S	
Yukhari Govhar Agha Mosque		Shusha	1768–1885	TS	The mosque also bears the name Boyuk Juma Mosque of Govhar Agha

Group
TS:	Twelver Shī‘ah group
S:	Sunni (different madhabs)
U:	Unknown group (or undetermineted)

== See also ==
- List of mosques in Asia
- List of mosques in Baku
