= Huseyniyyah Mosque =

Mosque in Ganja, Azerbaijan

- Azerbaijani: Hüseyniyyə Məscidi
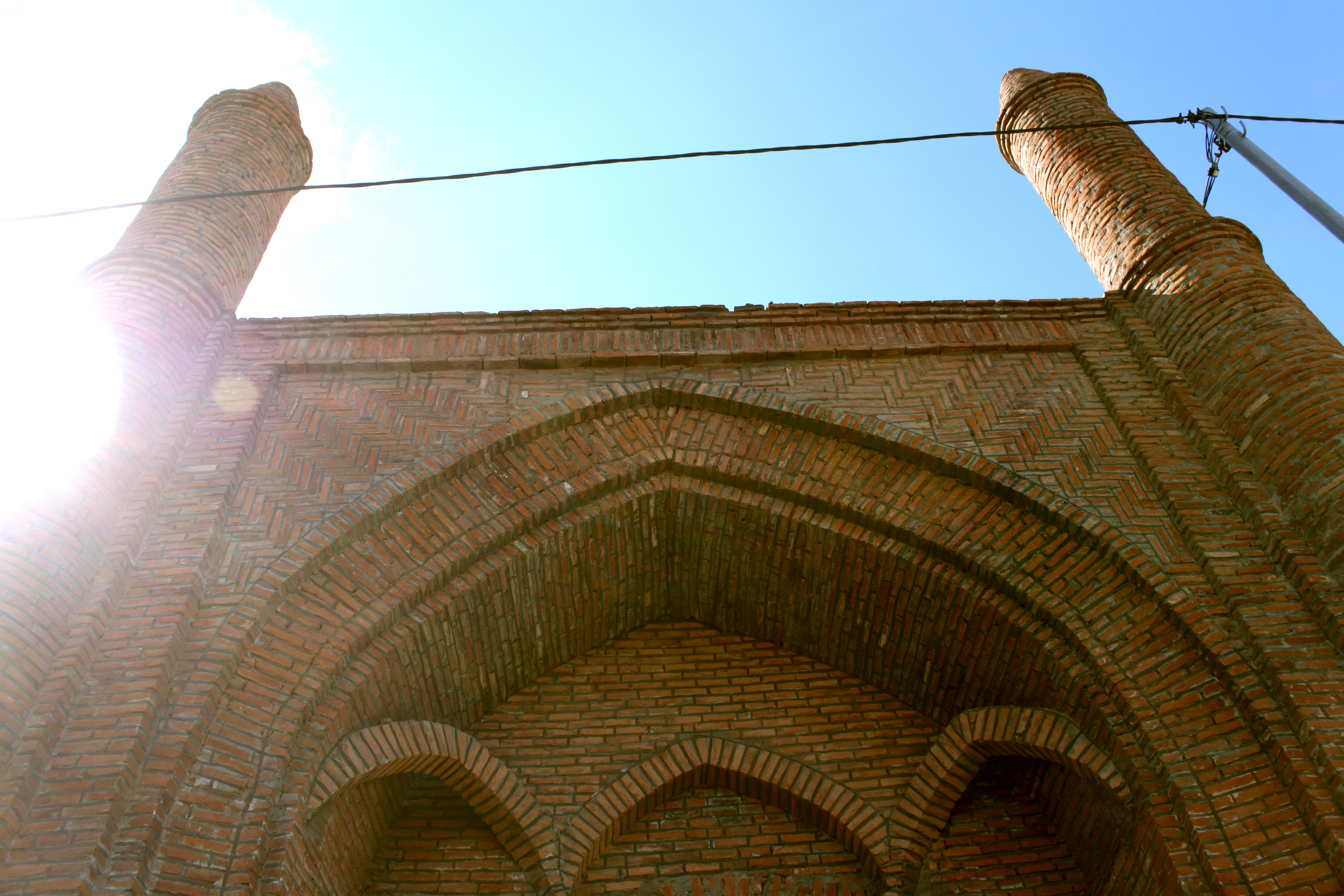
- Entrance to the former mosque, in 2013

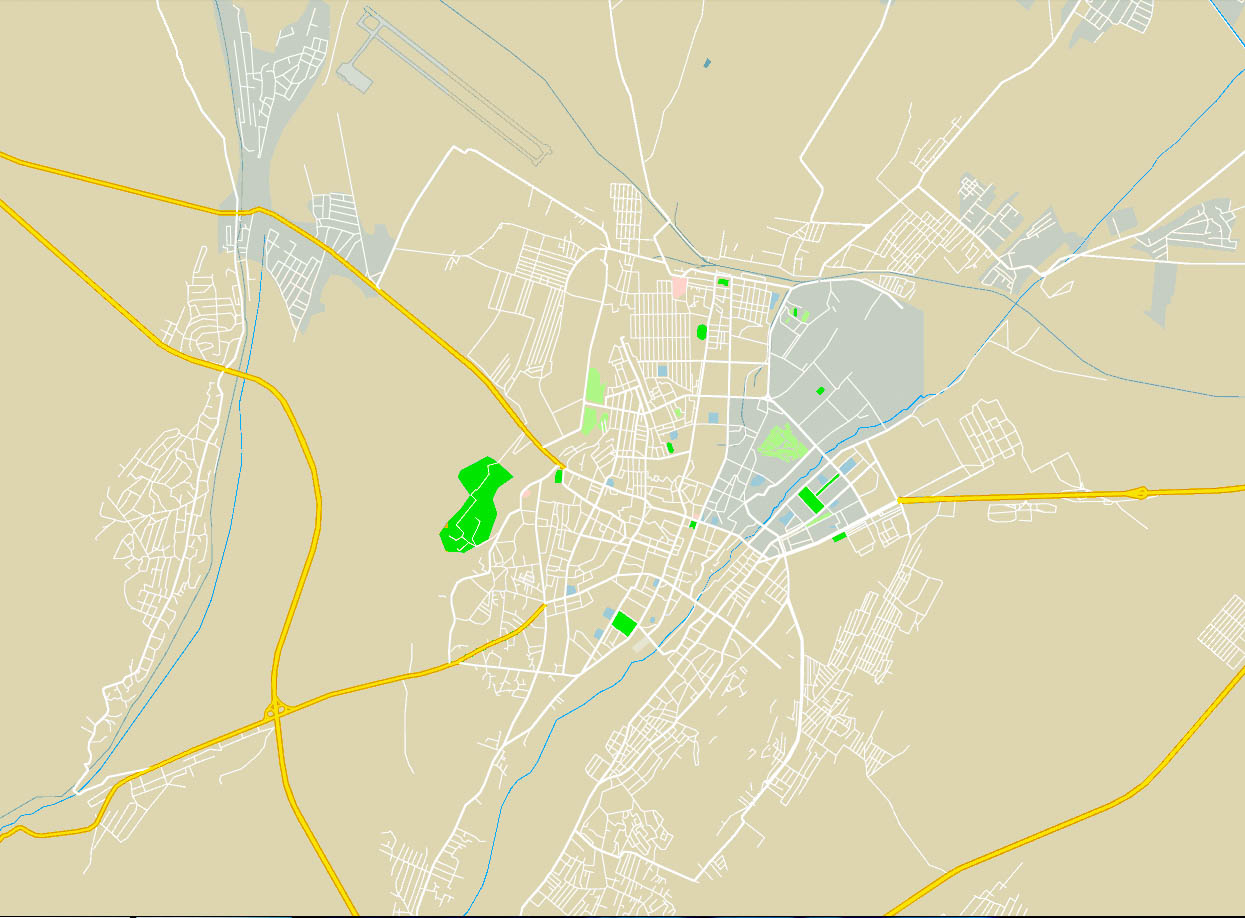
- Location of the former mosque in Ganja

Religion
- Affiliation: Islam (former)
- Ecclesiastical or organizational status: Mosque (1825–1928); Profane use (since 1928)
- Status: Abandoned (as a mosque); Restored and repurposed (as a library)

Location
- Location: Ganja
- Country: Azerbaijan
- Interactive map of Huseyniyyah Mosque
- Coordinates: 40°40′22″N 46°21′27″E

Architecture
- Type: Mosque architecture
- Style: Arran School of Architecture
- Completed: 1825
- Minaret: Two

The Huseyniyyah Mosque (Azerbaijani: Hüseyniyyə Məscidi), also known as the Tat Mosque (Azerbaijani: Tatlar Məscidi), is a former mosque and historical architectural monument, located in the city of Ganja, Azerbaijan. The former mosque was completed in 1825 in the Arran School of Architecture style.

The building has been used as a library since the early part of the 20th century.

== History ==
The Huseynia Mosque is a historical and architectural monument that was built in 1825 at the expense of the daughter of the Iranian prince Bahman Mirza, Sabiyya Khanum. The mosque was also visited by believers, visitors from Iran, and the local population began to call it the Tat mosque. However, according to the existing kitaba, the mosque was originally called "Huseyniya". In the mosque above the mihrab, three kitabs have been preserved. One of them, translated into English, reads:

“The foundation of this mosque was laid on the property and at the expense of Sabiya Khanum, daughter of Prince Barman Mirza. Other generous owners who live here have also invested in the construction of the building.”

Professor Sadig Shukurov, in his book Historical Monuments of Ganja, wrote:

“The presence of decorations in the mosque and the size of the windows give the right to assert that the monument was originally built not as a mosque, but as a madrasah, because in the Eastern world it was forbidden to decorate religious monuments with ornaments.”

However, this building was used as a mosque for a long time. As evidenced by one of the kitabe. The mehrab was added to the building later.

At the end of the 19th century, the Huseynia Mosque, in connection with the 100th anniversary of the birth of A. S. Pushkin, began to be used as a library. However, this did not last long and the mosque began to function again. In 1920, the activities of the library were restored under the name "Nizami-Pushkin". People's artist Togrul Narimanbekov created an example of paintings of two great poets on the inner wall of the building on the eve of the anniversary of Nizami. The library was named in honour of Nizami Ganjavi, an Azerbaijani poet, and it has approximately 10,000 books.

== See also ==
- Islam in Azerbaijan
- List of mosques in Azerbaijan
- Treaty of al-Hudaybiya
