= Gizilhajili Mosque =

Former mosque in Ganja, Azerbaijan

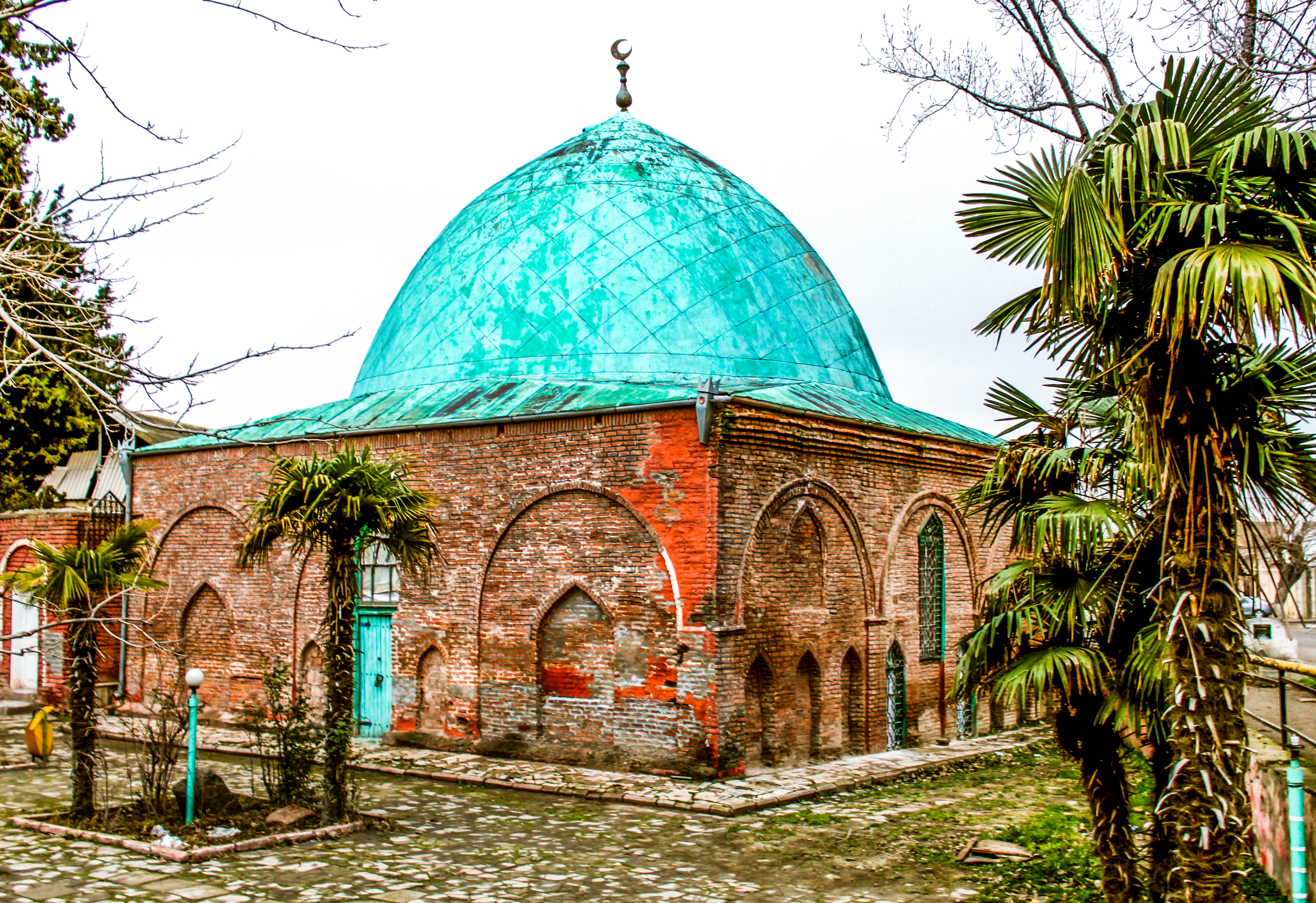
- The former mosque in 2015

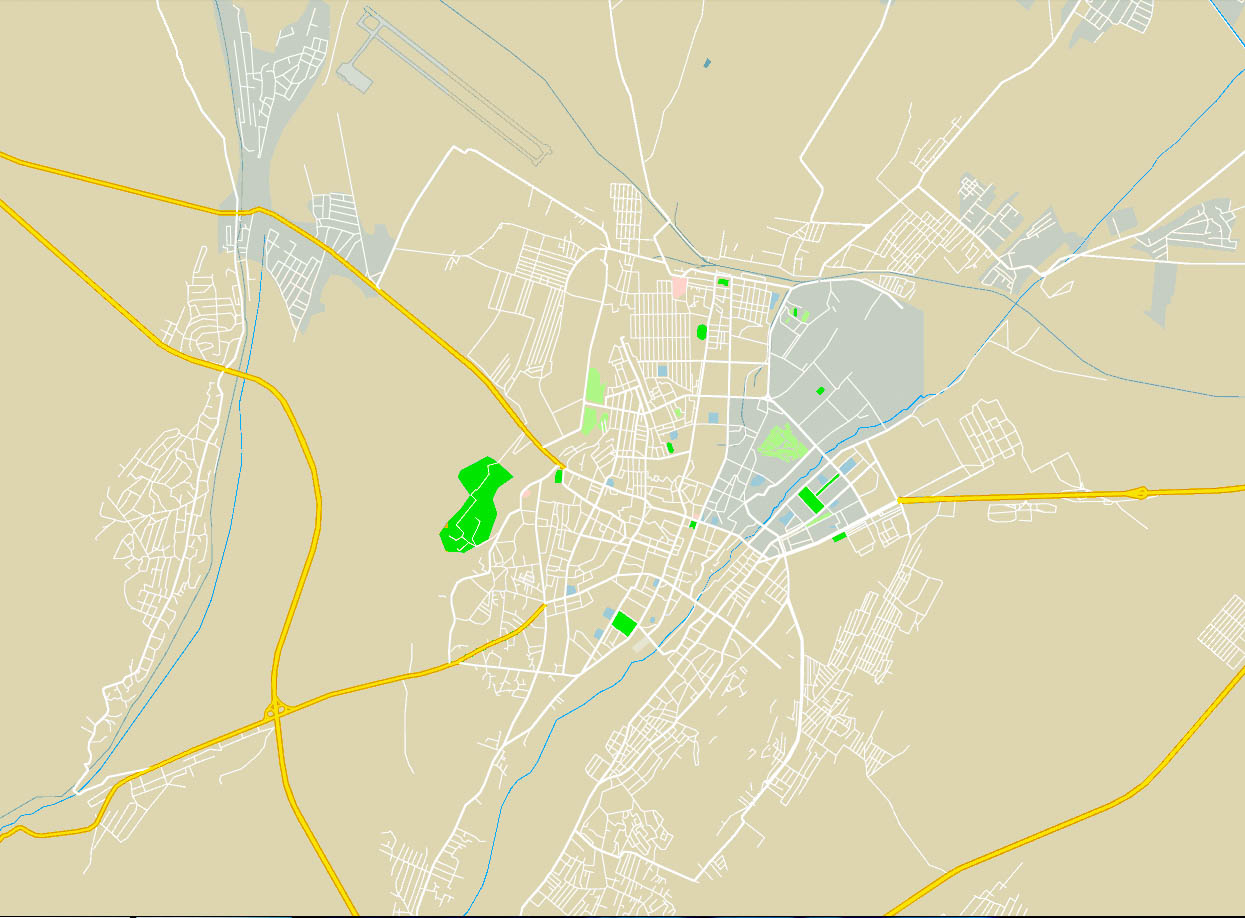
- Location of the former mosque in Ganja

Religion
- Affiliation: Islam (former)
- Ecclesiastical or organisational status: Mosque (1877–1928); Profane use (1928–1991); Library (since ????)
- Status: Abandoned (as a mosque); Repurposed

Location
- Location: Tabriz street, Ganja
- Country: Azerbaijan

Architecture
- Type: Mosque architecture
- Style: Arran School of Architecture
- Completed: 1877

Specifications
- Dome: One
- Materials: Red bricks; gypsum

The Gizilhajili Mosque is a former mosque and historical architectural monument, located in the city of Ganja, Azerbaijan.

Built in 1877, the former mosque was included in the list of immovable historical and cultural monuments of local significance by Decision No. 132 of the Cabinet of Ministers of the Republic of Azerbaijan on August 2, 2001.

== History ==
The Gizilhajili Mosque was built in 1877 in the Gizilhajili neighborhood of Ganja with the financial support of local residents. The mosque is also referred to by the city's residents as "Shabanlı Mosque." It is believed that this name is related to a tribe or the name of a tribal leader from the neighborhood. Additionally, it is possible that the name is associated with the person who either built the mosque or initiated its construction.

After the Soviet occupation of Azerbaijan, an official campaign against religion began in 1928. In December of that year, the Central Committee of the Communist Party of Azerbaijan transferred many mosques, churches, and synagogues to the balance of clubs for educational purposes. While there were 3,000 mosques in Azerbaijan in 1917, this number decreased to 1,700 in 1927, 1,369 in 1928, and only 17 by 1933. Qızılhacılı Mosque also ceased its operations during this period. Over time, the building housed an atheism club and a warehouse.

After Azerbaijan regained its independence, the mosque was included in the list of immovable historical and cultural monuments of local significance by Decision No. 132 of the Cabinet of Ministers of the Republic of Azerbaijan on August 2, 2001.

For some time, a pediatric dental clinic operated in the building. Currently, the building houses a branch of the Ganja City Library No. 22.

== Architecture ==
The mosque is constructed from the red brick traditional to Ganja. The building features a dome, with the iron covering the dome formed in a triangular shape, topped with a jug and crescent. On the wall beside the door, there is a two-arched niche with a window above it that mirrors the niche's shape. From the door, one enters a small corridor, which leads to a square-shaped prayer hall. The interior of the mosque is plastered with gypsum. There are no inscriptions inside, and the mosque lacks a mihrab. It is presumed that the mihrab was destroyed during the period when the building was used as an atheism club.

== See also ==
- Islam in Azerbaijan
- List of mosques in Azerbaijan
