= Gazakhlar Mosque =

Mosque in Ganja, Azerbaijan

- Azerbaijani: Qazaxlar Məscidi
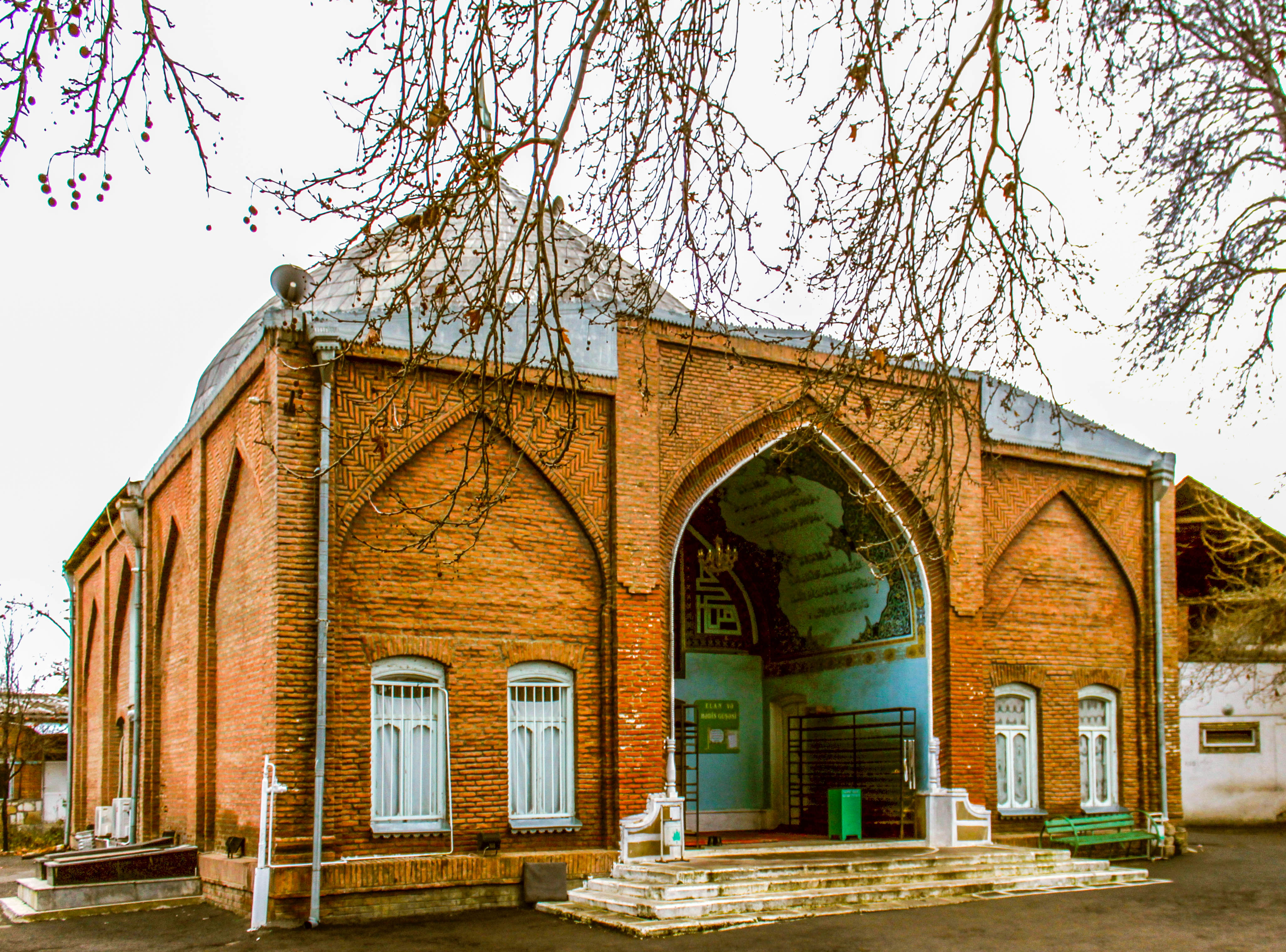
- The mosque, in 2015

- Location of the mosque in Azerbaijan

Religion
- Affiliation: Islam
- Ecclesiastical or organizational status: Mosque (1802–1928); Profane use (1928–1991); Mosque (since 1991)
- Year consecrated: 1801
- Status: Active

Location
- Location: Ganja
- Country: Azerbaijan
- Interactive map of Gazakhlar Mosque
- Coordinates: 40°40′12″N 46°20′05″E

Architecture
- Type: Mosque architecture
- Style: Arran School of Architecture
- Completed: 1802
- Materials: Red brick

The Gazakhlar Mosque (Azerbaijani: Qazaxlar Məscidi) is a mosque, located in the city of Ganja, Azerbaijan. Completed in 1802, the mosque is an historical and architectural monument.

== History ==
The mosque was built in 1801–1802 by the tribes that arrived in Ganja from the Gazakh region. The Gazakhlar Mosque was built based on the plan of the Juma Mosque. It is not known who exactly is the architect of the mosque.

After the establishment of Soviet power in Azerbaijan in 1920, the struggle of the Bolsheviks against religion began. Like many other religious institutions, the Gazakhlar Mosque ceased to function and was used as a warehouse, school and for other purposes.

According to the decision No. 132 of the Cabinet of Ministers of the Republic of Azerbaijan adopted on August 2, 2001, the Gazakhlar mosque was included in the List of Immovable Monuments of History and Culture of Local Importance.

In 2014, a fire broke out in the mosque, as a result of which part of the roof burned down. In 2018, restoration work was carried out at the mosque. Currently, this historical and architectural monument is used as a mosque.

== Architecture ==
The foundation of the mosque is built of river stone. The walls of the mosque are built of red burnt bricks. The thickness of all walls is 12 to 20 cm (4.7 to 7.9 in), and the height is 1.5 m (4 ft 11 in). The facing of the mosque is covered with red brick, typical for this area. Like the Juma Mosque, the Gazakhlar Mosque also has three entrance doors. The main entrance is laid through a deep arched portal. Other doors are to the right and left of the mosque. The mosque has thirteen wooden windows and one staircase. There are no kitaba and various ornaments on the walls of the mosque.

== Gallery ==
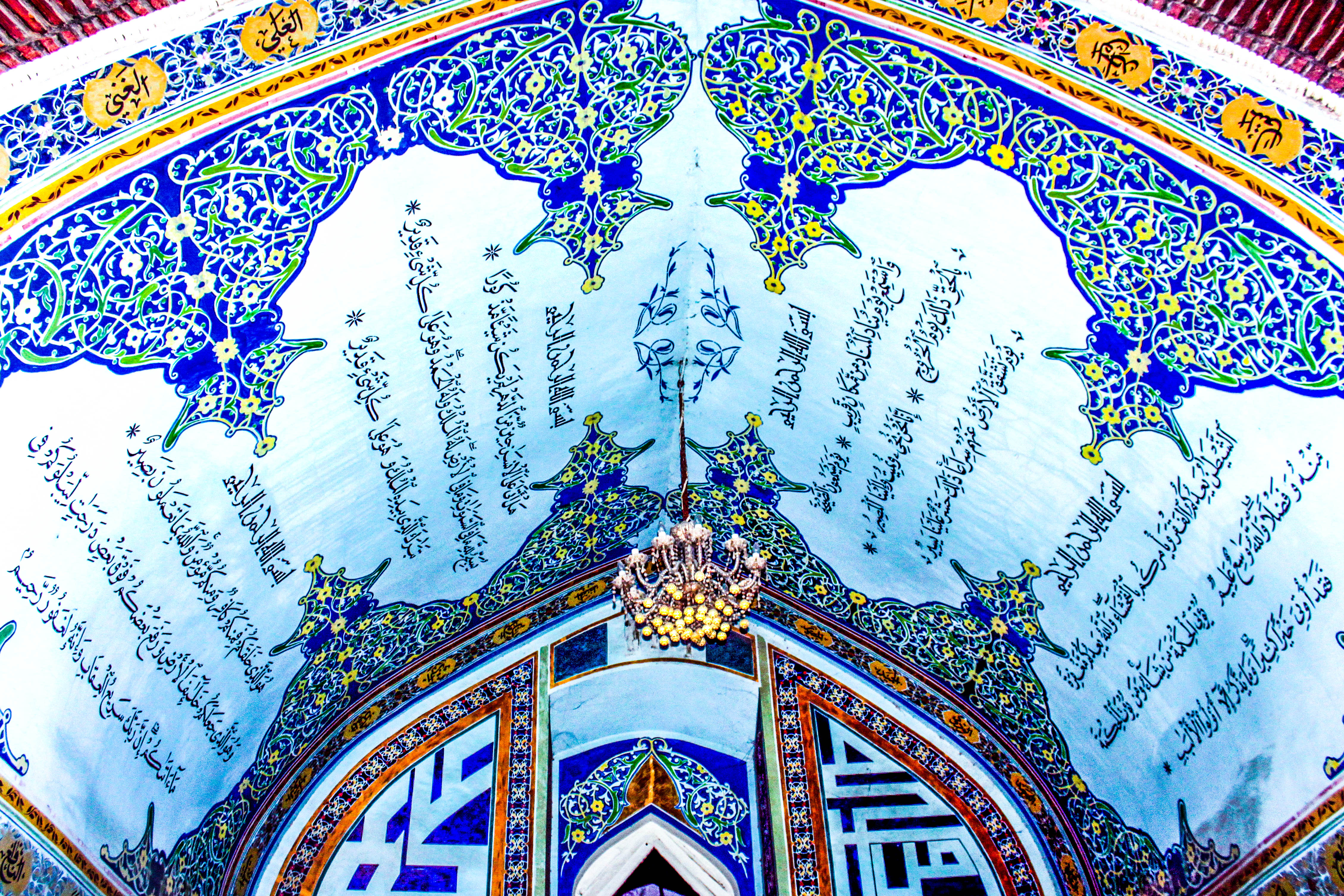
The portal view from the main entrance

== See also ==
- Islam in Azerbaijan
- List of mosques in Azerbaijan
