= Kerbelayi Abdulla Mosque =

Mosque in Baku, Azerbaijan

- Azerbaijani: Kərbəlayi Abdulla məscidi
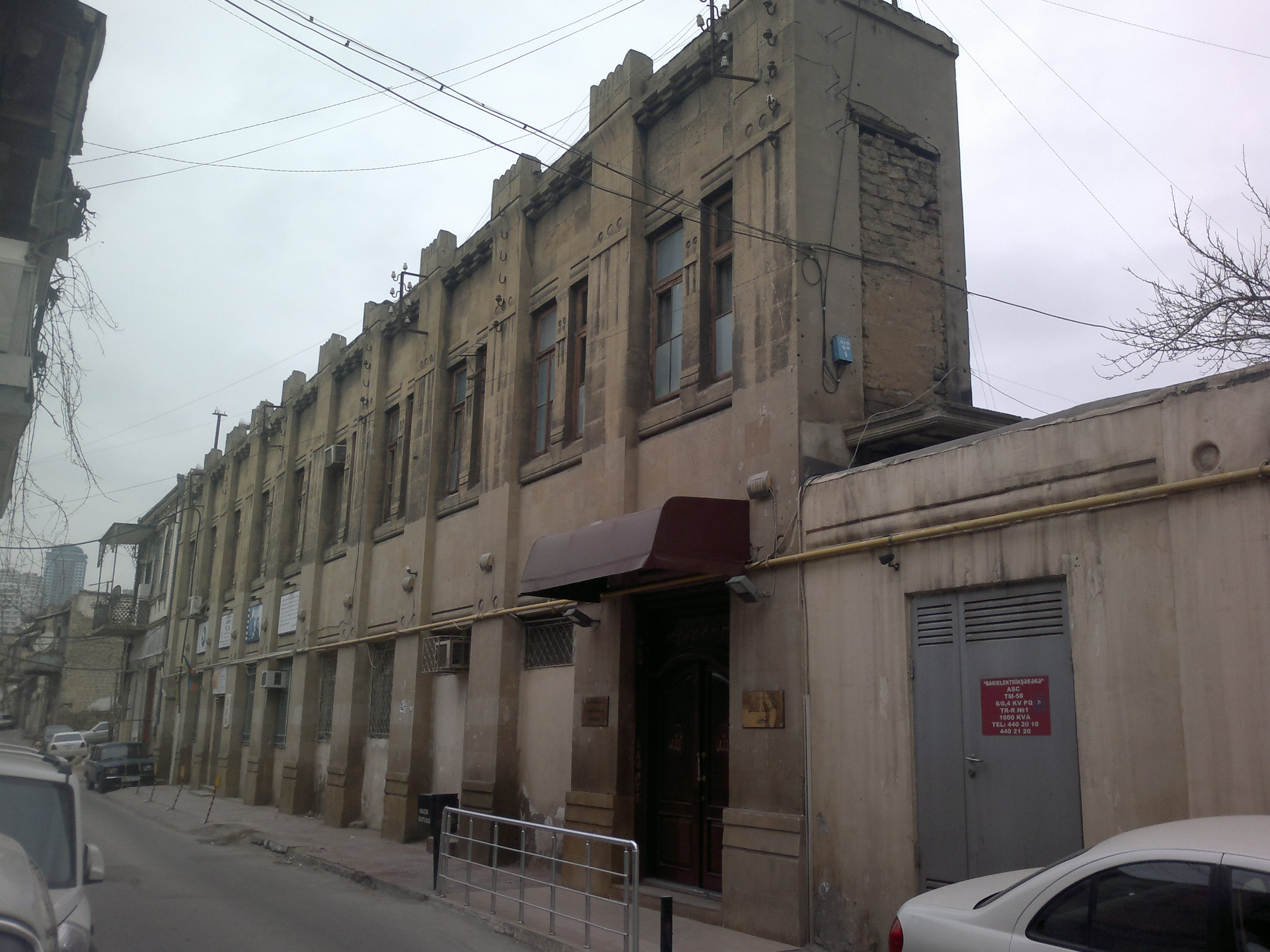
- The former mosque in 2018

- Location of the former mosque in Baku

Religion
- Affiliation: Islam (former)
- Ecclesiastical or organisational status: Mosque (1894–1928); Profane use (1928–1991); Cultural heritage site (since 2001)
- Status: Abandoned (as a mosque); Partially restored

Location
- Location: 155 Dilara Aliyeva Street, Baku
- Country: Azerbaijan
- Coordinates: 40.3753°N 49.8366°E

Architecture
- Type: Mosque architecture
- Funded by: Abdulla Zarbaliyev
- Completed: 1894

Specifications
- Interior area: 170 m^{2} (1,800 sq ft)
- Minaret: Two (since dismantled)
- Materials: Stone

The Kerbelayi Abdulla Mosque is a former mosque and historical architectural monument, located at 155 Dilara Aliyeva Street in Baku, the capital city of Azerbaijan. Built in 1894 by philanthropist Abdulla Zerbaliyev, the mosque was included in the list of local significant immovable historical and cultural monuments by the decision No. 132 of the Cabinet of Azerbaijan on August 2, 2001.

== About ==
According to the stone inscription on the Kerbelayi Abdulla mosque, the mosque was built in 1336 AH (1917/1918 CE). However, the inscription on the entrance gate indicates the construction date as 1311 AH (1893/1894 CE). The mosque was constructed by philanthropist Abdulla Zerbaliyev, a member of the Baku City Duma.

After the Soviet occupation in Azerbaijan, the official campaign against religion began in 1928. In December of the same year, the Central Committee of the Communist Party of Azerbaijan transferred many mosques, churches, and synagogues to the balance of clubs for educational purposes. If there were 3,000 mosques in Azerbaijan in 1917, by 1927, this number decreased to 1,700, and by 1933, it was only 17. The Kerbelayi Abdulla Mosque was also affected during this period, with one of its minarets being used for hanging nearby wet laundry. Another minaret was dismantled. Although the mosque was initially used as a residential building, it later served as a cardboard factory, warehouse, and painting studio for the Russian Drama Theater.

After Azerbaijan regained its independence, the mosque's activities were restored in 1992 through the initiative of the local population. With the decision numbered 132 issued by the Cabinet of Azerbaijan on August 2, 2001, the mosque was included in the list of locally significant immovable historical and cultural monuments.

The "Kerbelayi Abdulla Mosque" registered with the State Committee for Work with Religious Organizations of Azerbaijan, operates as a religious institution.

== Architecture ==
The mosque, built of salt stones, lacks both a dome and a minaret, with the two minarets dismantled during the period of Soviet occupation. The entrance to the prayer hall and the women's prayer area is separate and covered with curtains. The prayer hall is 170 m^{2} (1,800 sq ft).

== See also ==
- Islam in Azerbaijan
- List of mosques in Azerbaijan
