= Ozan Mosque =

Mosque in Ganja, Azerbaijan

- Azerbaijani: Ozan Məscidi; Arabic: مسجد أوزان (كنجه)
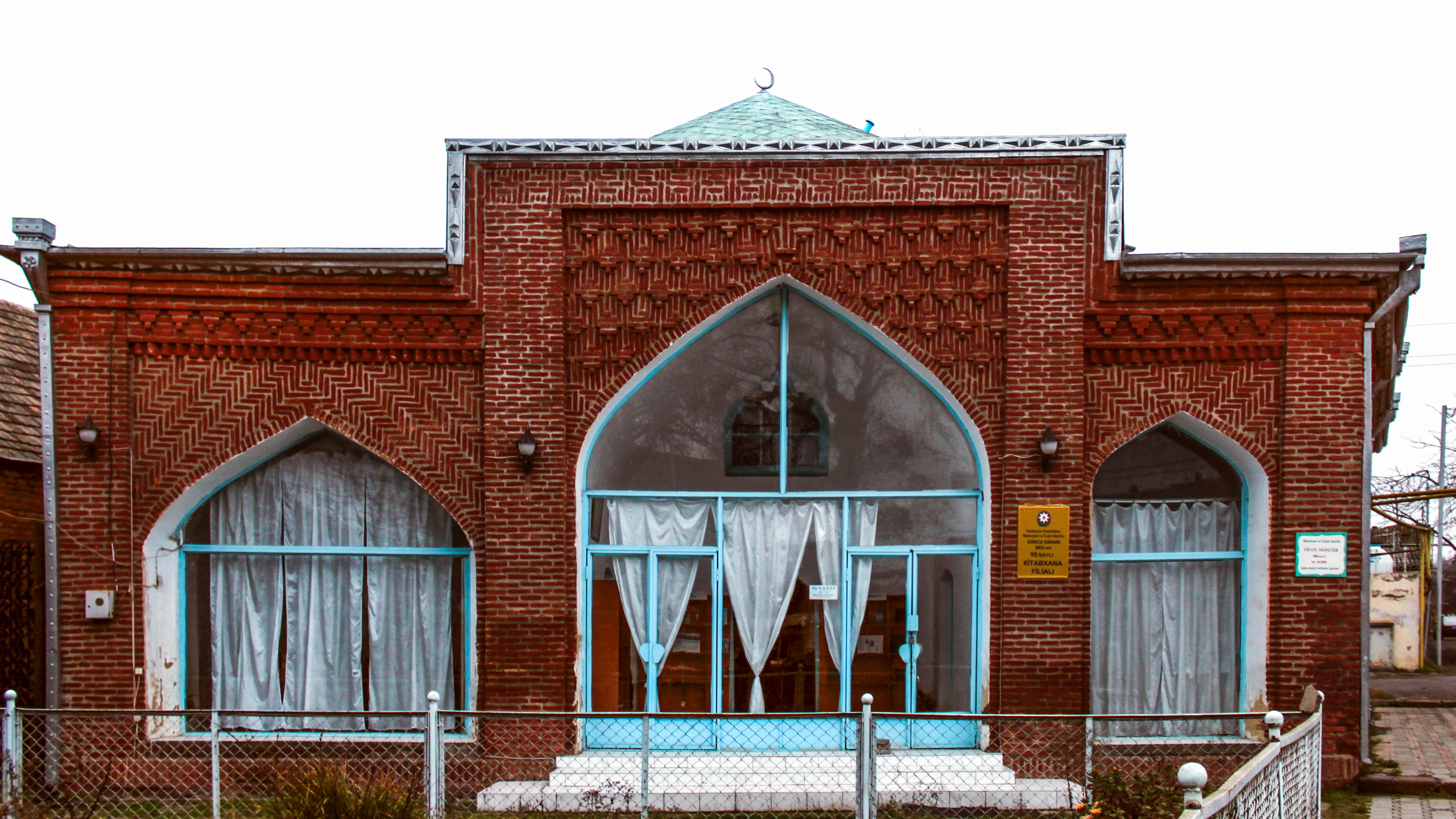
- The mosque in 2015

- Location of the mosque in Azerbaijan

Religion
- Affiliation: Islam
- Ecclesiastical or organisational status: Mosque (1884–1928); Profane use (1928–1979); Mosque (since 1979)
- Status: Active

Location
- Location: Ganja
- Country: Azerbaijan
- Coordinates: 40°58′46″N 47°51′00″E

Architecture
- Type: Mosque architecture
- Completed: 1884

Specifications
- Interior area: 224 m^{2} (2,410 sq ft)
- Dome: One
- Materials: Bricks

The Ozan Mosque (Azerbaijani: Ozan Məscidi; Arabic: مسجد أوزان (كنجه)) is a mosque and historical architectural monument, located in the city of Ganja, Azerbaijan.

Built in 1884, the mosque was included in the list of immovable historical and cultural monuments of local significance by Decision No. 132 of the Cabinet of Ministers of the Republic of Azerbaijan on August 2, 2001.

== Overview ==
The Ozan Mosque was built in 1884 in the city of Ganja at the expense of the residents of the Ozan neighborhood. However, the inscription on the arch above the entrance states the construction date as 1786. The total area of the building is 358 m^{2} (3,850 sq ft), while the usable area is 224 m^{2} (2,410 sq ft). The main part of the mosque is a square-shaped prayer hall covered by a dome. There are two auxiliary rooms on the sides.

In issue 12 of the Molla Nasreddin magazine from 1907, it was reported that 2,000 manats were collected in 1906 for the repair of the mosque with the help of residents of the Ozan neighborhood. In 1920, during the Ganja uprising, part of the mosque was destroyed by cannon fire from the Bolsheviks who besieged the city. Additionally, during the suppression of the uprising, residents who had taken refuge in the mosque were burned alive inside. Mammad Altunbay, a military pilot and émigré originally from Ganja, personally witnessed the events in the mosque. He wrote about them in his book, published in Ankara in 1989. In his book, he notes that:

In the center of the Ozan Mosque, the charred bodies of hundreds of people twisted by the fire created a horrifying scene... The blood and fat of the innocent people burned alive flowed out from under the charred door. Among the corpses, there were faces, hands, feet, and braids that, though not completely burned, had turned black, further amplifying the immense horror of the tragedy. At the other end of the street, five or six Armenians were playing the accordion.

After the Soviet occupation of Azerbaijan, an official campaign against religion began in 1928. In December of that year, the Central Committee of the Communist Party of Azerbaijan transferred many mosques, churches, and synagogues to the balance of clubs for educational purposes. While there were 3,000 mosques in Azerbaijan in 1917, this number decreased to 1,700 in 1927, 1,369 in 1928, and only 17 by 1933. The Ozan Mosque was closed to worship during this period. The building was initially used as a workshop for the blind and later as a grocery store. In 1979, the mosque building was restored. Paintings were created on its interior walls by artist Rustam Huseynquliyev. The building housed a Nizami memorial museum and a bookshop.

After Azerbaijan regained its independence, the mosque was included in the list of immovable historical and cultural monuments of local significance by Decision No. 132 of the Cabinet of Ministers of the Republic of Azerbaijan on August 2, 2001.

Currently, a library operates in the mosque.

== See also ==
- Islam in Azerbaijan
- List of mosques in Azerbaijan
