= New Shusha Mosque =

Mosque under construction in Shusha, Azerbaijan

- Yeni Şuşa məscidi
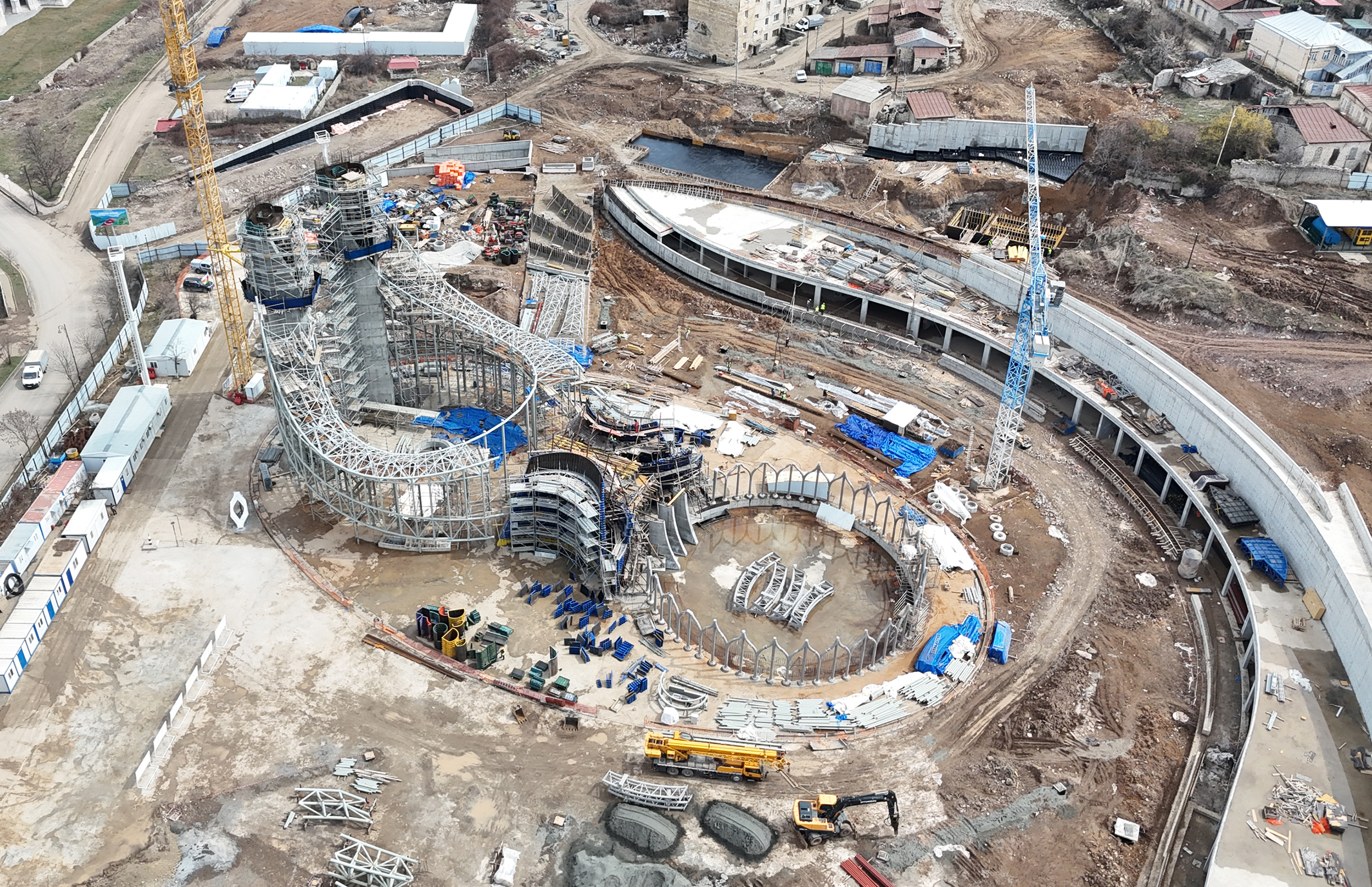
- Aerial view of the construction site, March 2025

Religion
- Affiliation: Islam
- Ecclesiastical or organizational status: Under construction

Location
- Location: Shusha, Azerbaijan

Architecture
- Groundbreaking: 12 May 2021
- Completed: 2026 (planned)

New Shusha Mosque (Azerbaijani: Yeni Şuşa məscidi) is a mosque under construction in the city of Shusha, Azerbaijan.

== History ==
The foundation of the mosque was laid on 12 May 2021.

On 17 July 2025, President Ilham Aliyev and the chairman of the People's Council of Turkmenistan, Gurbanguly Berdimuhamedow, reviewed the progress of construction at the site. On 16 September 2025, President Ilham Aliyev and the president of the United Arab Emirates, Sheikh Mohamed bin Zayed Al Nahyan, visited the site and reviewed the ongoing works.

Completion of the mosque is planned for 2026.

== Architecture and design ==
The mosque is being built in the upper part of Shusha and its design is conceived as symbolic. The overall form is designed to evoke the number 8, associated with Victory Day. The two minarets are designed in the form of the number 11, referencing the month of November.

According to published project details, the minarets are planned to be 72 metres high. The exterior is planned to incorporate geometric ornamentation associated with Shusha's historic mosque minarets, and the dome is planned with mosaic finishing. The design work involved Azerbaijani and Italian architects.

== Gallery ==
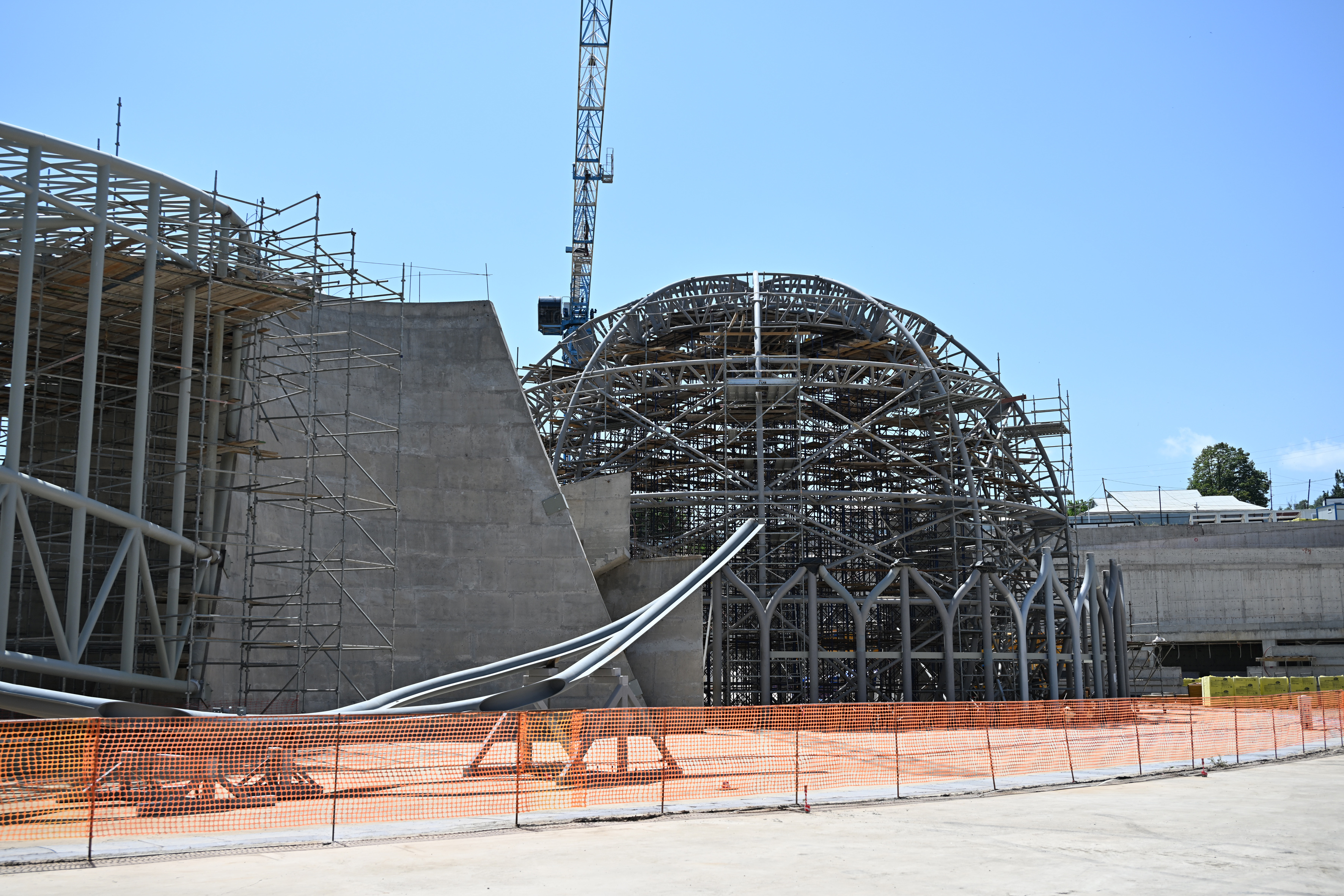
Mosque under construction, July 2025

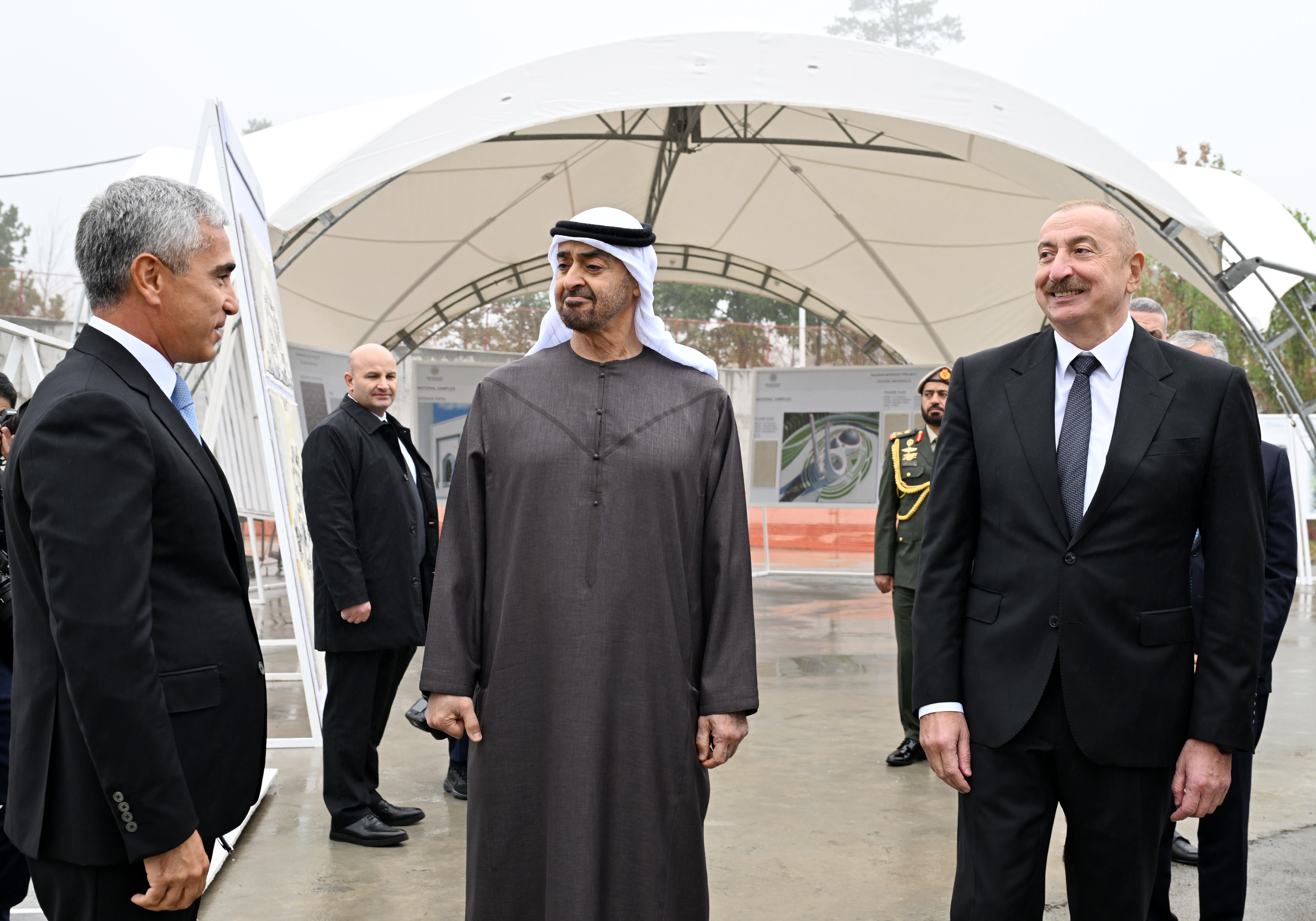
Mohamed bin Zayed Al Nahyan and Ilham Aliyev at the construction site

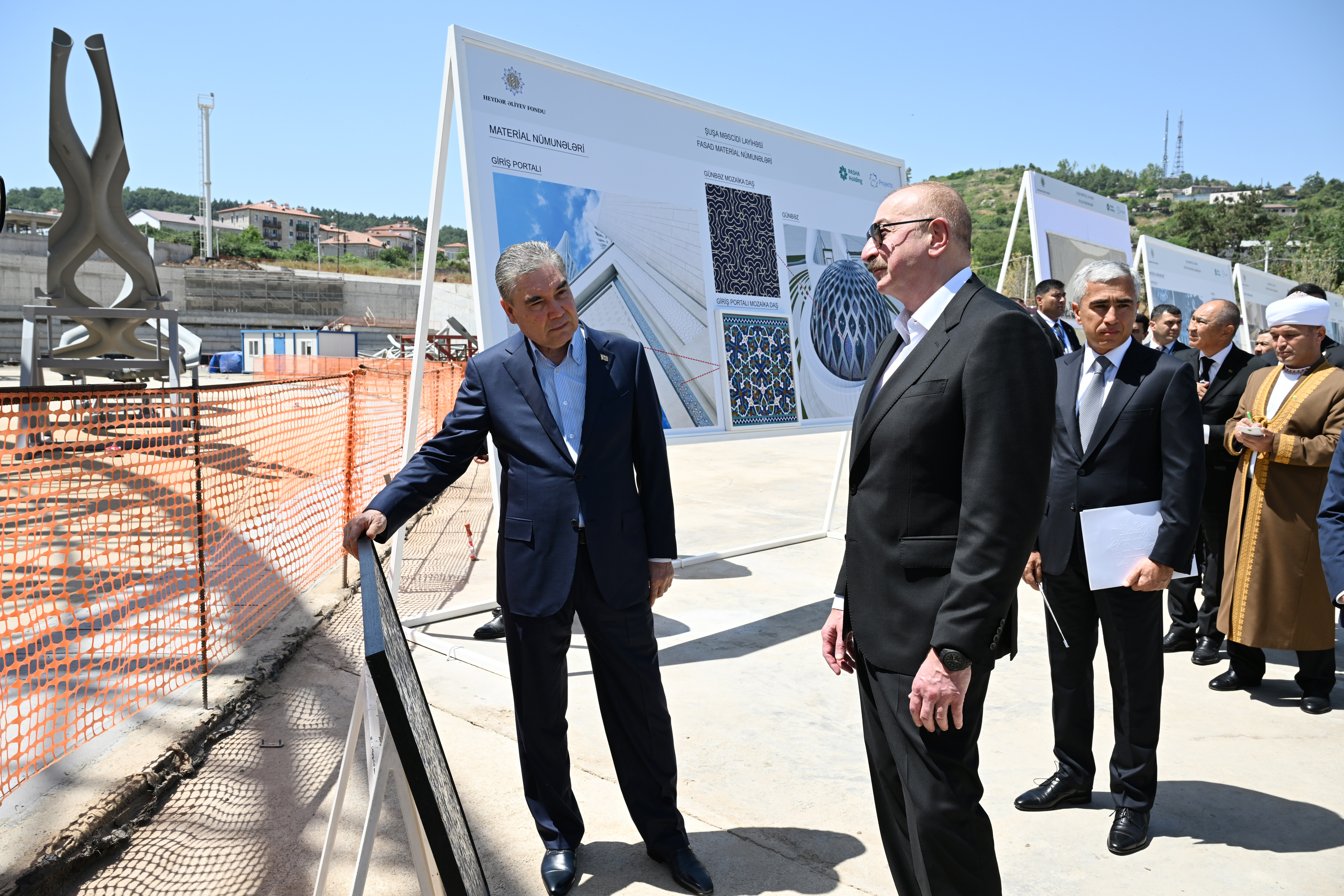
Gurbanguly Berdimuhamedow and Ilham Aliyev at the construction site

== See also ==
- Mosques in Azerbaijan
