= Birinji Nugadi Village Mosque =

19th century mosque in Guba region, Azerbaijan

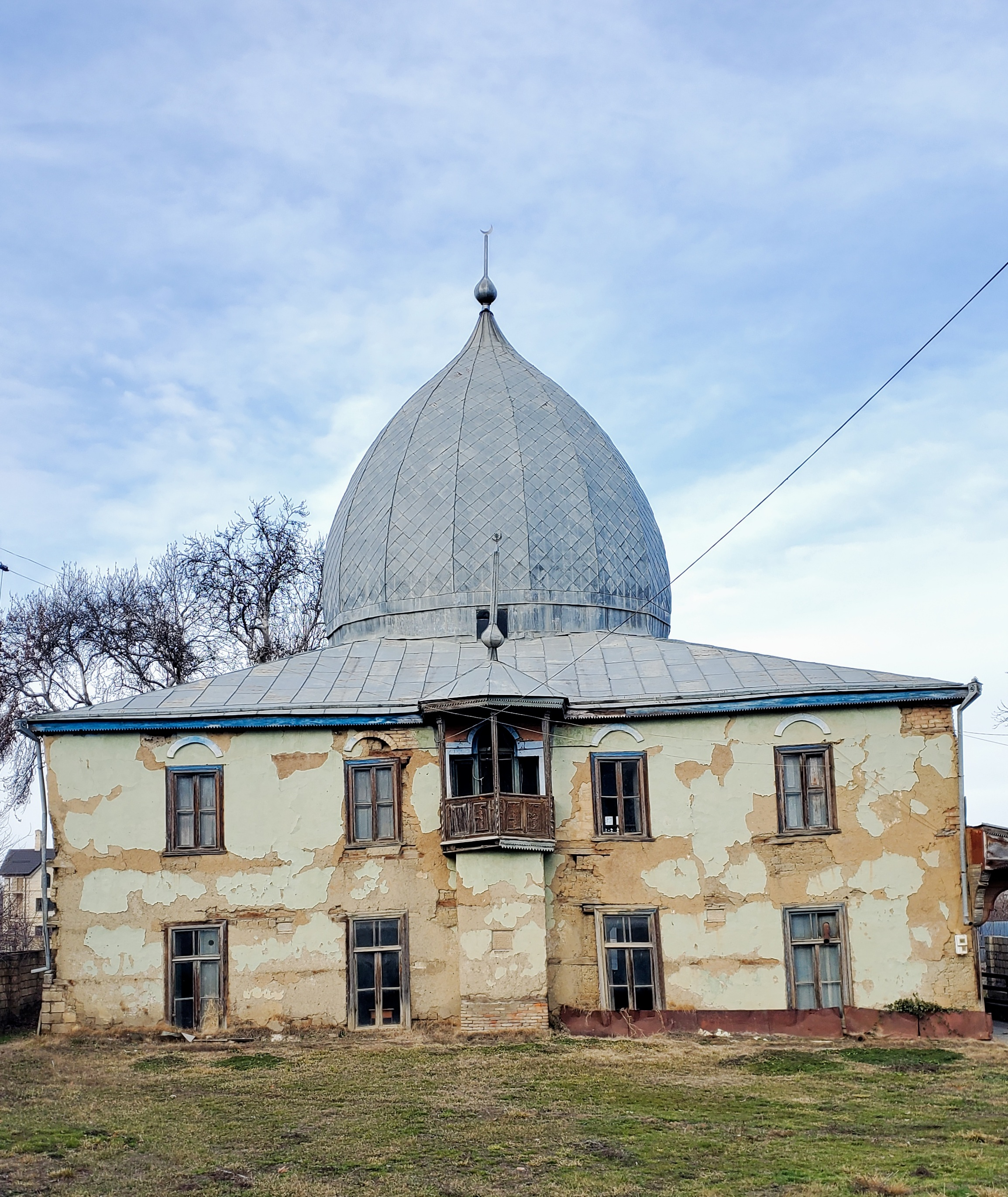
- The mosque in 2021

- Location of the mosque in Azerbaijan

Religion
- Affiliation: Islam
- Ecclesiastical or organizational status: Mosque (19th century–1928); Profane use (1930–1992); Mosque (since 1992)
- Status: Active (as of 2021, maybe inactive)

Location
- Location: Birinci Nügədi, Quba
- Country: Azerbaijan
- Interactive map of Birinji Nugadi Village Mosque
- Coordinates: 41°19′28″N 48°33′41″E

Architecture
- Type: Mosque architecture
- Completed: 19th century

Specifications
- Dome: One
- Minaret: One
- Minaret height: 15 m (49 ft)
- Materials: Bricks

The Birinji Nugadi Village Mosque is a 19th-century mosque located in the Birinci Nügədi village, of the Quba (Guba) region, in Azerbaijan.

== About ==
The Birinji Nugadi village mosque was built by the villagers in the early 19th century. The mosque is built of raw bricks, and the 15 m-high (49 ft) minaret is made of red brick. The minaret was built between 10 and 13 years before the mosque. At first, the minaret was built at the same time as the mosque. However, the mosque was later found to be small, and it was demolished and replaced by the current mosque.

After the Soviet occupation in 1930, the mosque was used as a movie club, gym and warehouse. The surrounding cells were given to the kindergarten. During its operation as a warehouse, the wooden floors of the mosque were demolished and replaced with surface stones. The roof of the mosque was repaired in 1986 due to erosion. The roof was replaced and the external façades were renewed. However, the inside has not been repaired.

After Azerbaijan gained independence, the mosque was restored. However, as of 2021, the mosque was in need of repairs. The mosque's religious community is registered with the State Committee.

== Gallery ==
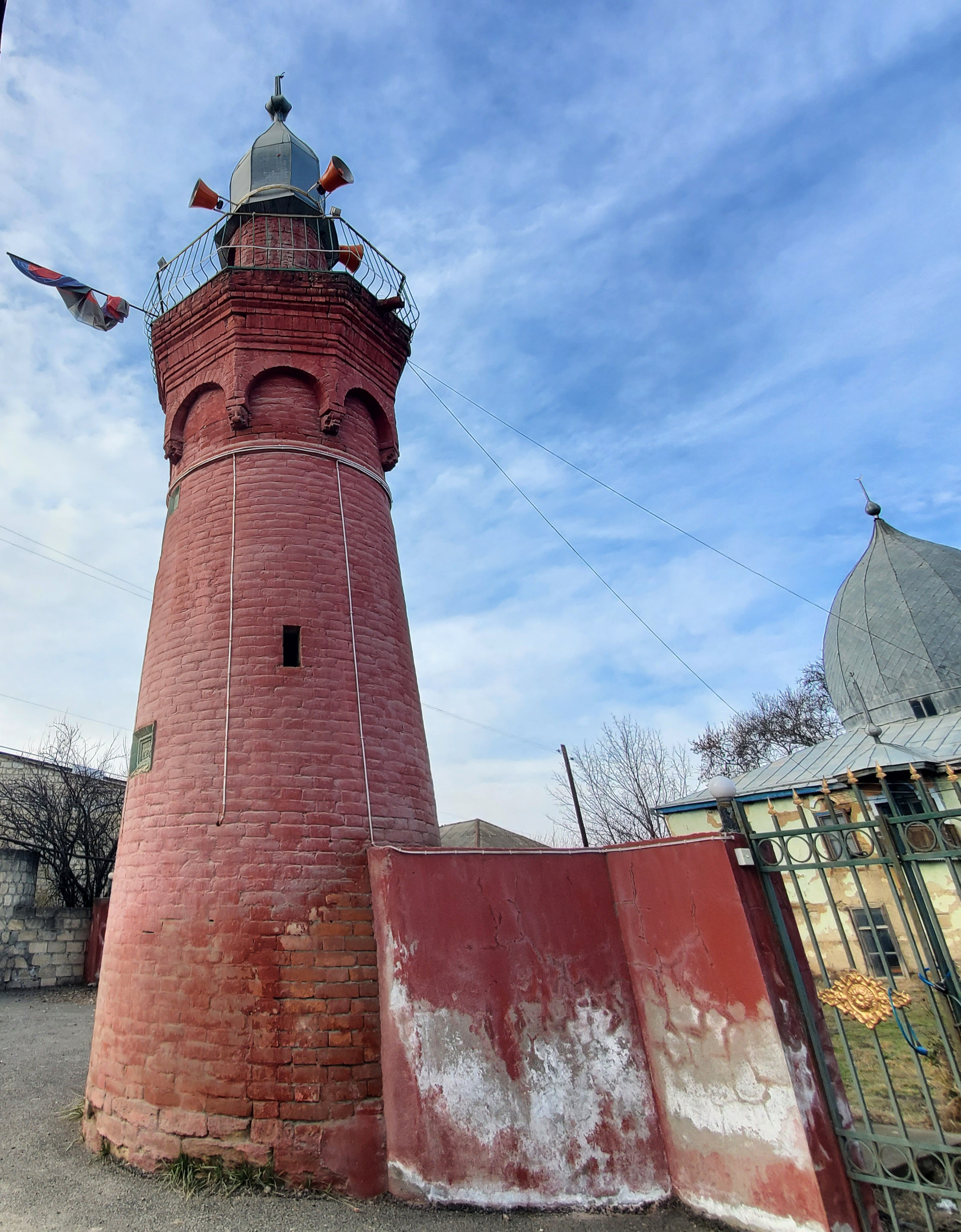
The minaret, built before the mosque

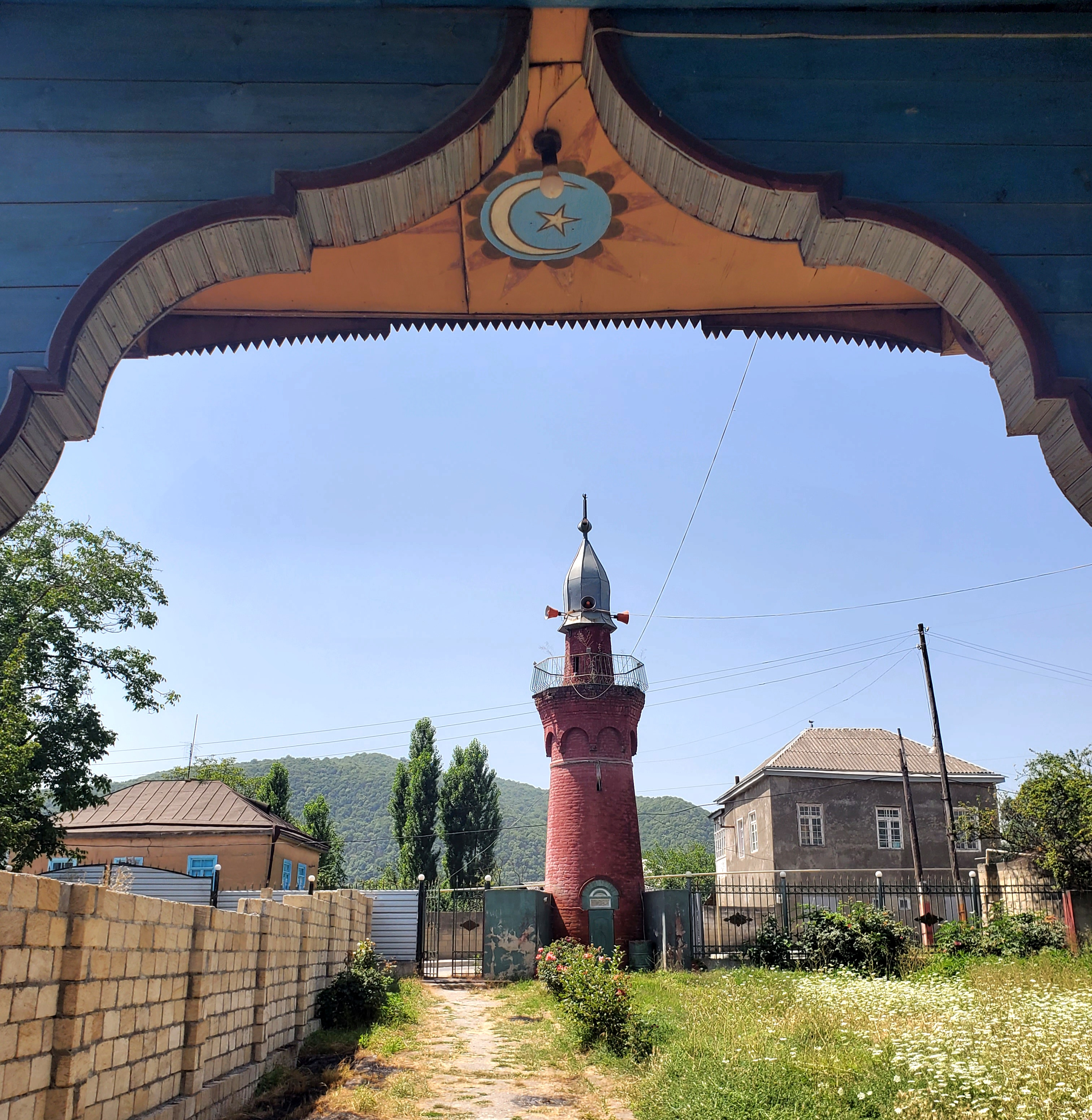

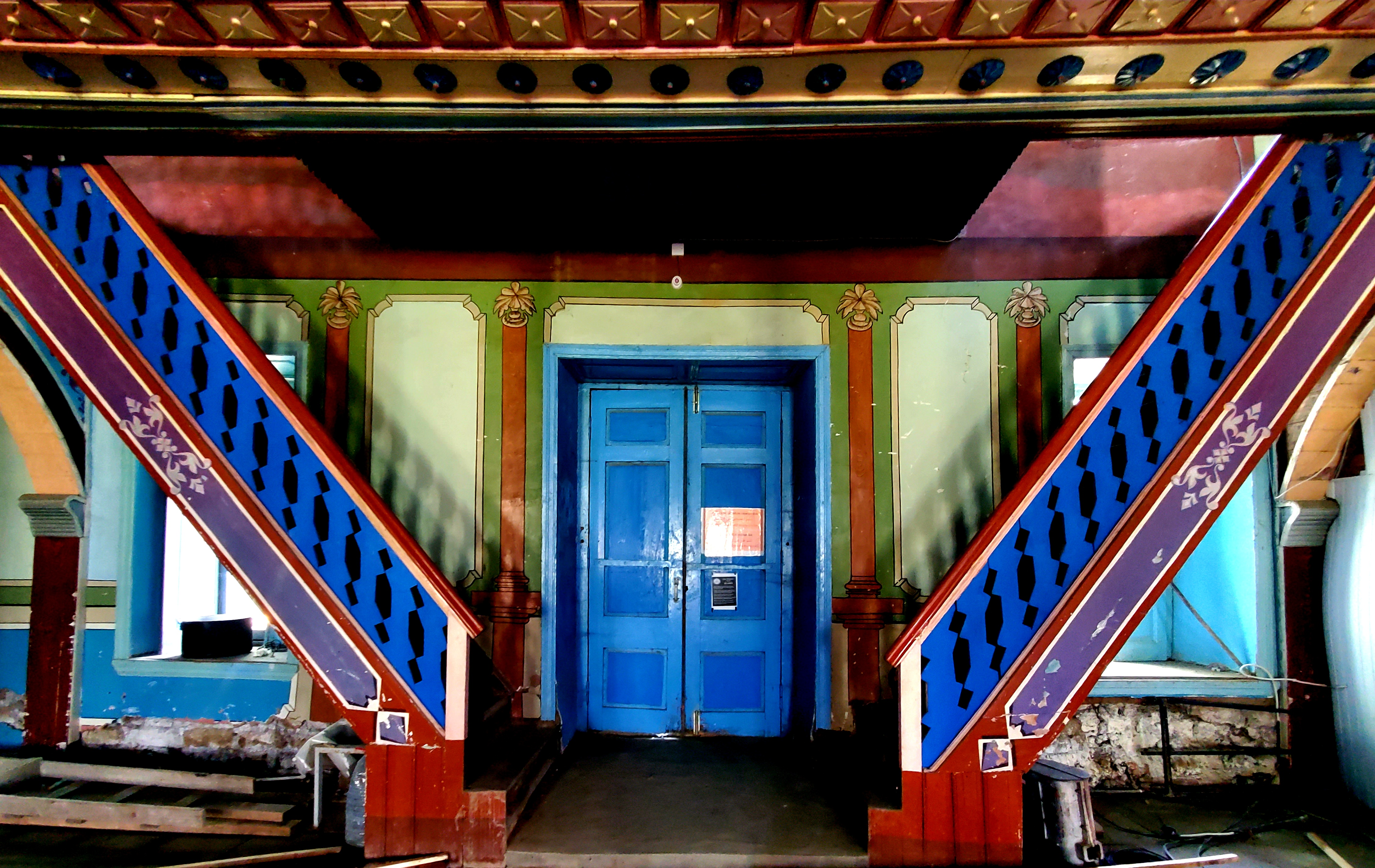

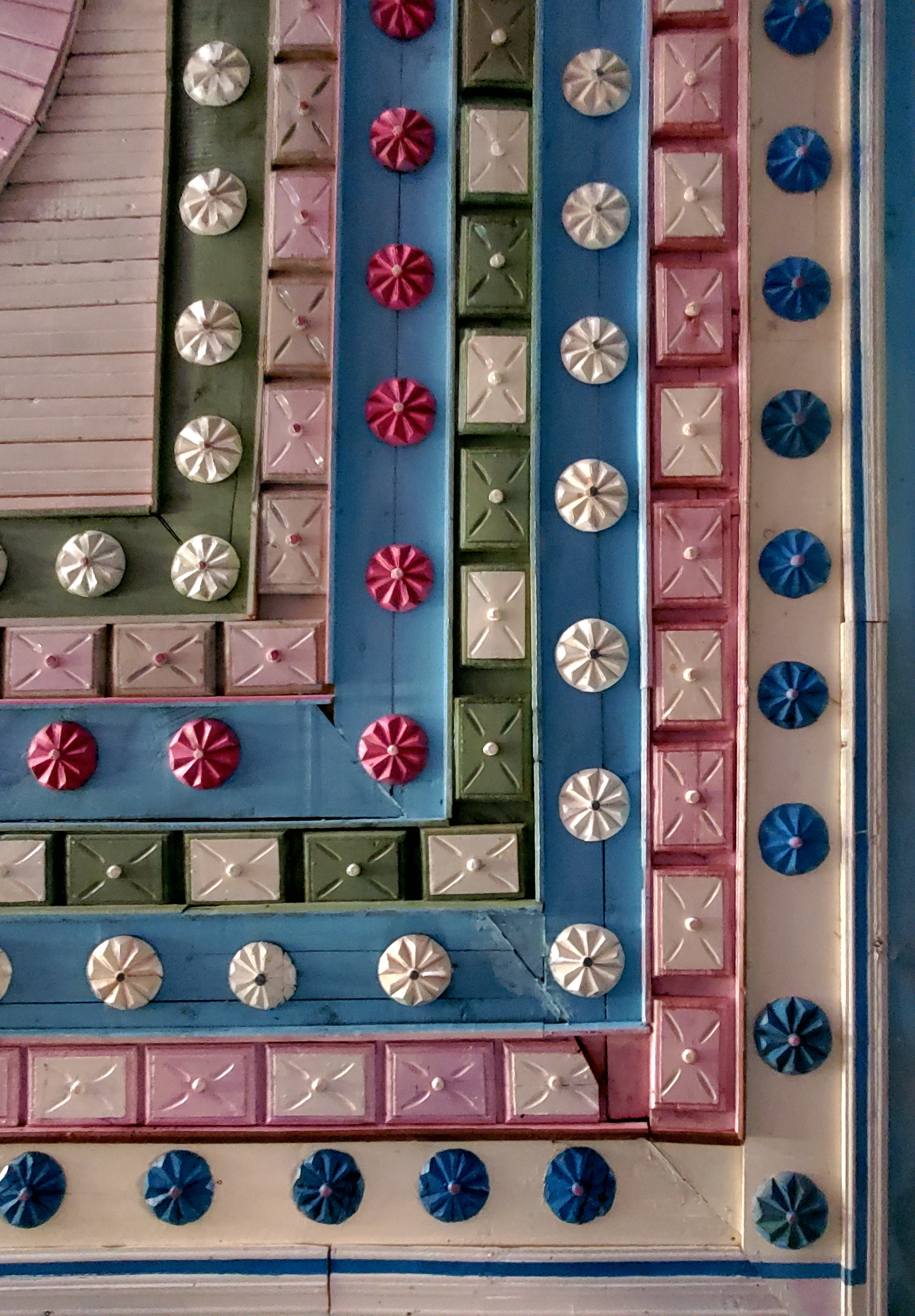

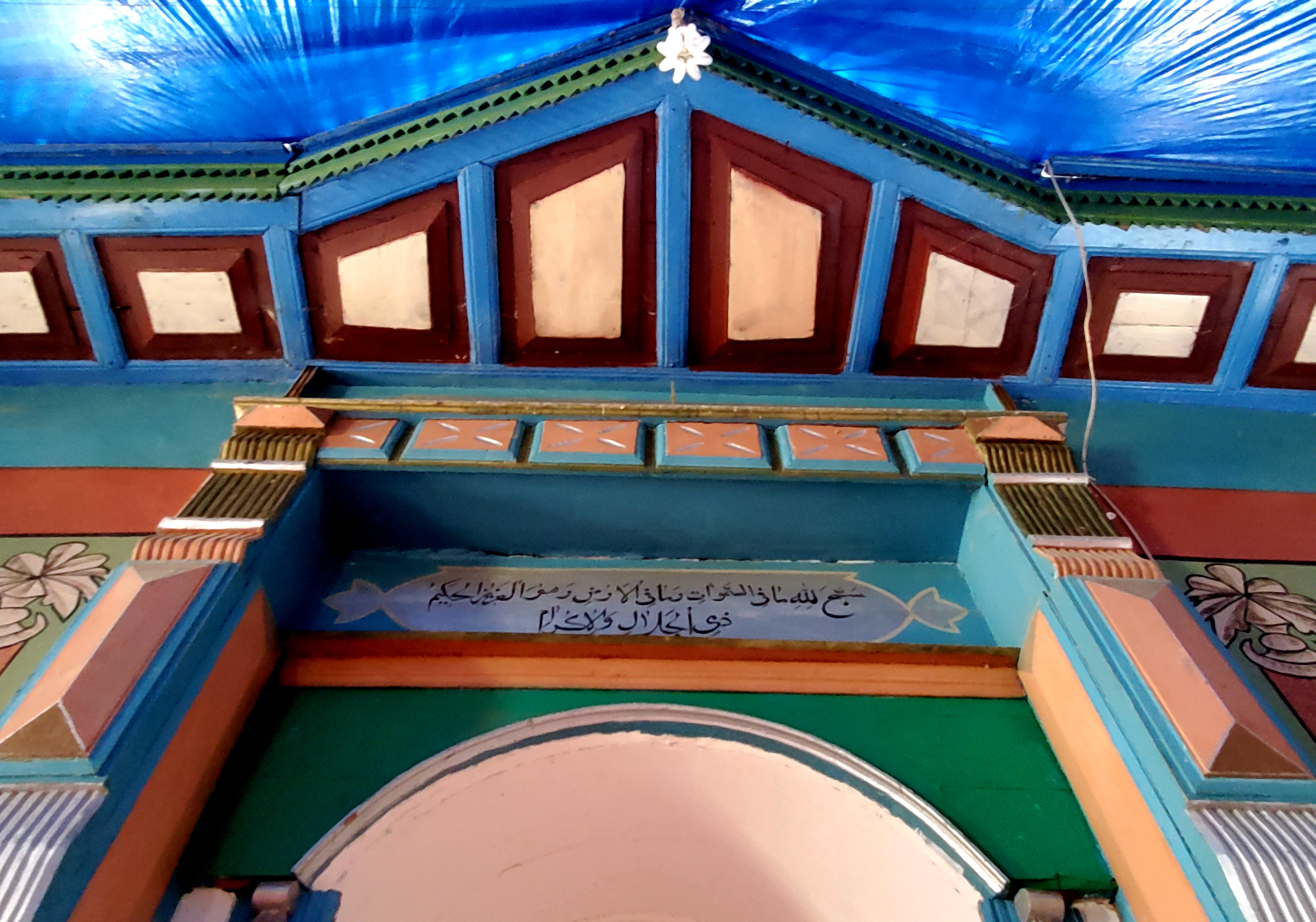

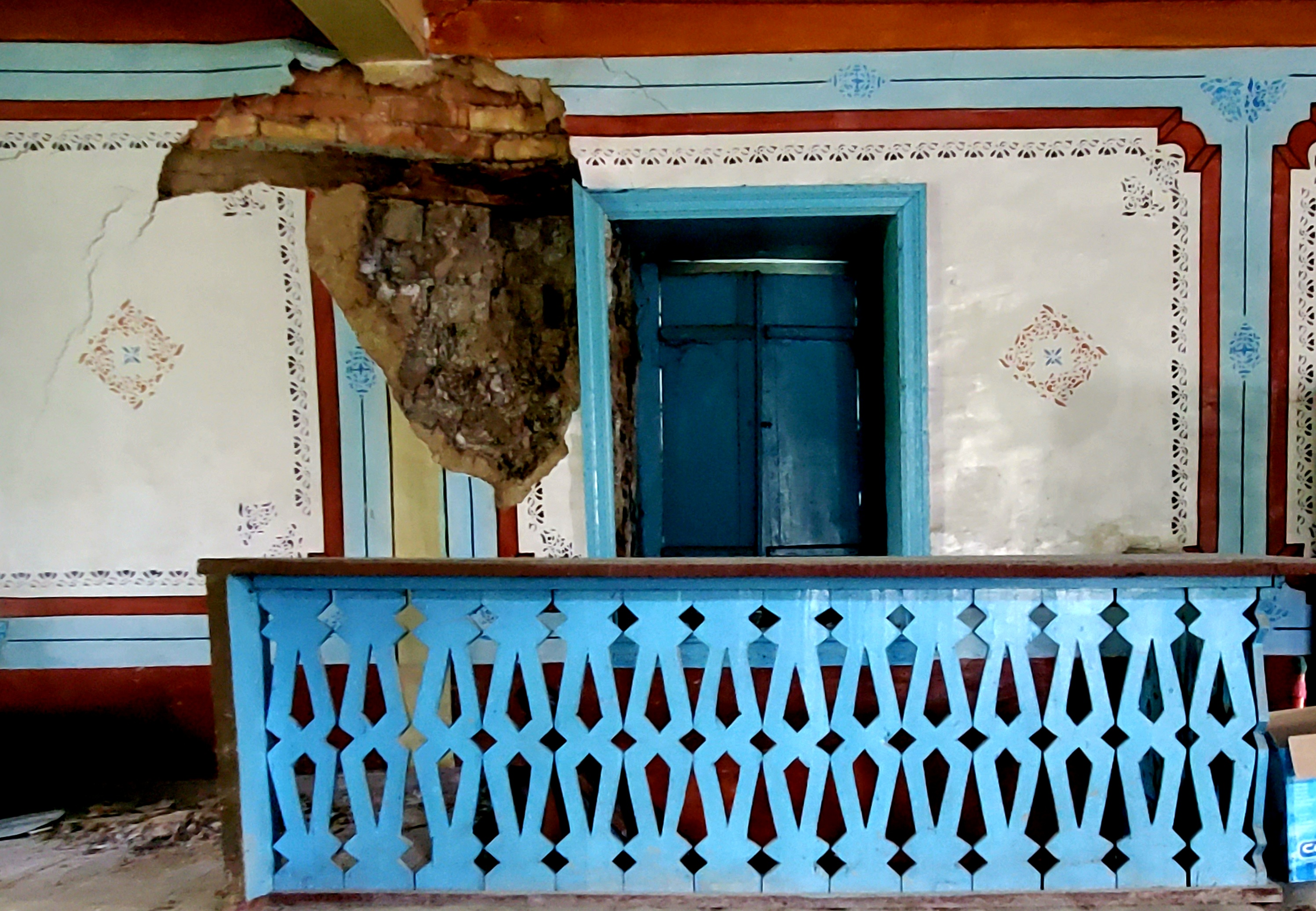

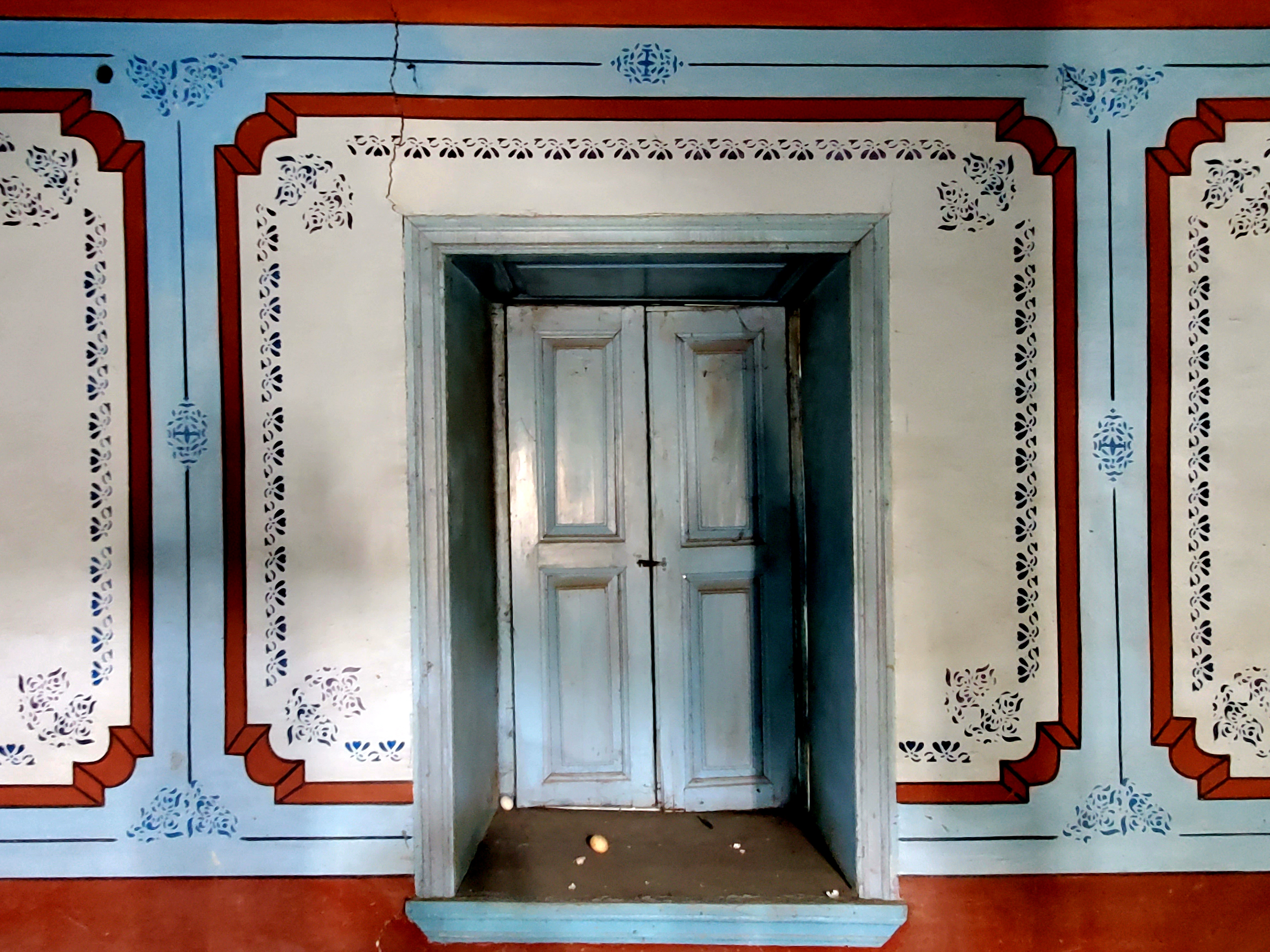

== See also ==
- Islam in Azerbaijan
- List of mosques in Azerbaijan
