= Shah Sultan Hussein Mosque =

Former mosque in Novkhany, Azerbaijan

Shah Sultan Hussein mosque
- Azerbaijani: Şah Sultan Hüseyn məscidi
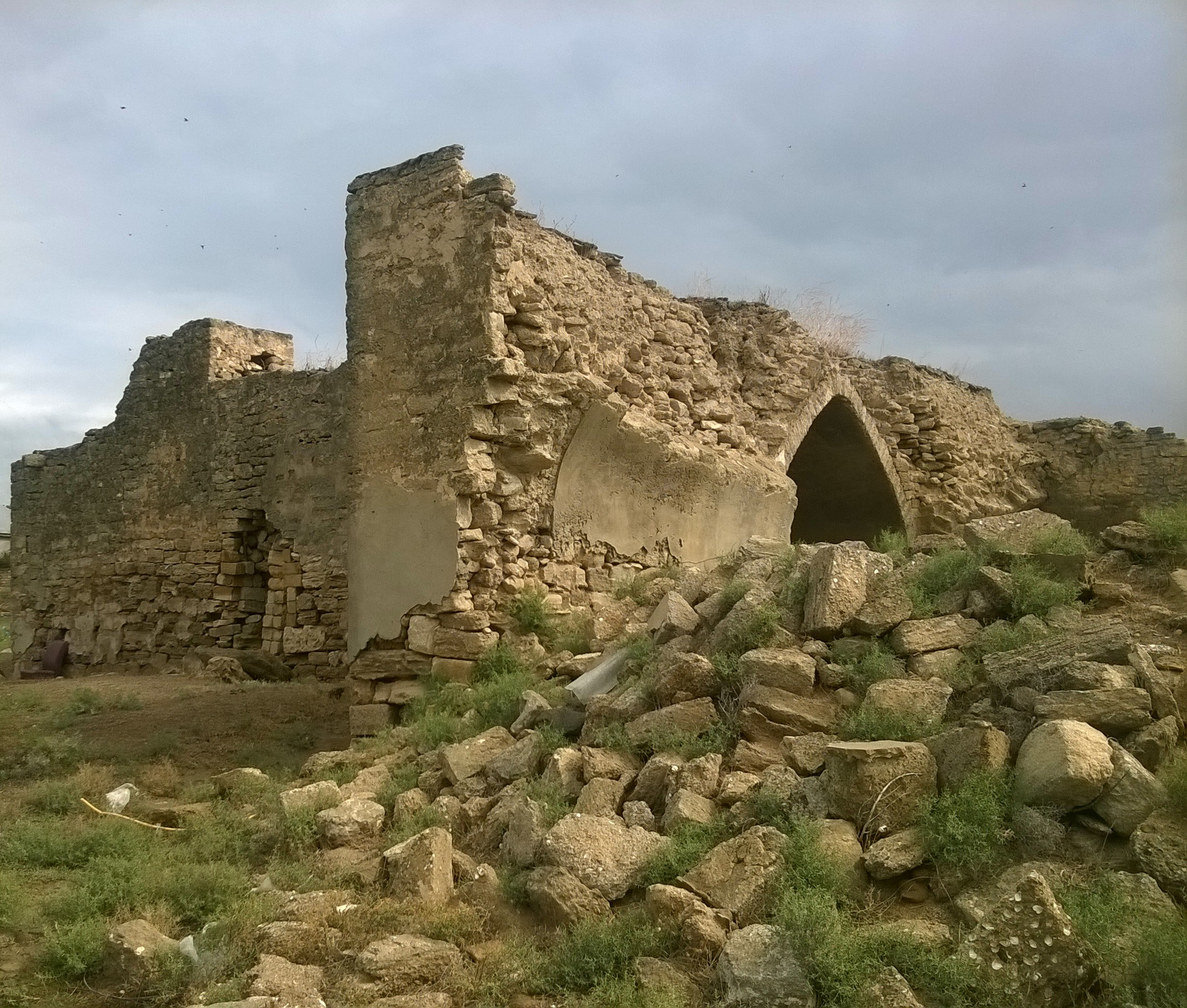
- Ruins of the former mosque in 2017

- Location of the former mosque in Azerbaijan

Religion
- Affiliation: Islam (former)
- Ecclesiastical or organizational status: Mosque (18th century–1928); Profane use (1928–1991)
- Status: Abandoned (ruinous state)

Location
- Location: Novkhany, Absheron
- Country: Azerbaijan
- Interactive map of Shah Sultan Hussein mosque
- Coordinates: 40°33′47″N 49°46′46″E

Architecture
- Type: Mosque architecture
- Style: Islamic; Shirvan-Absheron
- Completed: 18th century

The Shah Sultan Hussein Mosque (Azerbaijani: Şah Sultan Hüseyn Məscidi) is a former mosque, located in the village of Novkhany in Absheron district of Azerbaijan, 21 km (13 mi) from Baku. Completed in the 18th century, it is estimated that the former mosque was once located in the center of an ancient residential center, which currently is a desert.

== Overview ==
The mosque belongs to architectural school of Absheron.

Although the size of the mosque is small, size and tone keeps architectural elements in the walls. Motifs and architectural elements of the walls of the mosque, which are not large, are still preserved. The walls of the prayer room are decorated with ornaments. The dome is one of the basic constructions in the prayer room. The main function of it is to keep the atmosphere of the hall constant, illuminate the hall, and create a reverberation in the hall. The exterior of the mosque and its architectural solution form unity. Prayer room is merged with service room.

In the framework of anti-religious policies, the mosque was closed to visitors by Soviet authorities in the 1930s. As a result, the mosque was desecrated and became useless.

== Gallery ==
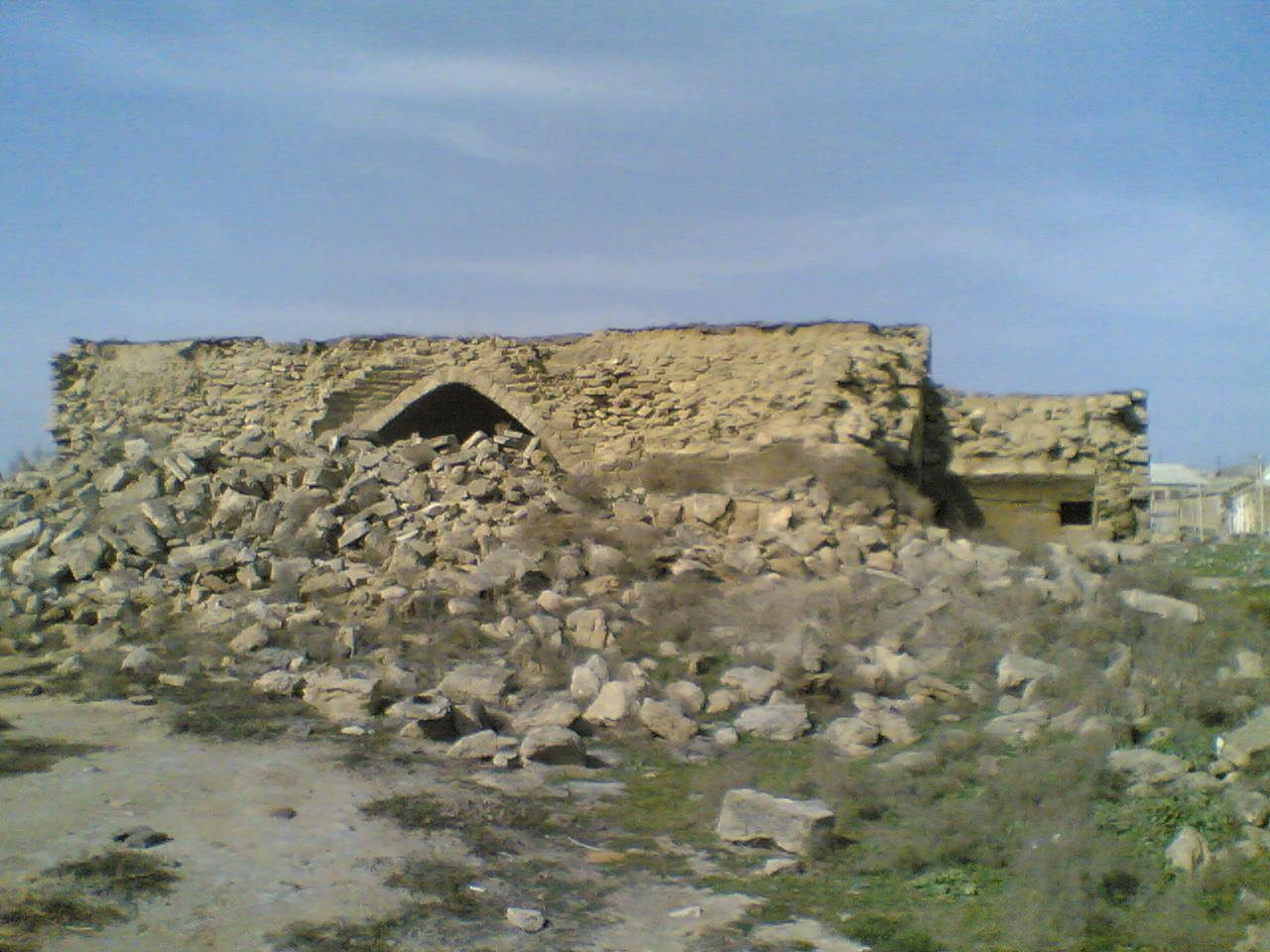

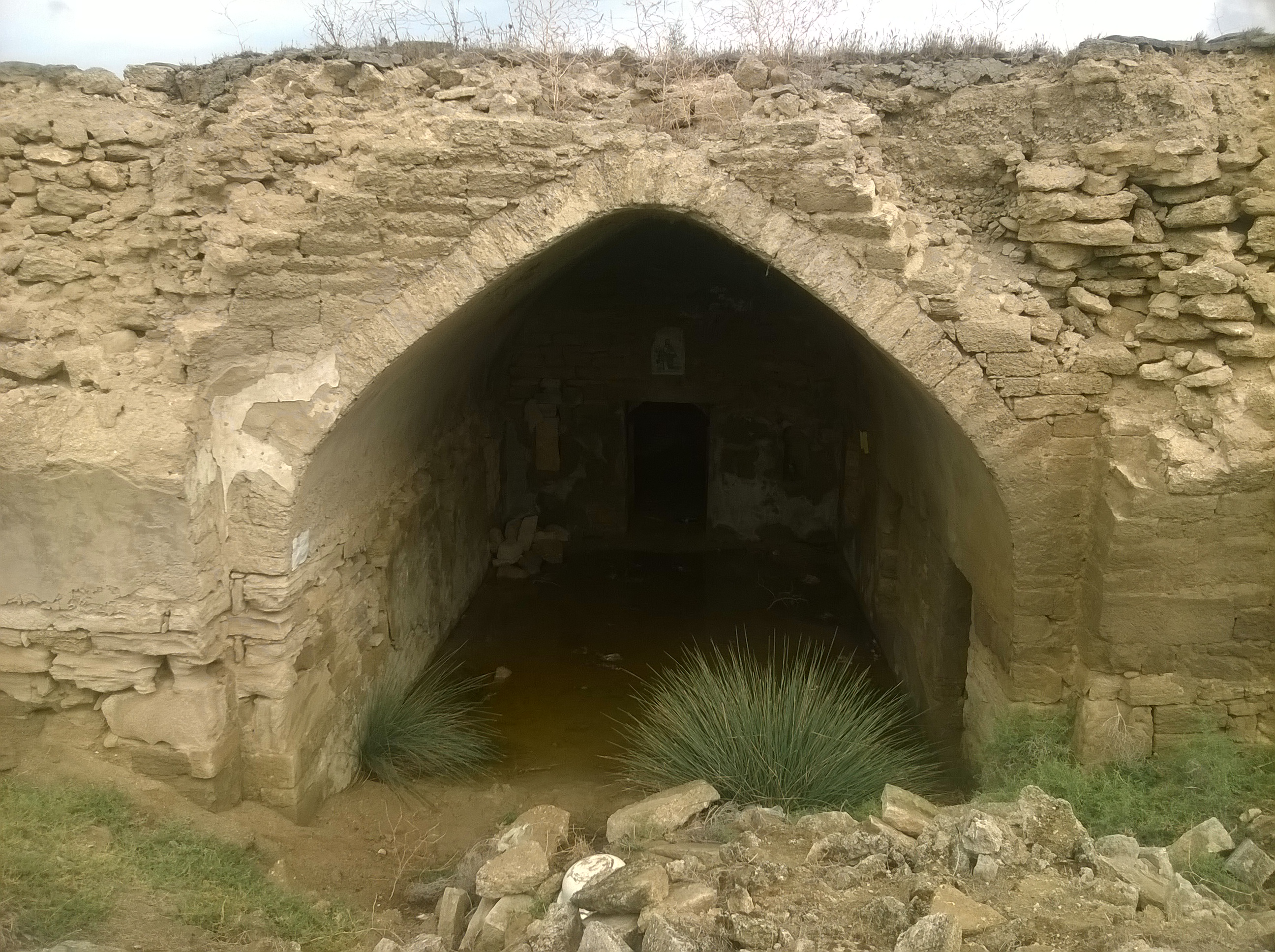

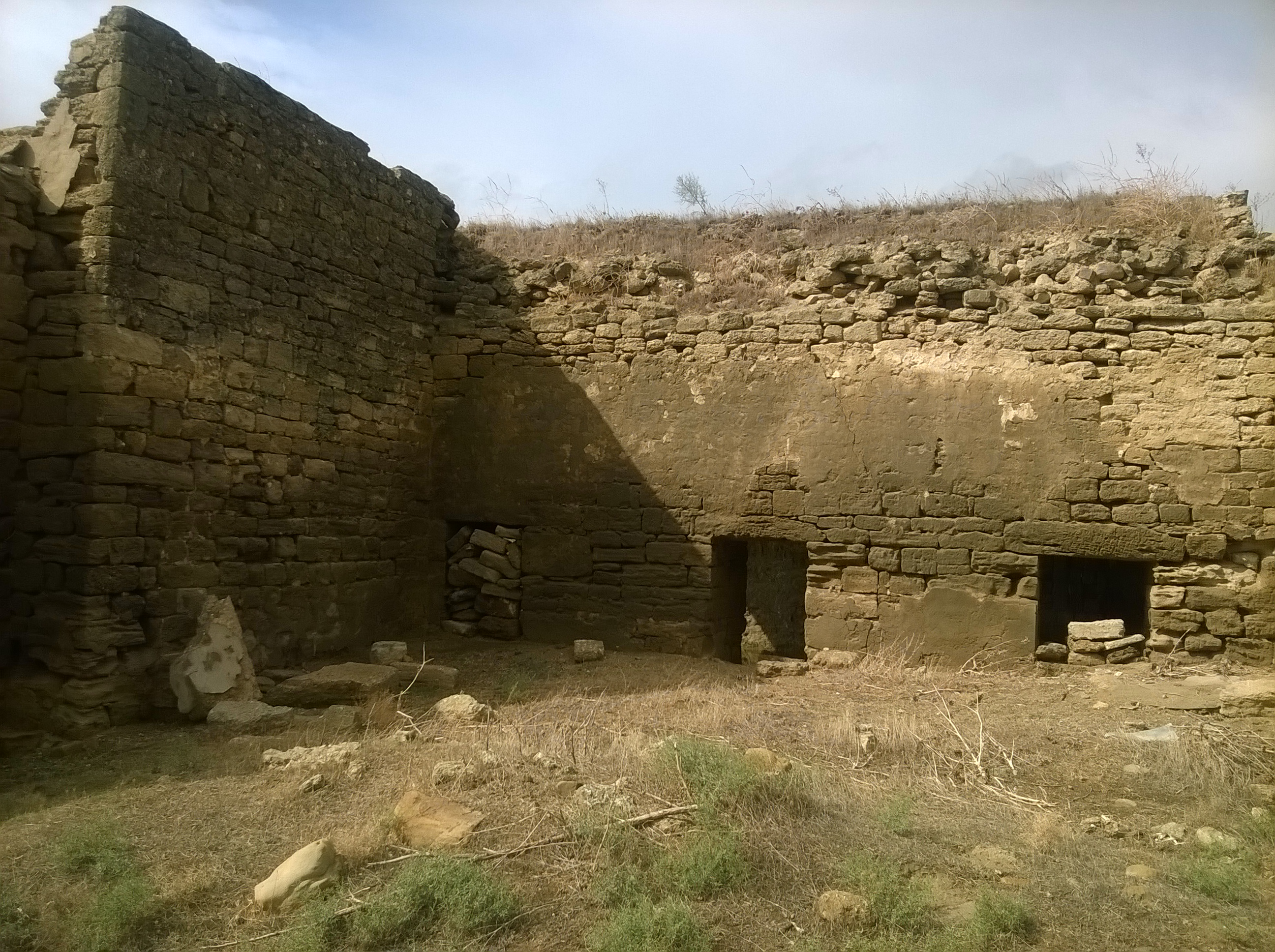

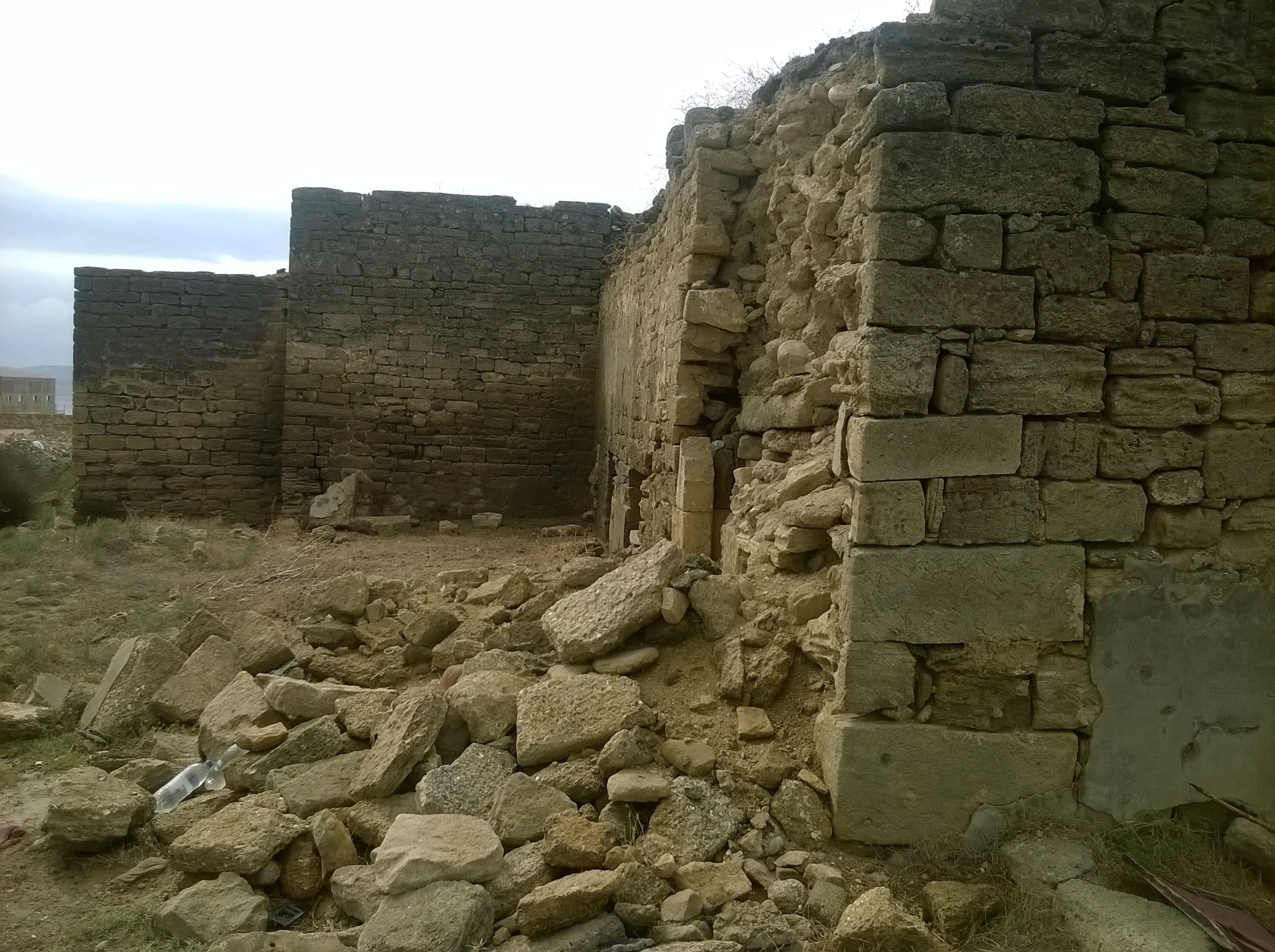

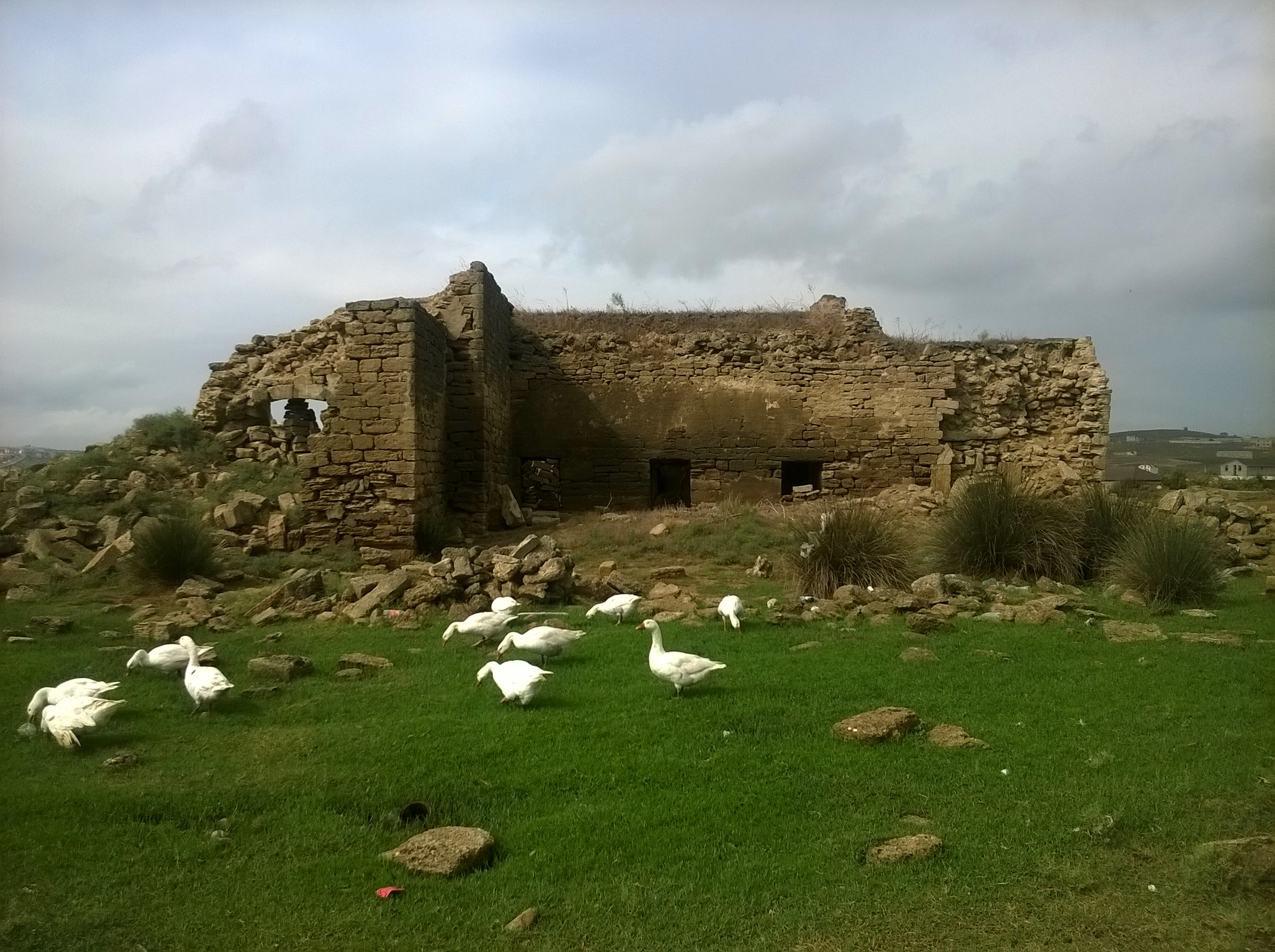

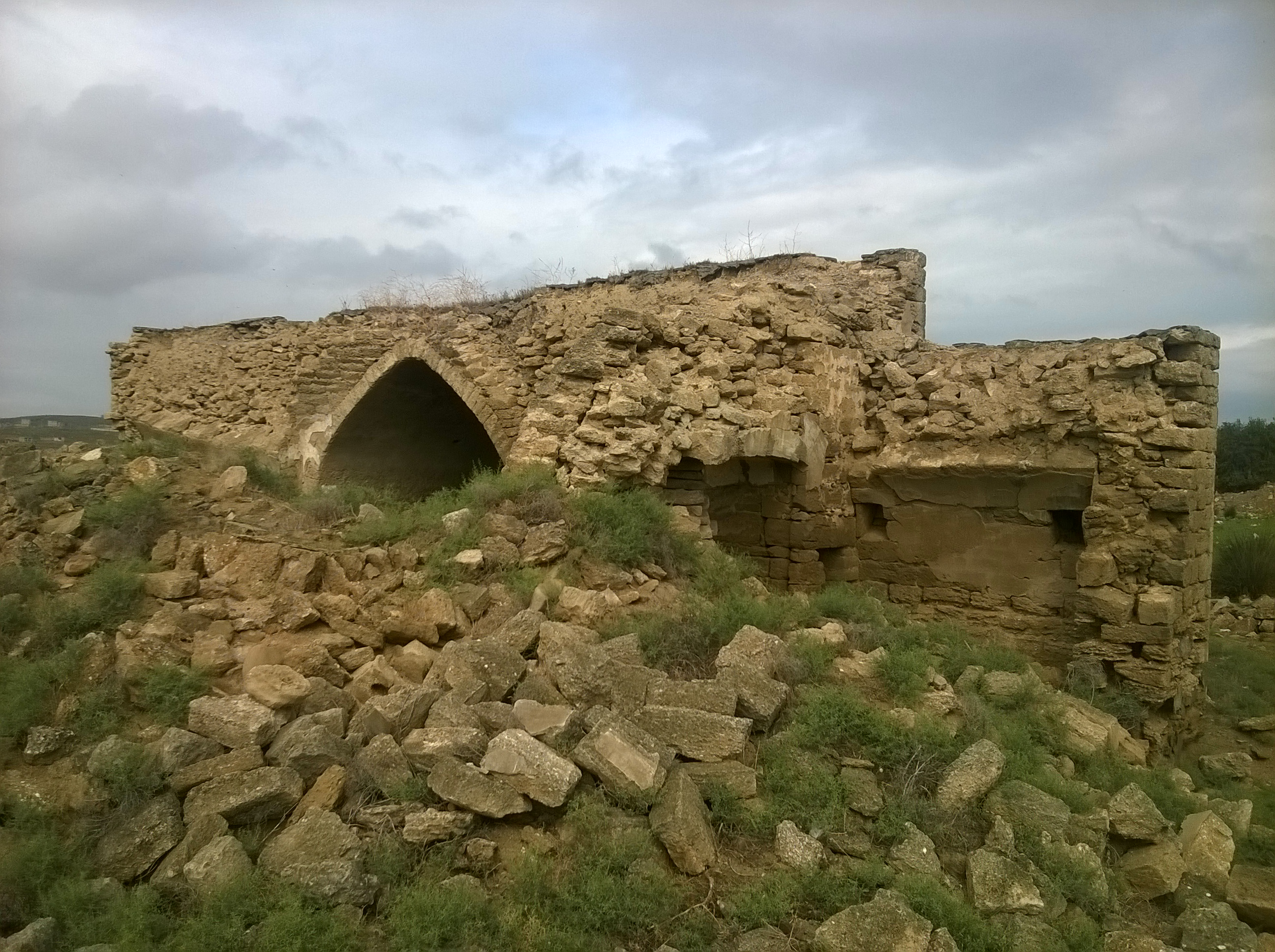

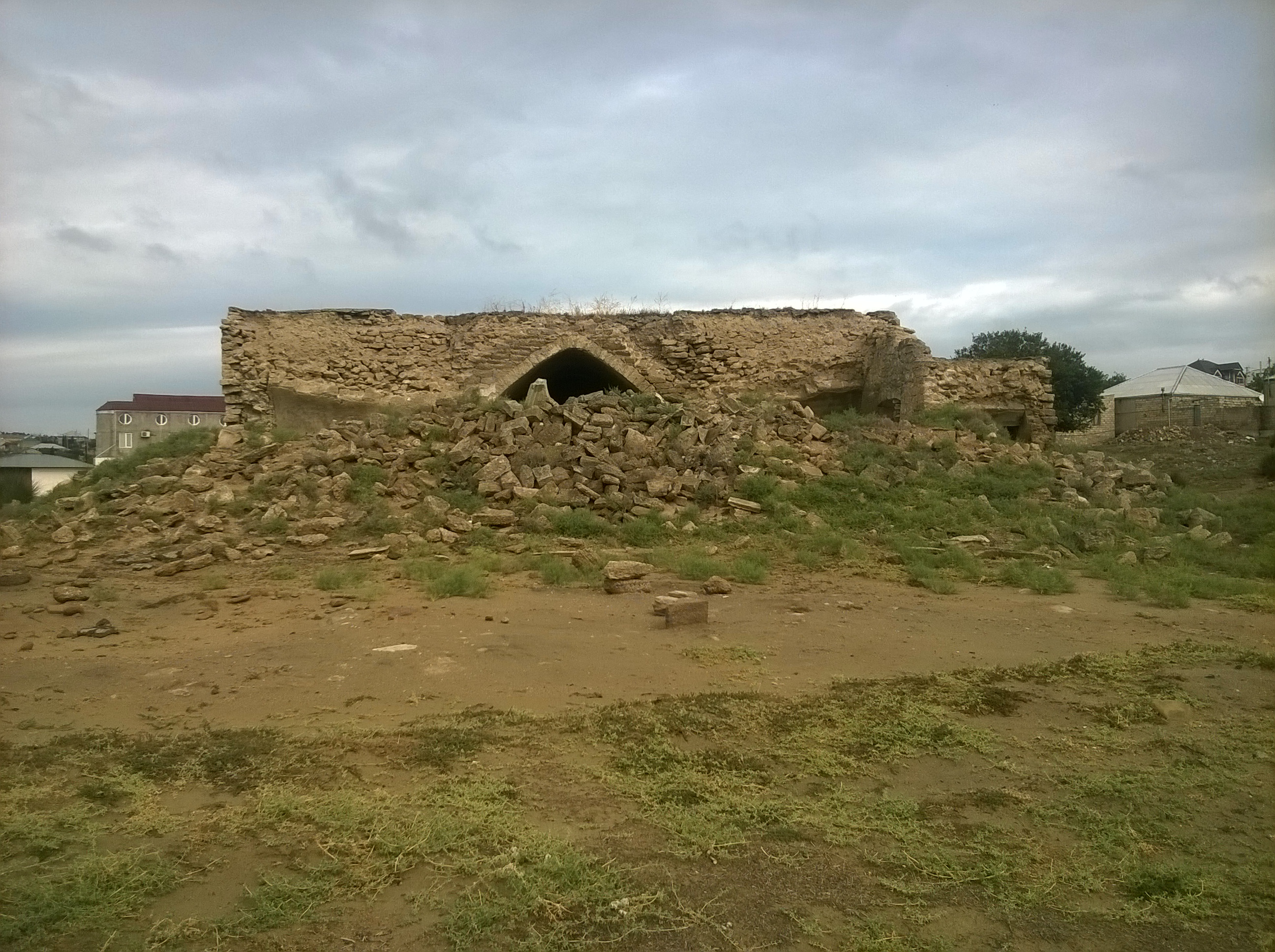

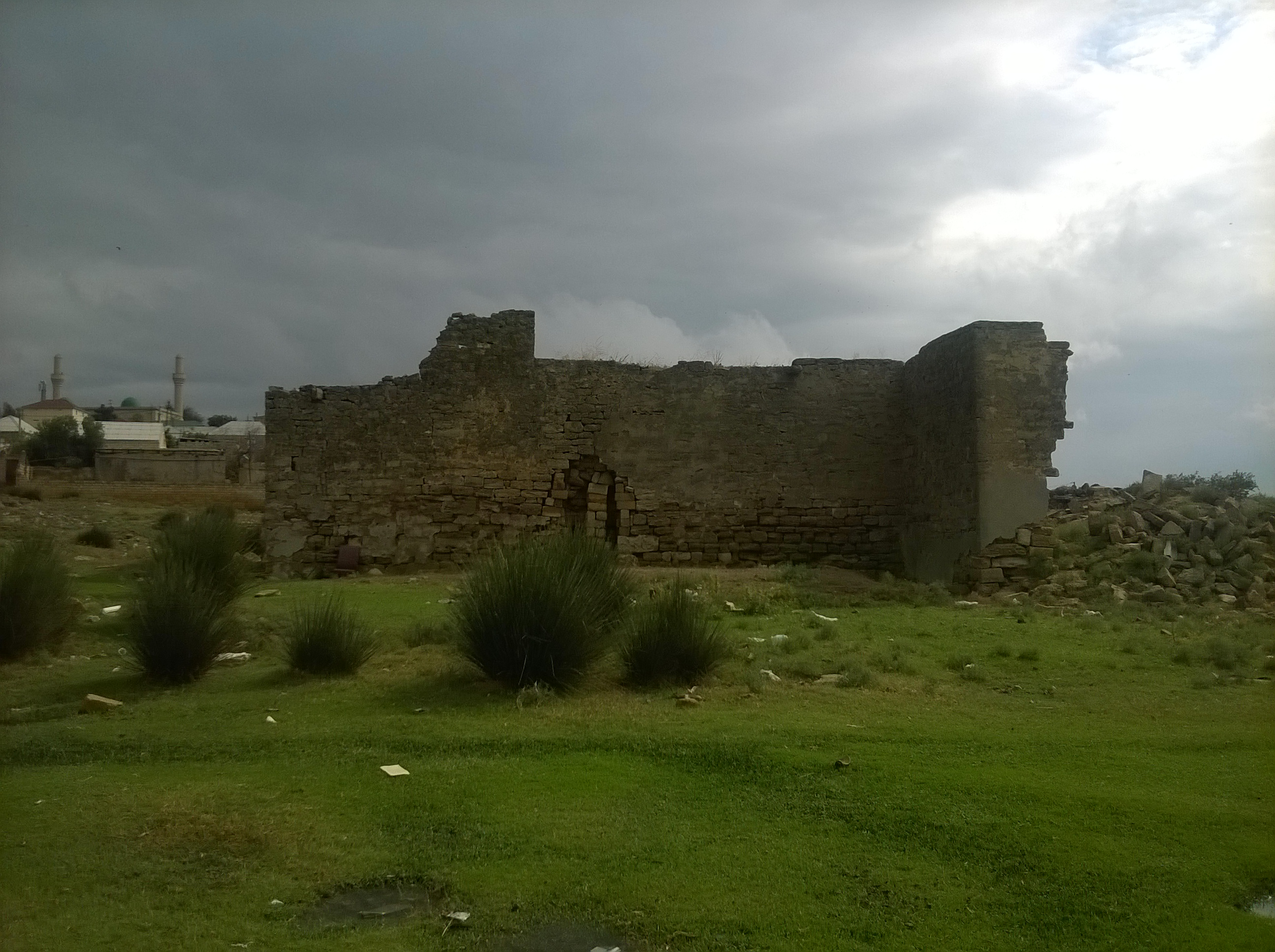

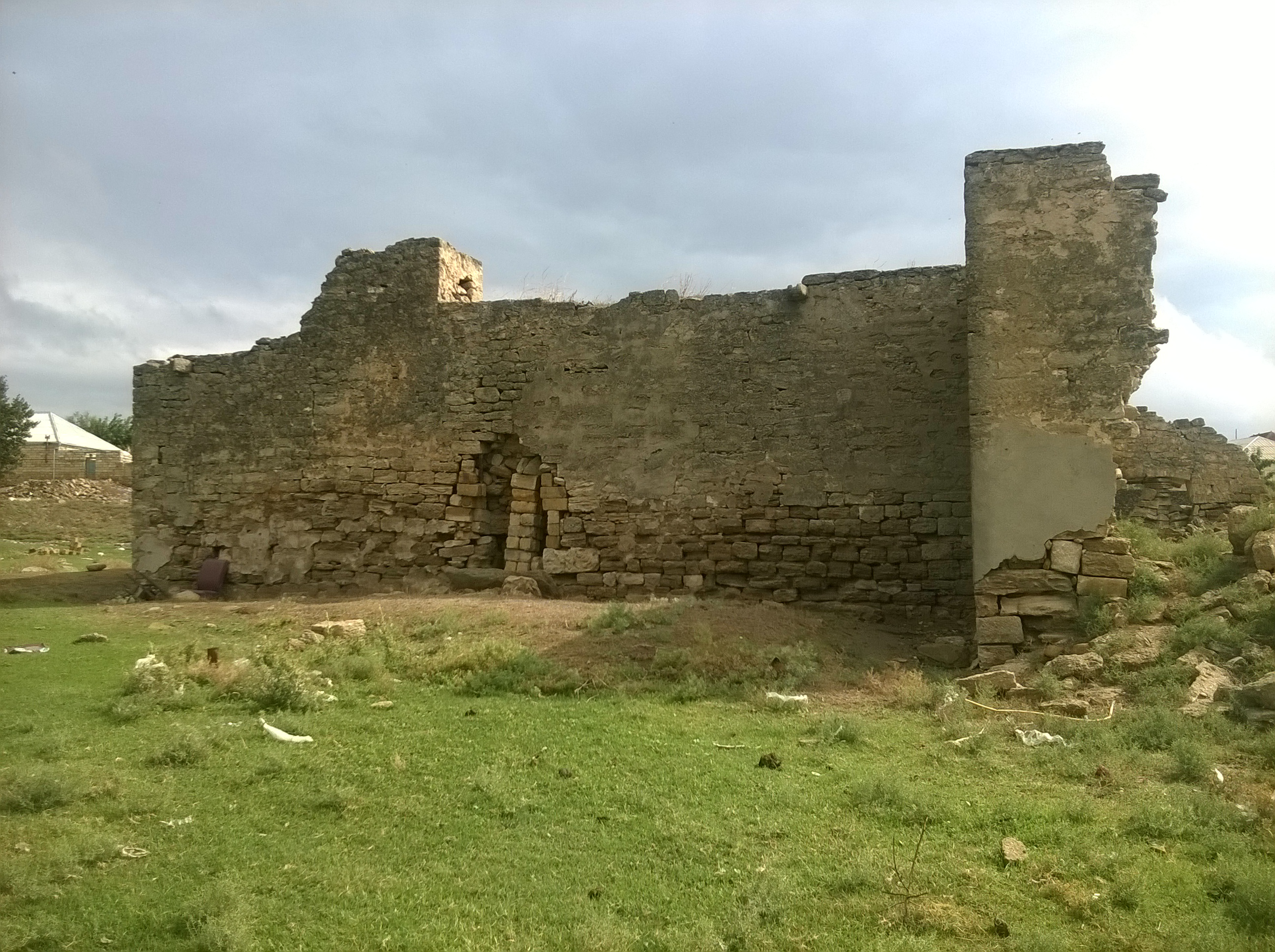

== See also ==
- Islam in Azerbaijan
- List of mosques in Azerbaijan
