= Boradigah =

- Municipality
- Location within Azerbaijan
- Coordinates: 38°55′40″N 48°42′31″E
- Country: Azerbaijan
- Rayon: Masally

Population
  - Total: 5,591
- Time zone: UTC+4 (AZT)
  - Summer (DST): UTC+5 (AZT)

Boradigah is a village and municipality in the Masally Rayon of Azerbaijan. It has a population of 5,591. According to the chamber census conducted on families between May 14 and December 17, 1886, in the village of Boradigah, which is included in the Boradigah village community of Baku province, Lankaran district, Arkivan branch, as well as in the villages of Gazvinoba, Shatyroba, Babaser, Mollaoba and Tukla, which were newly built by the residents of this village, a total of 291 2,628 people (1,508 men and 1,120 women) lived in the house, consisting of Shia Muslim Talysh people.

According to the 2009 census, the population of Boradigah settlement is 10,681 people (6,280 people in the settlement center).

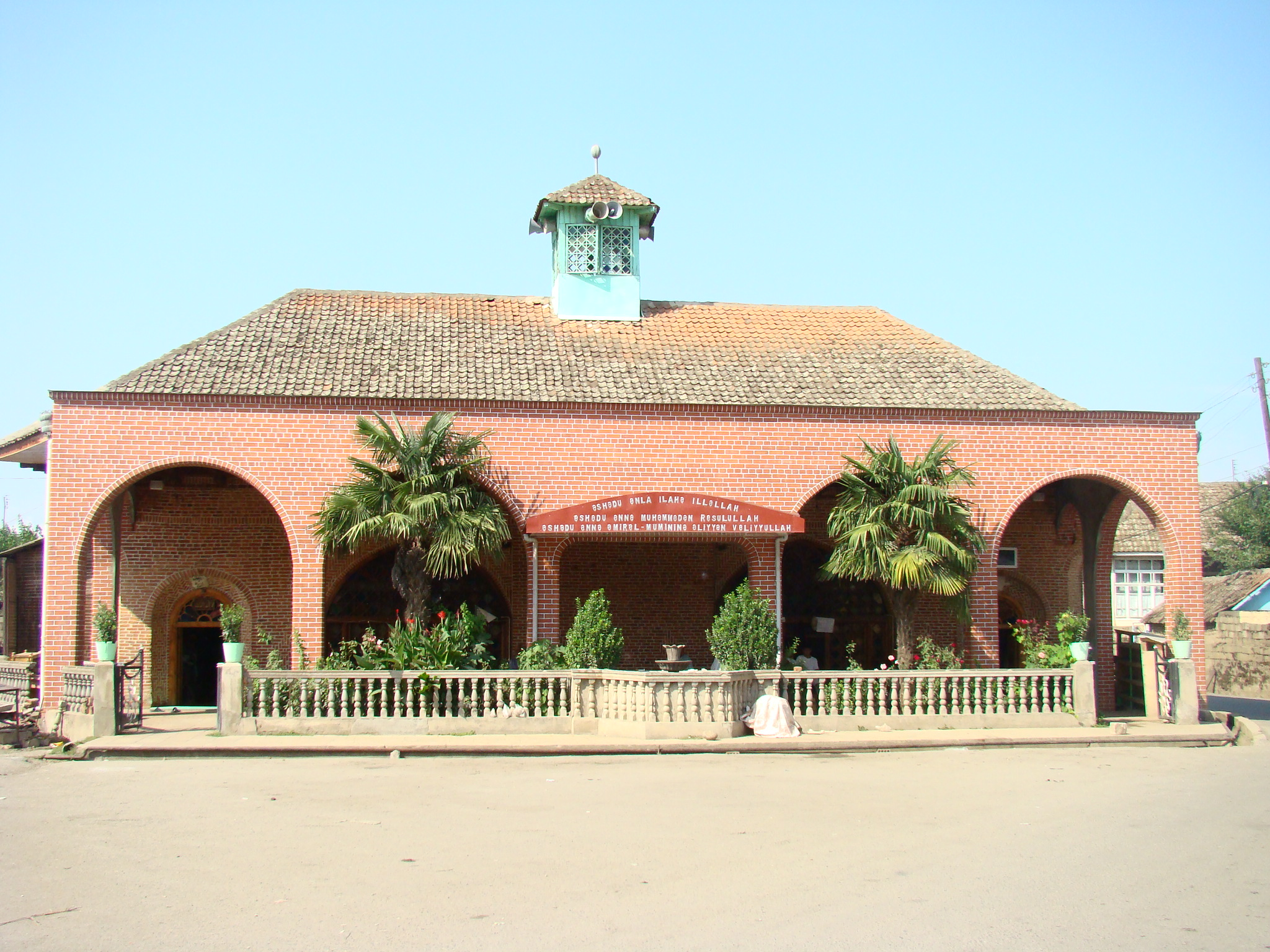
The Juma Mosque in Boradigah

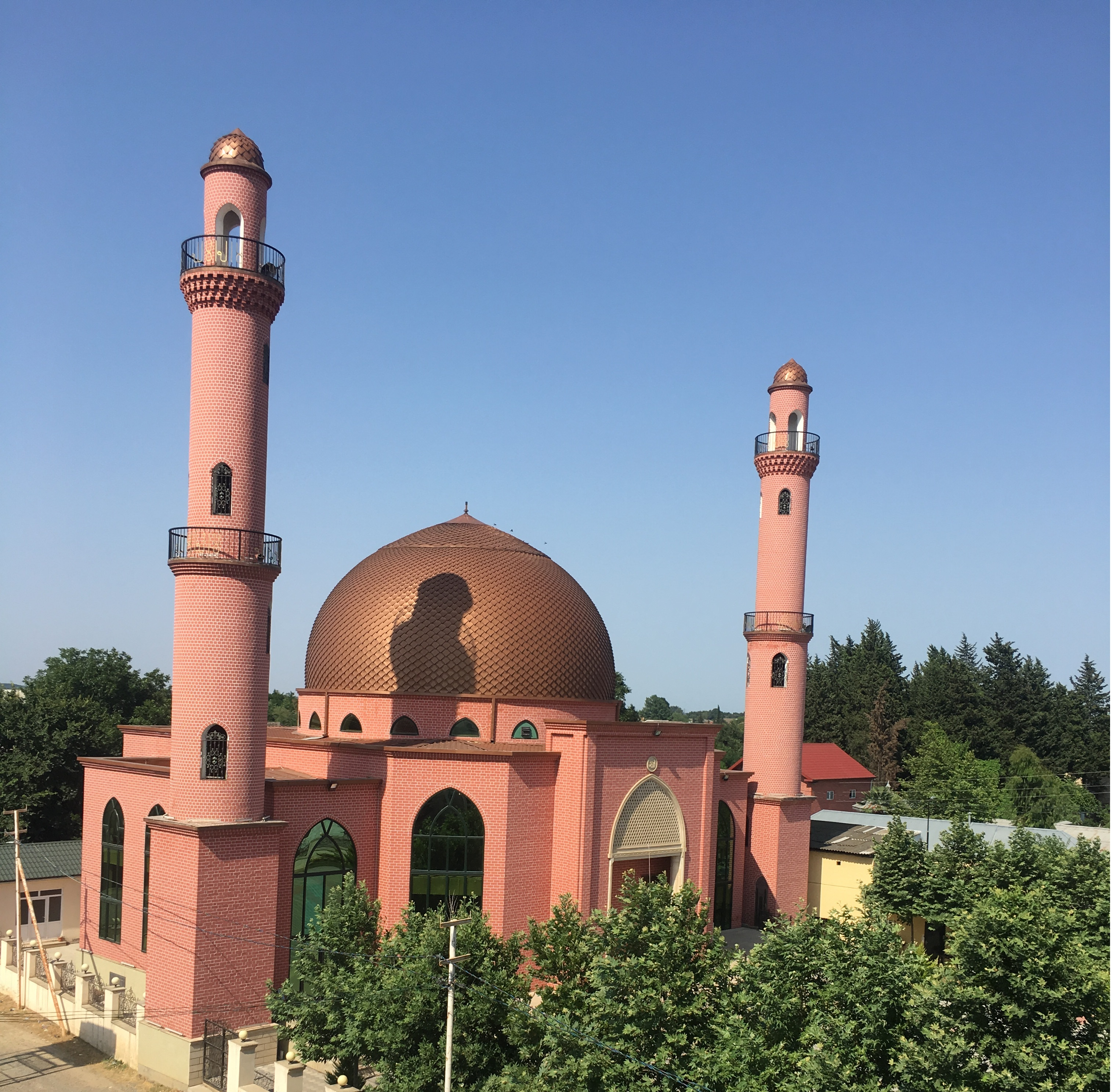
The Ali Moscue in Boradigah
