= Buzovna Juma Mosque =

Mosque in Baku, Azerbaijan

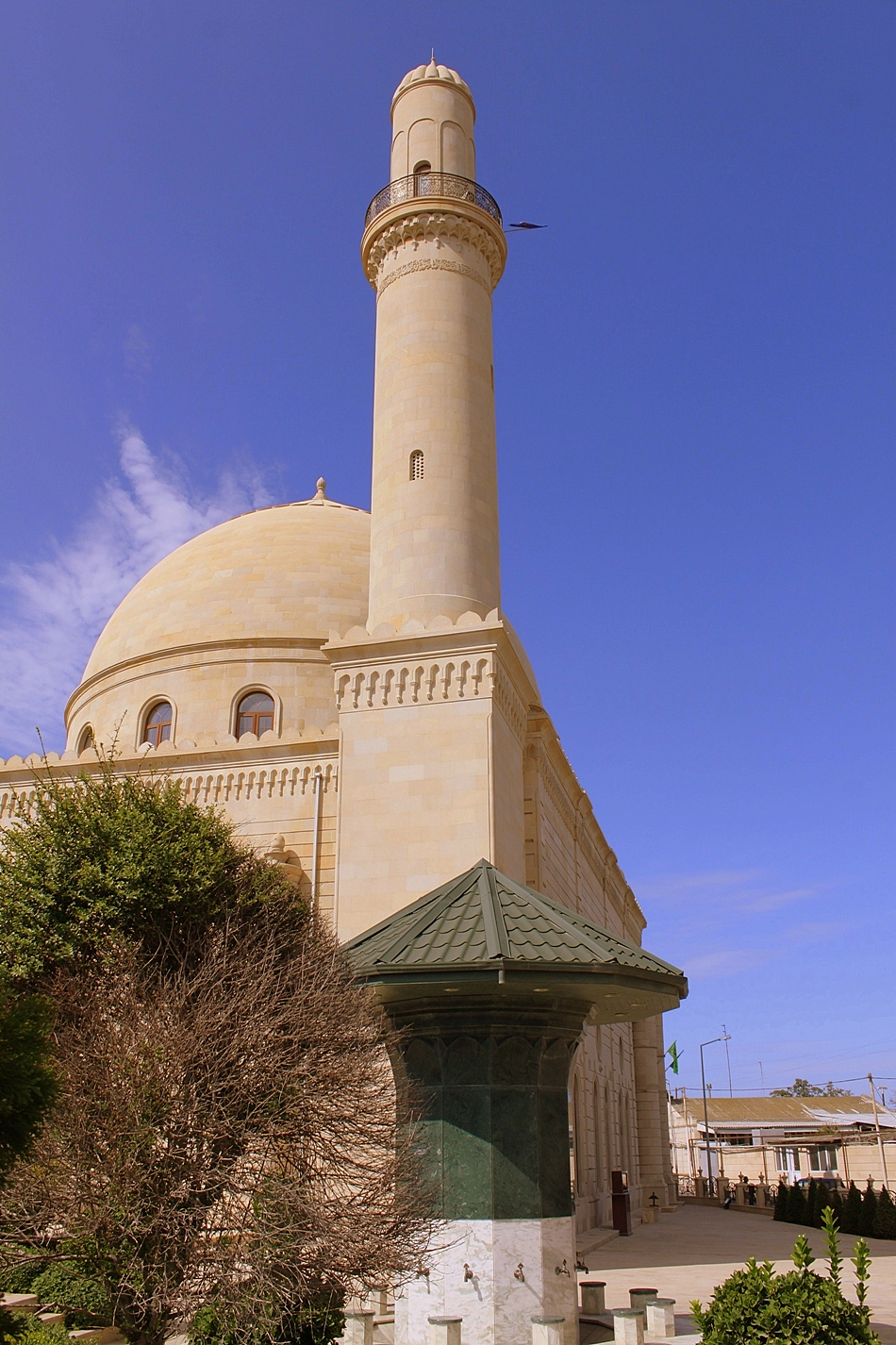
- Interactive map of Buzovna Juma Mosque
- 40°31′02″N 50°06′48″E
- Location: Buzovna, Akhundov Street, 103

History
- Built: 1896

Site notes
- Area: Baku, Azerbaijan

The Buzovna Juma Mosque, also known as the Ali ibn Abi Talib Mosque, is a mosque and a historical-architectural monument located in the Buzovna settlement of the Khazar raion of Baku, Azerbaijan.

By decision No. 132 of the Cabinet of Ministers of the Republic of Azerbaijan dated August 2, 2001, the mosque was included in the list of immovable historical and cultural monuments of local significance.

== History ==
=== Early years ===
The Buzovna Juma Mosque is located in the Buzovna settlement. Construction began in 1896, but the building remained unfinished in 1900. In 1918, construction work resumed, though it was never fully completed.

After the Soviet occupation, an official campaign against religion began in Azerbaijan in 1928. Many mosques, churches, and synagogues were handed over to clubs to be used for educational and cultural purposes. While there were about 3,000 mosques in Azerbaijan in 1917, this number decreased to 1,700 by 1927, 1,369 by 1928, and only 17 by 1933. During this period, the Buzovna Juma Mosque also ceased functioning, and its building was used as a warehouse and shop.

=== After independence ===
After Azerbaijan regained its independence, the mosque was included in the list of immovable historical and cultural monuments of local significance by Decision No. 132 of the Cabinet of Ministers of the Republic of Azerbaijan dated August 2, 2001.

In February 2007, restoration work on the mosque began. Following the restoration, the mosque was officially reopened on December 19, 2009. In addition to the 500-square-meter mosque, auxiliary and administrative buildings, ablution areas for men and women, and a minaret were constructed on the site. The first floor of the mosque was designated for men’s prayers, while the second floor was arranged for women.

The mosque, covering an area of 500 square meters, was built from limestone and its façade is decorated with stone inscriptions in Arabic script. The mosque’s total height is 28 meters, and its dome reaches 12 meters. It can accommodate up to 500 worshippers at the same time.

A registered religious community currently operates within the mosque.

== Sources ==
- Azərbaycan Respublikası Məscidlərinin Ensiklopediyası (in Azerbaijani). Baku: Beynəlxalq Əlhuda. 2001. p. 310.
- Yunusov, Arif (2004). Azərbaycanda İslam (PDF) (in Azerbaijani). Baku: Zaman. p. 364. Archived (PDF) from the original on 2023-07-05.
