= Arran, Syria =

Arran
- Location of Arran in Syria
- Coordinates: 36°17′54.16″N 37°32′43.64″E
- Country: Syria
- Governorate: Aleppo
- District: al-Bab
- Subdistrict: Tedef

Population (2004)
  - Total: 4,135
- Time zone: UTC+2 (EET)
  - Summer (DST): UTC+3 (EEST)

Arran is a village in al-Bab District in northern Aleppo Governorate, northwestern Syria.
