= Ovdan (Balakhani) =

14th century structure in Azerbaijan

- Azerbaijani: Ovdan
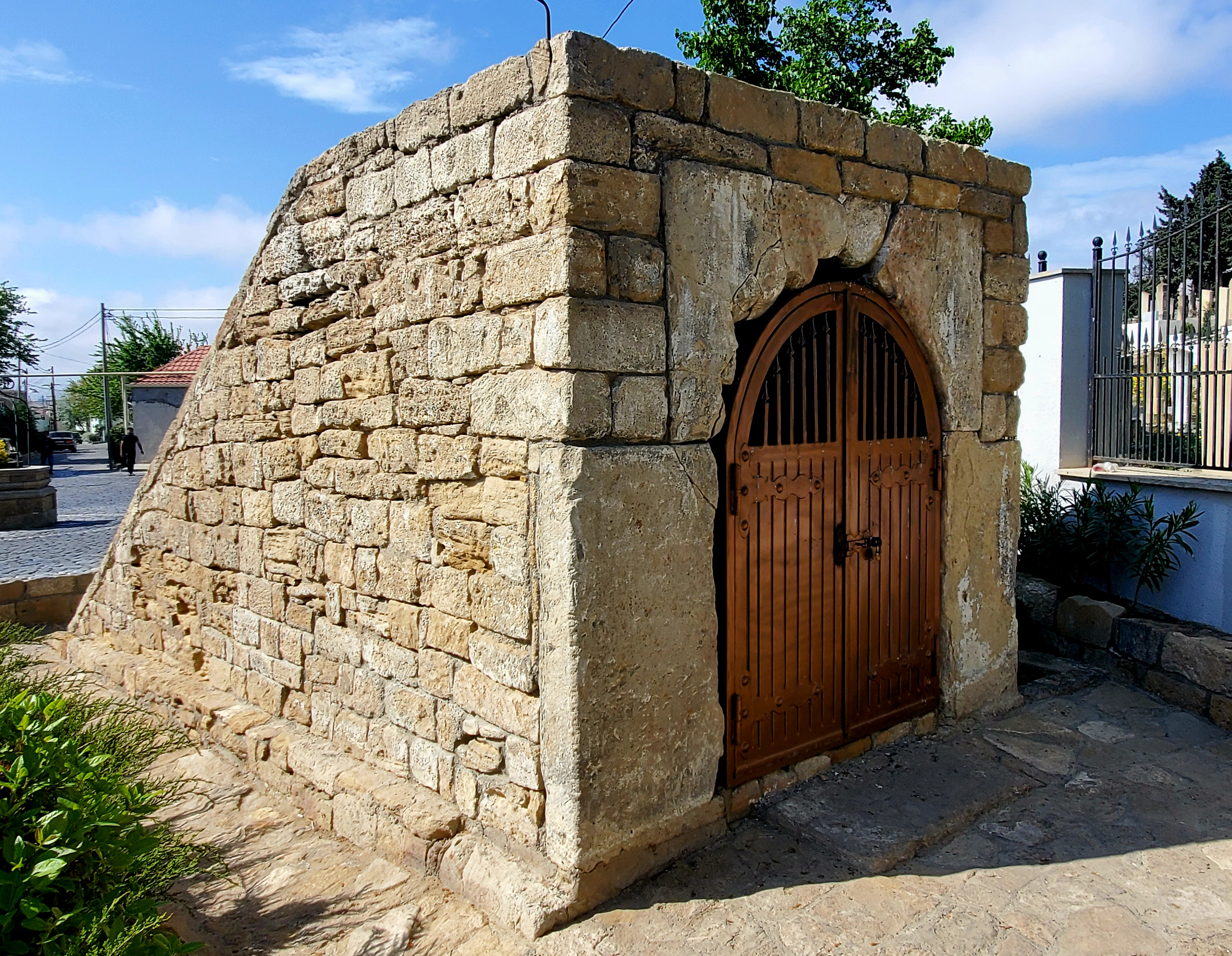

- Location within Azerbaijan

General information
- Location: Balakhany, Abdulvahab Salamzada str, Baku, Azerbaijan
- Coordinates: 40.463719°N 49.920087°E
- Completed: XIV century
- Client: Emir Khaja Zeynaddin

The structure, Ovdan, was built in the 14th century in the Balakhani settlement in modern-day Azerbaijan by order of Shirvanshah Emir Khaja Zeynaddin.

== History ==
The structure of the stairs is as high as that in the palace of the Shirvanshahs. It is believed that after the construction of the Sand Bath, the first periods were supplied with water taken from Ovdan.

A very small part of Ovdan is on the ground, the main part is under the ground. 40 underground stairsteps that are carved out of bedrock go straight down to the water source, which is at a distance of 15 meters from the entrance. Since the underground part of the building is in the form of an arched corridor, the possibility of collapse is non-existent due to the pressure of the weight of the soil layer on it. In the past, Balakhani used to get drinkable water from this source.

Ovdan was used by the population until the occupation in April 1920. In the following periods, it was neglected. In 2019, restoration of the monument was started.

== Gallery ==
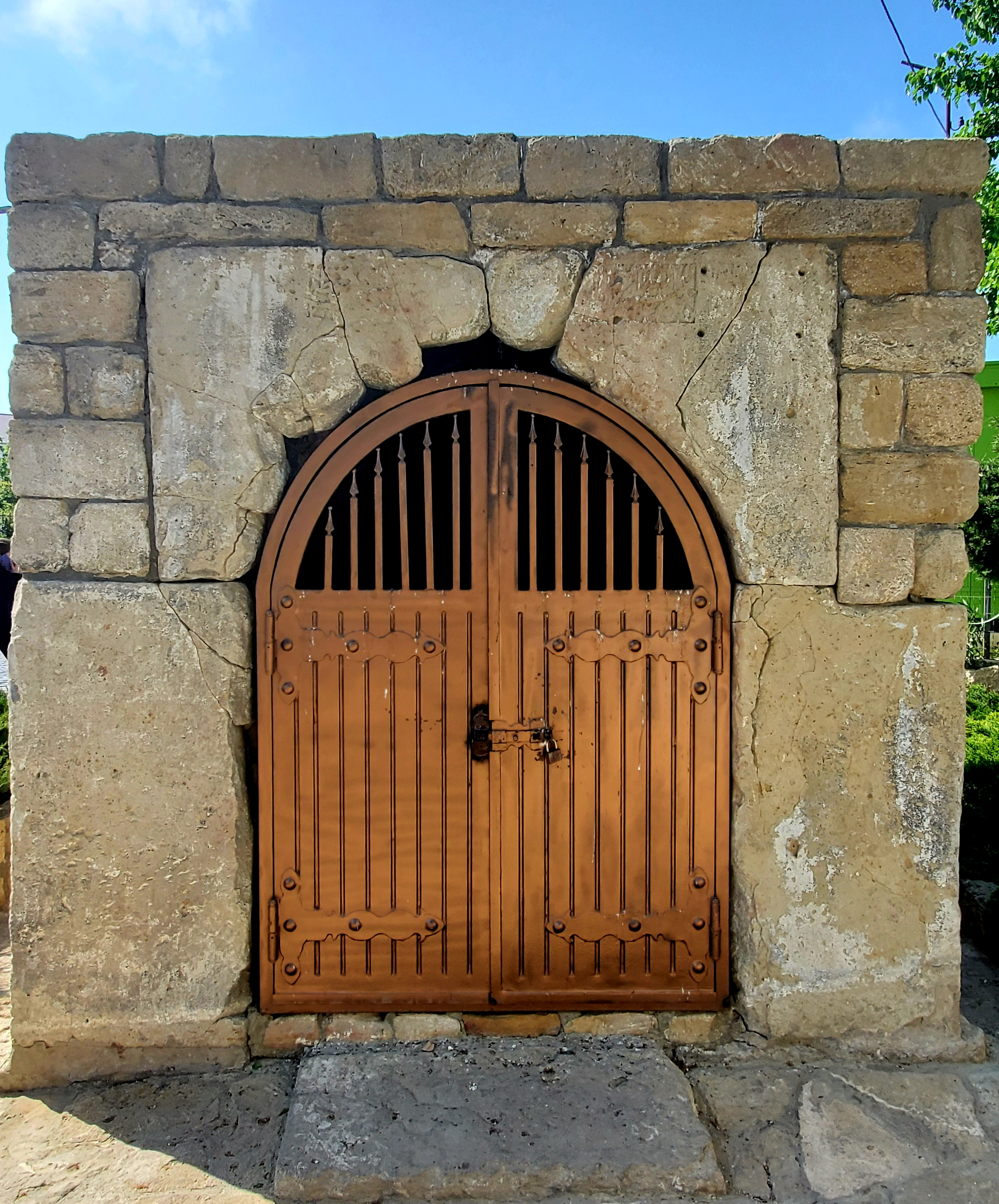

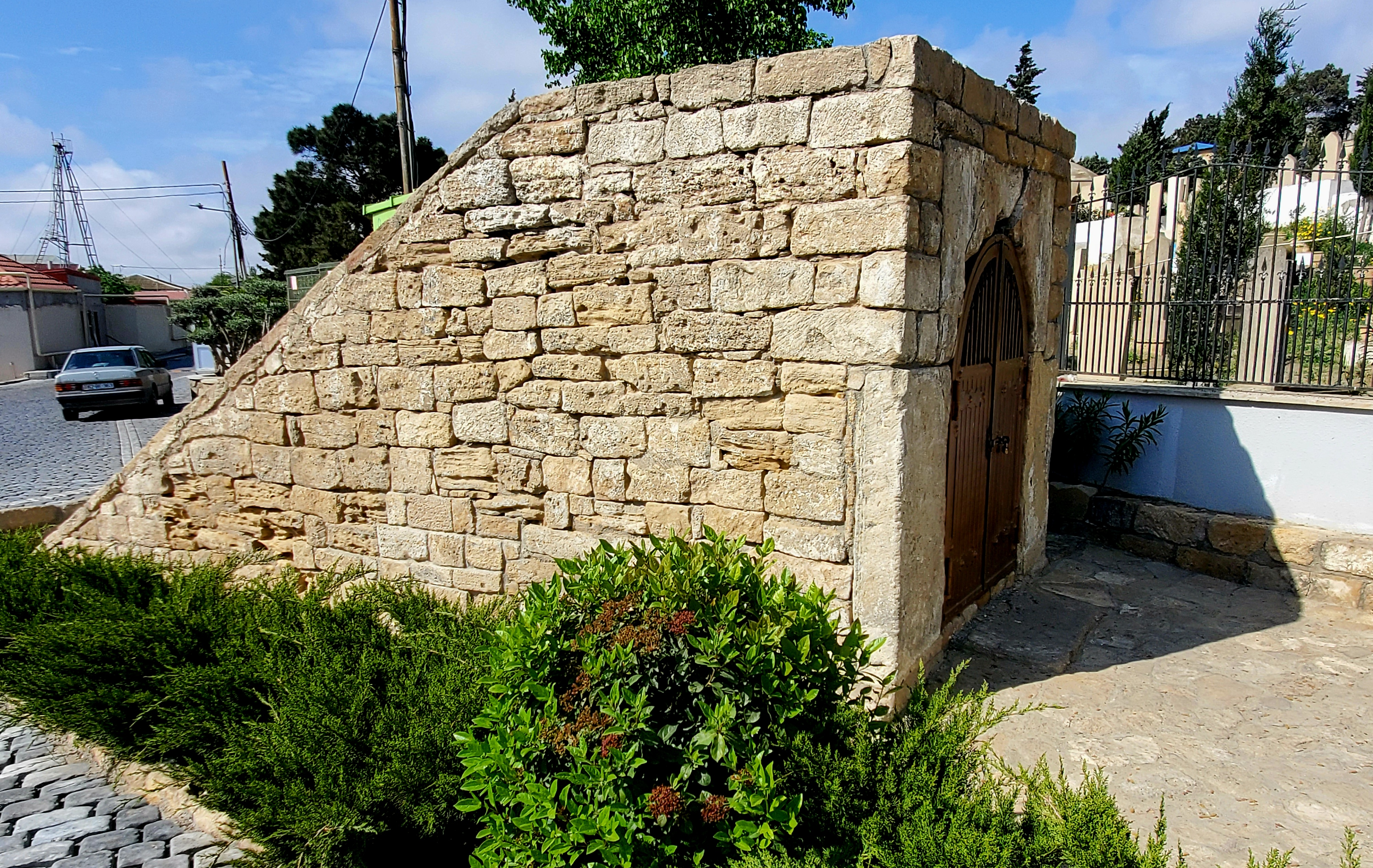

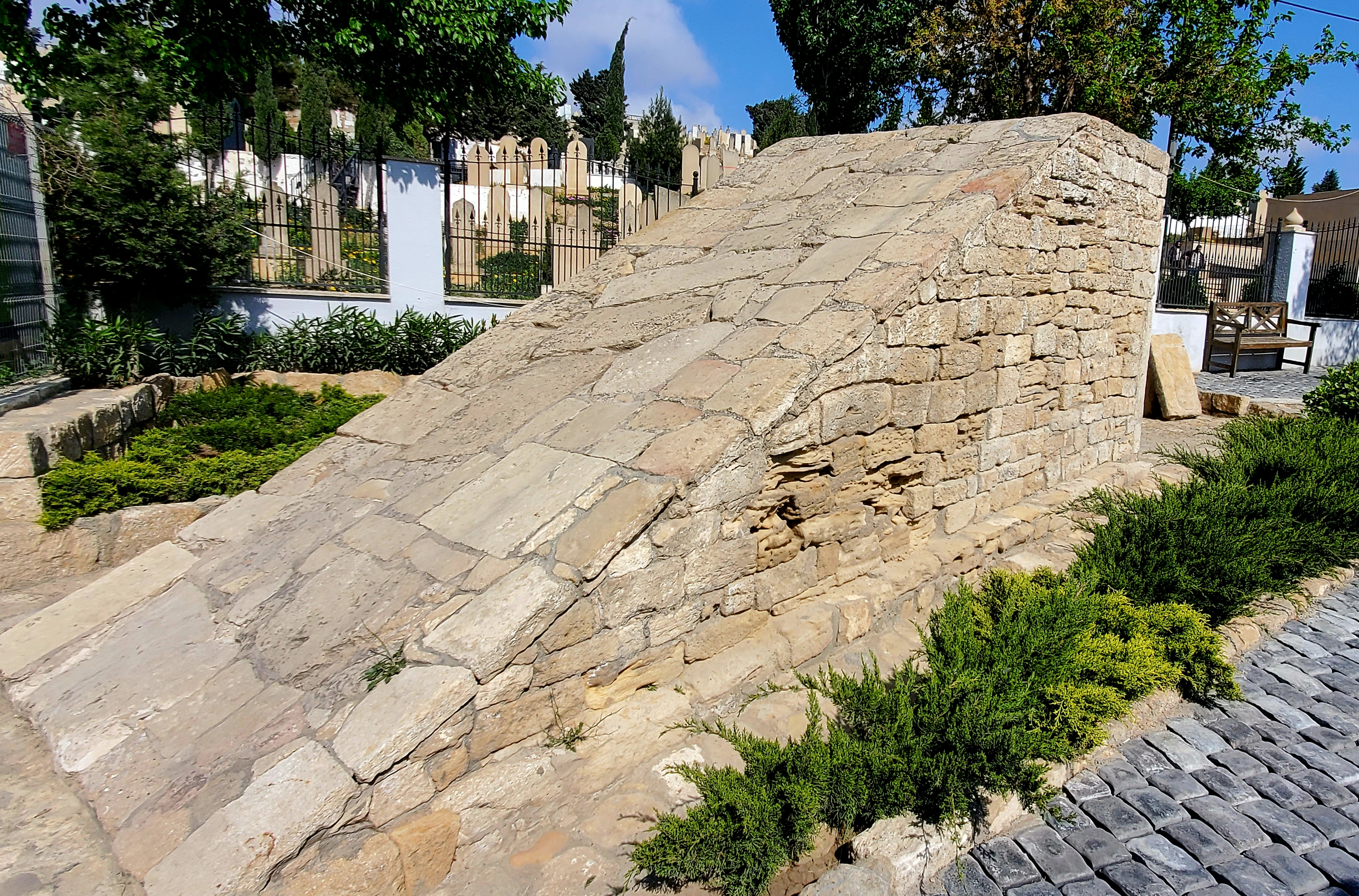

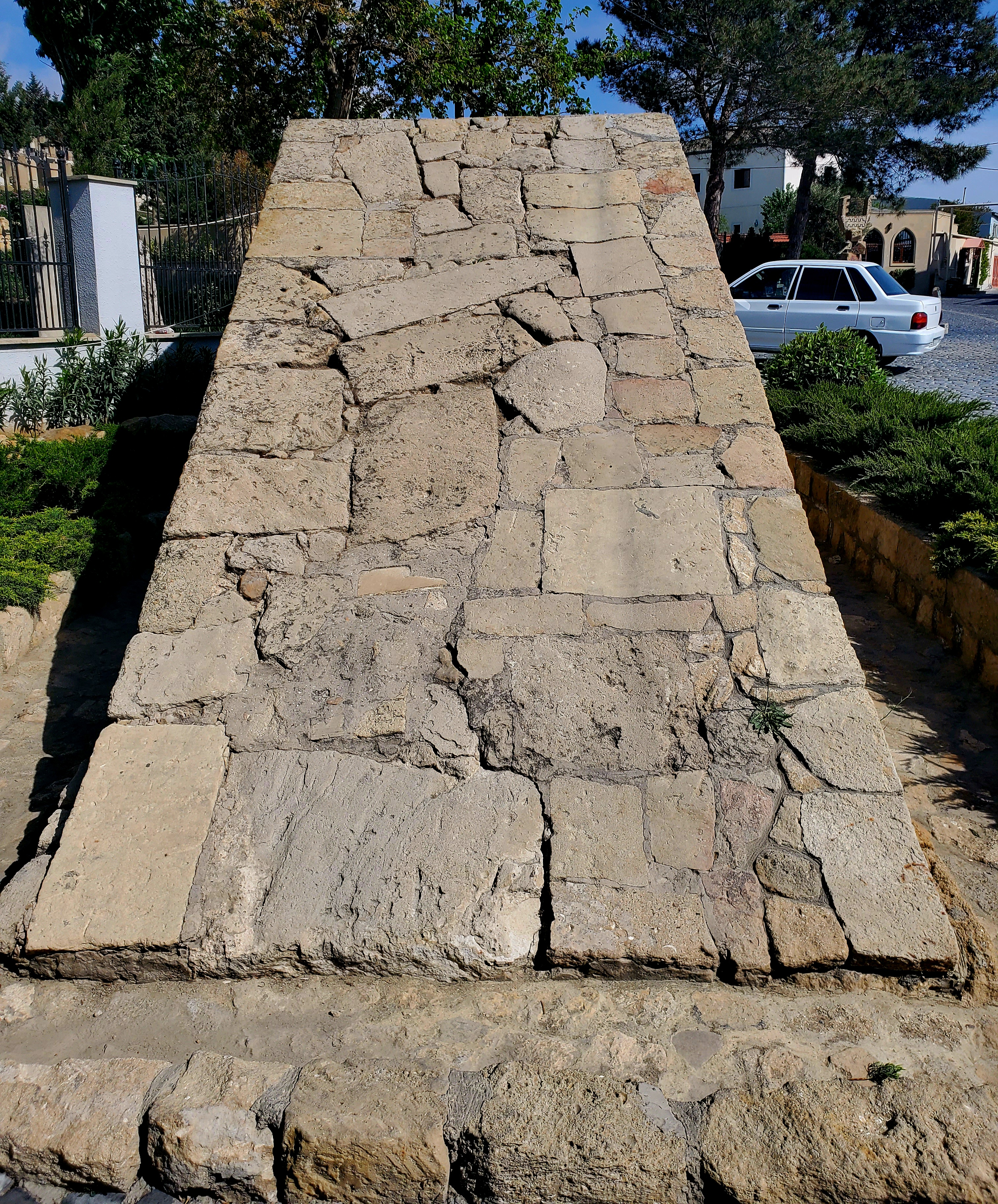

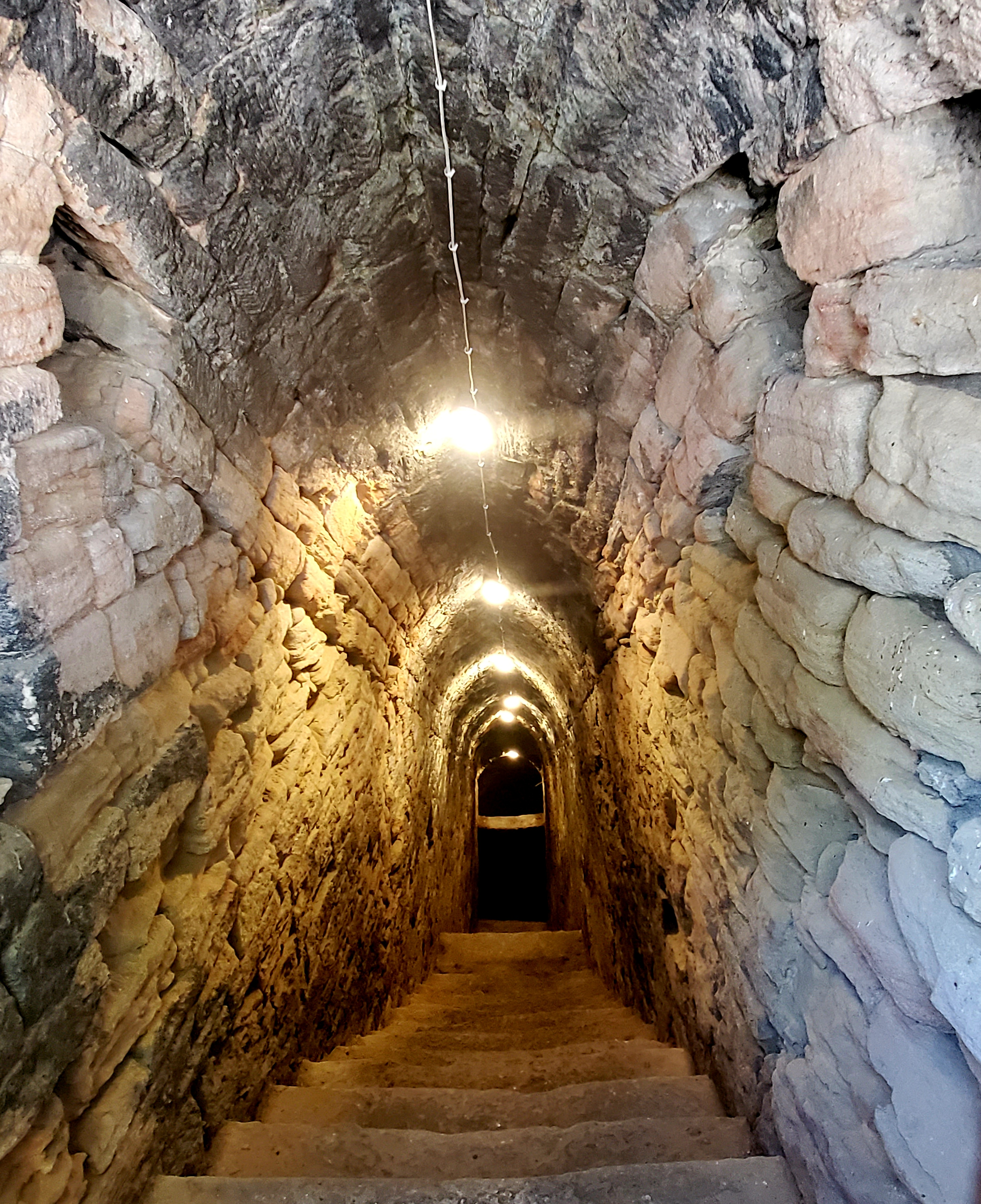

== See also ==
- Haji Shahla Mosque
- Shakiragha Mausoleum
- Shirvanshah's Palace Mausoleum
