= LGBTQ rights in Azerbaijan =

- Location of Azerbaijan (green) in Europe (dark grey) – [Legend]
- Legal status: Legal since 2000
- Gender identity: No
- Military: No
- Discrimination protections: No

Family rights
- Recognition of relationships: No recognition of same-sex relationships
- Adoption: No

Lesbian, gay, bisexual, transgender, and queer (LGBTQ) people in Azerbaijan face significant challenges not experienced by non-LGBTQ residents. Same-sex sexual activity has been legal in Azerbaijan since 1 September 2000. Nonetheless, discrimination on the basis of sexual orientation and gender identity are not banned in the country and same-sex marriage is not recognized.

Homosexuality remains a taboo subject in the Azerbaijani society, as each year since 2015, ILGA-Europe has ranked Azerbaijan as the worst state (49 out of 49) in Europe for LGBTQIA+ rights protection, citing "a near total absence of legal protection" for LGBTQIA+ individuals. In September 2017, reports emerged that at least 100 members of Baku's LGBTQIA+ community were arrested, ostensibly as part of a crackdown on prostitution. Activists reported that these detainees were subject to beatings, interrogation, forced medical examinations, and blackmail.

LGBTQIA+ people face high rates of violence, harassment and discrimination.

== History and legality of same-sex sexual activity ==
Azerbaijani Progress Pride Flag

After declaring independence from the Russian Empire in 1918, the Azerbaijan Democratic Republic did not have laws against homosexuality. When Azerbaijan became a part of the Soviet Union in 1920, it was subject to rarely enforced Soviet laws criminalizing the practice of sex between men. Despite Vladimir Lenin having decriminalized homosexuality in Soviet Russia (inexplicitly; the Tsarist legal system was abolished, thus decriminalising sodomy), sexual intercourse between men (incorrectly termed pederasty in the laws, rather than the technically accurate term sodomy) became a criminal offence in 1923 in the Azerbaijan SSR, punishable by up to five years in prison for consenting adults, or up to eight years if it involved force or threat.

Azerbaijan regained its independence in 1991, and in 2000 repealed the Soviet-era anti-sodomy law. A special edition of Azerbaijan, the official newspaper of the National Assembly, published on 28 May 2000, reported that the National Assembly had approved a new criminal code, and that President Heydar Aliyev had signed a decree making it law beginning on 1 September 2000. Repeal of Article 121 was a requirement for Azerbaijan to join the Council of Europe, which Azerbaijan did on 25 January 2001.

The age of consent is now equal for both heterosexual and homosexual sex, at 16 years of age.

Azerbaijan's anti-LGBTQIA+ discrimination has stirred controversy in relation to international events hosted by Azerbaijan, with critics arguing that Azerbaijan should not be allowed to host international events due to its discrimination against LGBTQIA+ people.

== Recognition of same-sex relationships ==
Same-sex couples are not legally recognised. Same-sex marriage and civil unions are not recognized or performed.

== Adoption and family planning ==
Same-sex couples are not allowed to adopt children in Azerbaijan.

== Military service ==
Azerbaijan implements mandatory military conscription for all able-bodied men between the ages of 18 and 35 to enlist in the military. There is no specific law that prohibits lesbians, gays and bisexuals from serving in the Azerbaijani military, however they could be unfit to serve under the Articles 18/b and 17/b of the Regulation on Military Medical Examinations. Article 18, paragraph b of the Regulation on Military Medical Examinations, states a person is considered unfit or partially unfit for military service on the basis of personality disorders. In addition to Article 18/b, LGBTQIA+ enlistees are also categorized under Article 17/b, which indicates reactive psychoses and neurotic disorders.

Queer conscripts often conceal their sexual orientation to avoid harassment, especially under the informal system of dedovshchina (military hazing). Ani Paitjan and Naila Dadash-Zadeh reported in 2020 that official exemptions are available, but coming out to authorities often entails outing oneself to family and community—an outcome many find too dangerous. Homophobic slurs and psychological abuse are common, and survivors describe long-lasting effects on their sense of trust and safety. Dr Ramil Zamanov has also published an academic article on queer military experiences about Azerbaijan in the Journal of Critical Military Studies. Article is entitled: 'State violence and queer identities: experiences from the Azerbaijani military'.

== Gender identity and expression ==
Azerbaijan possesses no legislation enabling transgender people to legally change their gender on official documents. However, transgender people are allowed to change their name so that it matches their gender identity.

== Blood donation ==
It is unknown whether men who have sex with men are de facto permitted to donate blood. By law, no groups are excluded from blood donation apart from HIV/AIDS infected persons.

== Living conditions ==
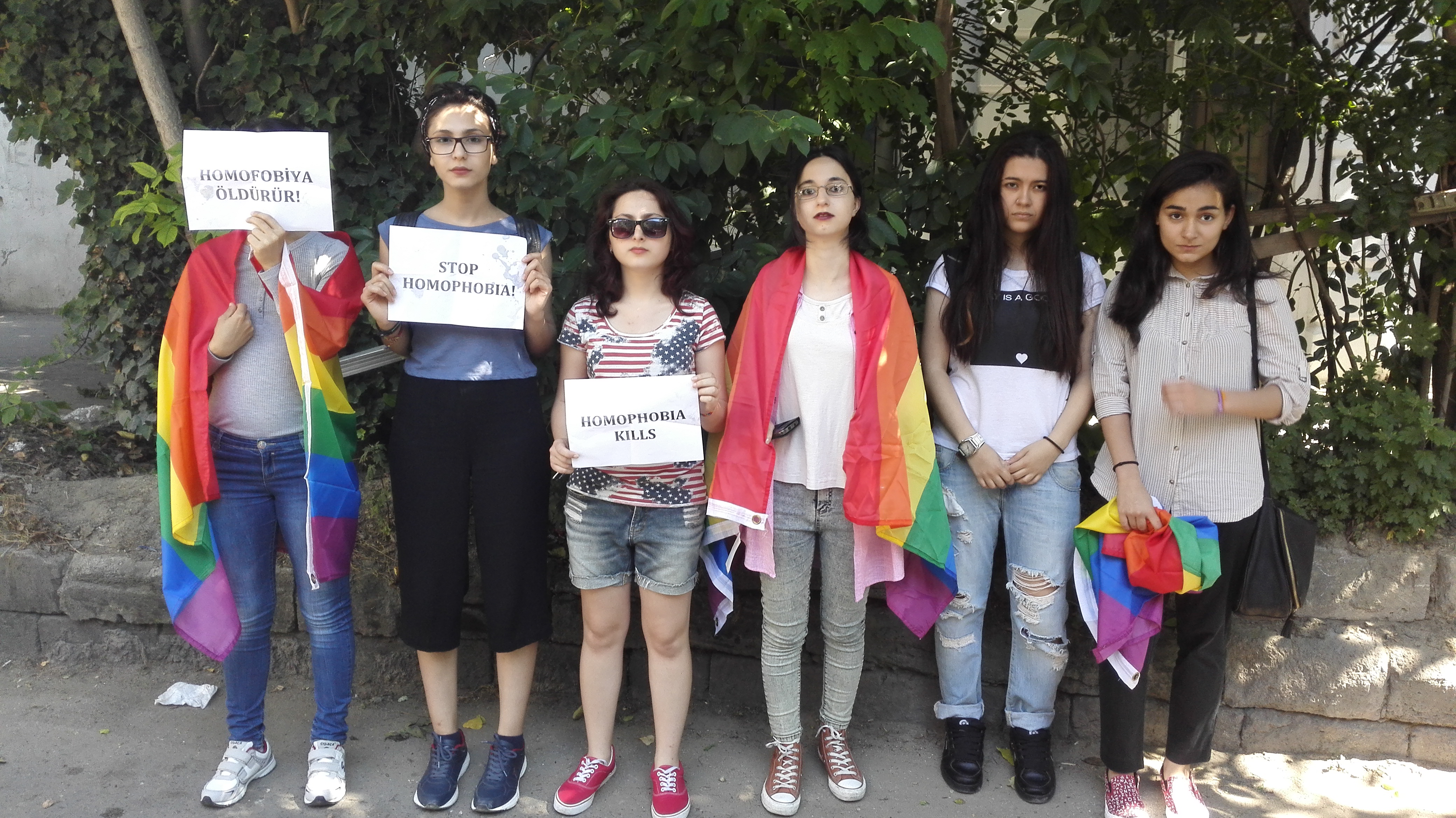
Young people commemorate victims of the Orlando nightclub shooting in front of the U.S. Embassy in Baku on 14 June 2016.

Azerbaijan is largely a secular country with one of the least practicing majority-Muslim populations. The reason behind homophobia is mostly due to the lack of knowledge about it, as well as due to the "old traditions". Families of homosexuals often cannot come to terms with the latter's sexuality, especially in rural areas. Coming out often results in violence or ostracism by the family patriarchs or forced heterosexual marriage.

There were rumours of an LGBTQIA+ parade being organized in time for the Eurovision Song Contest 2012, which was hosted by Azerbaijan. This caused disagreement in society due to homophobic views, but it did gain support from Azerbaijani human rights activists. The contest's presence in Azerbaijan also caused diplomatic tensions with neighbouring Iran. Iranian clerics Ayatollah Mohammad Mojtahed Shabestari and Ayatollah Ja'far Sobhani condemned Azerbaijan for "anti-Islamic behaviour", claiming that Azerbaijan was going to host a gay parade. This led to protests in front of the Iranian embassy in Baku, where protesters carried slogans mocking the Iranian leaders. Ali Hasanov, head of the public and political issues department in the Azerbaijani President's administration, said that gay parade claims were untrue, and warned Iran not to meddle in Azerbaijan's internal affairs. In response, Iran recalled its ambassador from Baku, while Azerbaijan demanded a formal apology from Iran for its statements in connection with Baku's hosting of the Eurovision Song Contest, and later also recalled its ambassador from Tehran.

LGBTQIA+ people have gained more visibility in recent years, through various interviews, social media posts and films. For Pride Month in 2019, several Azerbaijani celebrities shared social media posts supporting LGBTQIA+ rights, including singer Röya, stylist Anar Aghakishiyev and 2011 Eurovision winner Eldar Gasimov.

Same-sex sexual activity has been legal in Azerbaijan since 1 September 2000. Nonetheless, discrimination on the basis of sexual orientation and gender identity is not banned in the country and same-sex marriage is not recognized.

=== Society ===
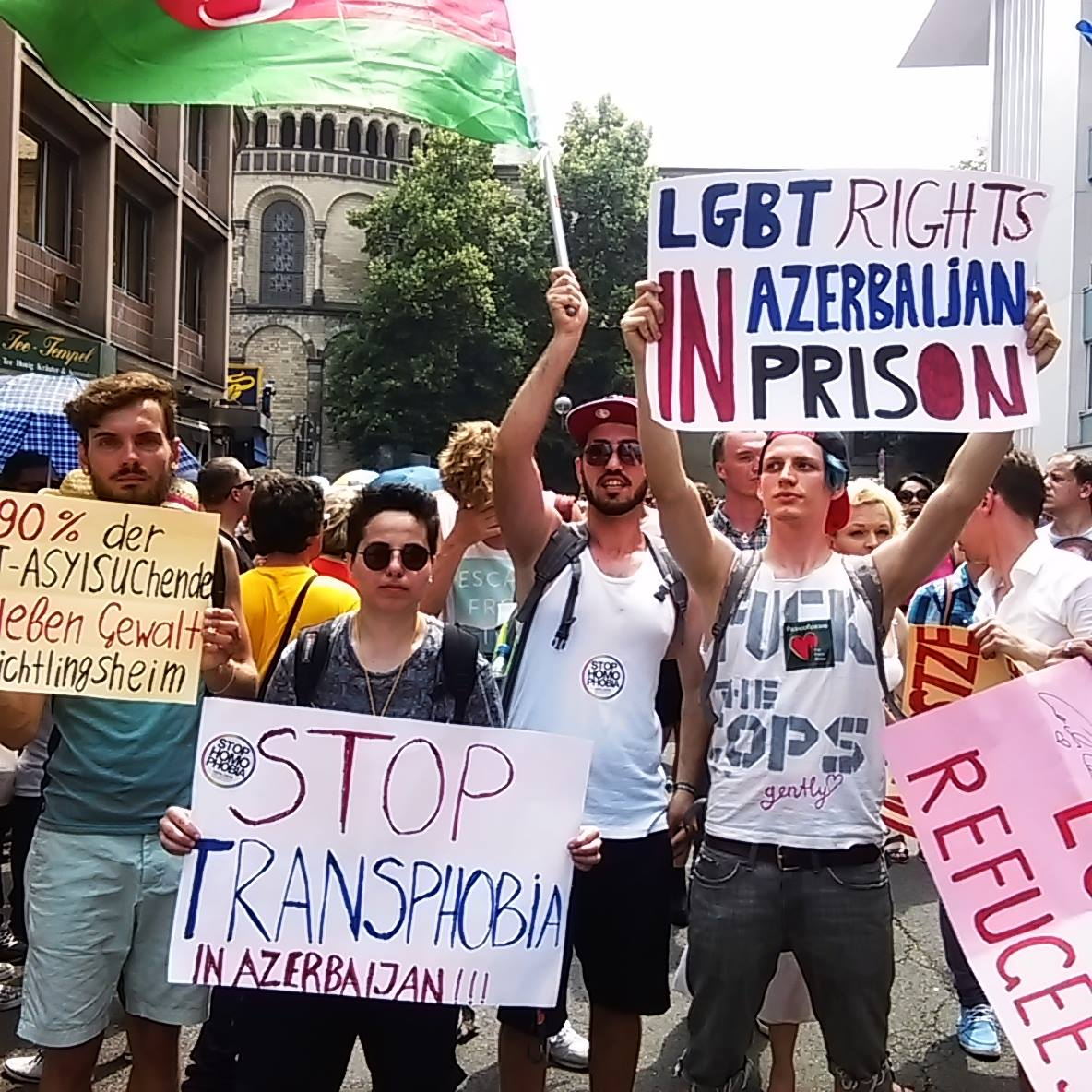
Activists protest LGBT rights violations in Azerbaijan during a 2015 rally in Germany.

As in most other post-Soviet era countries, Azerbaijan remains a place where homosexuality is an issue surrounded by confusion. There is hardly any objective or correct information on the psychological, sociological and legal aspects of homosexuality in Azerbaijan, with the result that the majority of the society simply does not know what homosexuality is.

"Coming out" as a gay, lesbian, bisexual or transgender person is therefore rare, and individual LGBTQ people are afraid of the consequences. Thus many lead double lives, with some feeling deeply ashamed about being gay. Those who are financially independent and living in Baku are able to lead a safe life as an LGBTQIA+ person, as long as they "practice" their homosexuality in their private sphere. There is a small LGBTQ movement, with three organizations advocating for LGBTQIA+ rights and protection.

Although homosexual acts between consenting male adults are officially decriminalized, reports about police abuses against gays, mainly male prostitutes, have persisted. While complaining of the violence against them, the victims preferred to remain anonymous fearing retaliation on the part of the police. In 2019, in A v. Azerbaijan, the European Court of Human Rights called out the state for its 2017 raids in which over 80 LGBTQ people were detained, many tortured and abused by police.

In April 2019, Elina Hajiyeva, a 14-year-old girl from Baku, attempted suicide once more due to homophobic bullying at her school. Although her mother had reported the bullying to the principal, Sevinj Abbasova, neither she nor other teachers took any action against it. After the attempted suicide, the principal kept Hajiyeva in her office for an hour during which she attempted to have the half-conscious Hajiyeva admit to suicidal tendencies and place the blame on family difficulties rather than on bullying issues at the school. She did not call an ambulance or allow others to do so. Hajiyeva died in hospital two days later. The school director, deputy director and school psychologist were dismissed from office. Only the principal was prosecuted on account of negligence resulting in death, and leaving someone in danger. On 24 October 2019, the principal was sentenced by the Sabail District Court of Baku to 2 years and 2.5 months of restriction of liberty, which means movement surveillance, only requiring her to be home at 9:00 PM. She was also ordered to pay 18,500 AZN ($10,882) of monetary compensation to the parents.

The case sparked a nationwide social media campaign against bullying. 2011 Eurovision winner Nigar Jamal posted a video on Instagram addressed to President Ilham Aliyev asking government officials to take action. The Ministry of Education launched an action plan against bullying on 13 May, envisaging a number of tasks to ensure a "healthy environment in general education institutions", to improve school and family relations and to protect students from abuse. A hotline was also established.

In May 2019, Azerbaijan Airlines fired three employees for releasing personal information of a transgender passenger on social media, including a picture of her passport. In June 2019, five transgender women were physically assaulted by a group of 15 men in Mardakan. Four of the attackers were arrested. In September 2019, a young gay man was beaten, raped and expelled from his village of Yolçubəyli because of his sexuality. He reported the violence to police. Photos of his rape surfaced online.

=== Media ===
The first news website for LGBTQIA+ people in Azerbaijan was launched by Ruslan Balukhin on 25 May 2011: gay.az.

The Azerbaijani Constitution guarantees freedom of expression for everyone by all forms of expressions. The Azerbaijan Press Council was founded in 2003. The council deals with complaints according to the Press Code of Conduct. It is unknown if the council has assessed complaints of harassment made by state-controlled media using homosexuality as a tool to harass and discredit critics of the government.

The media in Azerbaijan has been criticized for spreading fear and hate towards queer people, with the use of discriminatory language and the portrayal of queer individuals in a negative light. Queer people face discrimination in various aspects of life, and the media often becomes a tool for propaganda and disinformation, with politicians and officials using it to influence the public's perception of queer individuals. Vahid Aliyev, a co-founder of the Minority Azerbaijan news webpage, has criticised the media for their unprofessional manners and their impact on shaping public opinion.

Azerbaijan's human rights NGOs have been successful in raising awareness of the lives of Azeri LGBTQIA+ people.

The first LGBTQIA+ online magazine Minority Magazine was founded by Samad Ismayilov in December 2015. The magazine covers education, entertainment and current issues about LGBTQ people. The magazine started functioning as an NGO from August 2017.

=== Film ===
Samad Ismayilov, an LGBTQIA+ activist and the founder of Minority Magazine, made a documentary movie about a trans man from Azerbaijan named Sebastian. The film focuses on Sebastian's challenges, fears and dreams about the future. It was filmed in Ohio in the United States. The film made its debut in Baku on 25 November 2017, with the support of the Dutch embassy. About 80 people came to watch the movie and participate at LGBTQIA+ discussions after the film.

Deniz Miray, who is trans rights activist and film critic, shot her "Bədənimə Günəş" in 2022 by talking about the challenges of LGBTQI+ individuals in Azerbaijan.

=== Literature ===
In 2009, Ali Akbar wrote a scandalous book titled Artush and Zaur, which focused on homosexual love between an Armenian and Azerbaijani. According to Akbar, being an Armenian and being gay are major taboos in Azeri society.

In 2014, Azerbaijani writer Orkhan Bahadirsoy published a novel about the love of two young men, It is a sin to love you.

=== Suicide of İsa Şahmarlı ===
In January 2014, İsa Şahmarlı, the openly gay founder of AZAD LGBT, died of suicide by hanging himself with a rainbow flag. At the time of his death, Şahmarlı was unemployed, in debt, and estranged from his family who considered him "ill". Şahmarlı left a note on Facebook blaming society for his death. He was discovered soon afterward by friends.

Şahmarlı's suicide sparked an increase in LGBTQIA+ activism in Azerbaijan. The day of his death was marked as LGBTQIA+ Pride Day and was honored in 2015 with the release of several videos.

=== LGBTQI+ organizations ===
As of 2015, there are five known LGBTQ organizations in Azerbaijan:

- Gender and Development (Azerbaijani: Gender və Tərəqqi İctimai Birliyi), created in 2007 and carries out local projects in collaboration with the Ministry of Health.
- Nafas LGBTI Azerbaijan Alliance (Azerbaijani: Nəfəs LGBTİ Azərbaycan Alyansı), established in 2012. It has implemented several projects, including part of an international survey and regularly holds talks with the EU Delegation to Azerbaijan and other European embassies regarding the difficulties of LGBTQ people and their situation in Azerbaijan.
- AZAD LGBT, established in 2012 by İsa Şahmarlı. AZAD concentrates on education and better media representation in Azerbaijan. In its first year, it ran several projects including organizing LGBTQ movie nights in the capital of Baku. These movie nights were attended by a local psychologist who participated in Q&As after the films.
  In 2014, after Isa Shahmarli committed suicide, AZAD organized a series of photo and video projects. In 2015, AZAD launched a website providing free online LGBTQ education tools.
- Q-Collective
- Gender Resource Center () (Azerbaijani: Gender Resurs Mərkəzi), established in 2020 is a queer-feminist platform. The centre was established in Azerbaijan in response to the problem of lack of safe space and resources for people of different genders and sexual orientations.

Other online campaigns or magazines also exist.

- Gay.az, the first information portal for LGBTQ people in Azerbaijan
- Love Is Love, an online photo campaign designed to provide support to the LGBTQ community in Azerbaijan.
- Reng, in remembrance of Isa's birthday, including illustrated versions of several of Isa's writings
- Minority Magazine, which covers education, entertainment and current issues about LGBTQ people

== Human rights reports ==
=== 2017 United States Department of State report ===
In 2017, the United States Department of State reported the following, concerning the status of LGBTQ rights in Azerbaijan:

- "The most significant human rights issues included unlawful or arbitrary killing; torture; harsh and sometimes life-threatening prison conditions; arbitrary arrest; lack of judicial independence; political prisoners; criminalization of libel; physical attacks on journalists, arbitrary interference with privacy; interference in the freedoms of expression, assembly, and association through intimidation, incarceration on questionable charges, and harsh physical abuse of selected activists, journalists, and secular and religious opposition figures, and blocking of websites; restrictions on freedom of movement for a growing number of journalists and activists; severe restrictions on political participation; and systemic government corruption; and police detention and torture, of lesbian, gay, bisexual, transgender, and intersex (LGBTI) individuals; and worst forms of child labor, which the government made minimal efforts to eliminate."
- Torture and Other Cruel, Inhuman, or Degrading Treatment or Punishment
  "For example, lesbian, gay, bisexual, transgender, and intersex (LGBTI) individuals detained in September stated police threatened them with rape, and in some cases raped them with truncheons. Most did not publicize such threats."
- Acts of Violence, Discrimination, and Other Abuses Based on Sexual Orientation and Gender Identity
  "Antidiscrimination laws exist but do not specifically cover lesbian, gay, bisexual, transgender, and intersex (LGBTI) individuals.
  In October media and human rights lawyers reported that since mid-September police had arrested and tortured 83 men presumed to be gay or bisexual as well as transgender women. Once in custody, police beat the detainees and subjected them to electric shocks to obtain bribes and information about other gay men (see section 1.c.). By 3 October, many of the detainees had been released, many after being sentenced to 20-45 days in jail, fined up to 200 manat ($117), or both. On 2 October, the Ministry of Internal Affairs and the Office of the Prosecutor General issued a joint statement that denied the arrests were based on gender identity or sexual orientation.
  A local NGO reported there were numerous incidents of police brutality against individuals based on sexual orientation and noted that authorities did not investigate or punish those responsible. There were also reports of family-based violence against LGBTI individuals, hate speech against LGBTI persons, and hostile Facebook postings on personal online accounts. Activists reported that LGBTI individuals were regularly fired by employers if their sexual orientation/gender identity became known. One individual reported the military did not allow LGBTI individuals to serve and granted them deferment from conscription on the grounds of mental illness.
  LGBTI individuals generally refused to file formal complaints of discrimination or mistreatment with law enforcement bodies due to fear of social stigma or retaliation. Activists reported police indifference to investigating crimes committed against members of the LGBTI community."
- Discrimination with Respect to Employment and Occupation
  "Discrimination in employment and occupation also occurred with respect to sexual orientation. LGBTI individuals reported employers found other reasons to dismiss them because they could not legally dismiss someone because of their sexual orientation."

== Summary table ==
Same-sex sexual activity legal	Yes (Since 2000)
Equal age of consent (16)	Yes (Since 2000)
Anti-discrimination laws in employment only	Yes
Anti-discrimination laws in the provision of goods and services	No
Anti-discrimination laws in education	No
Anti-discrimination laws in all other areas (incl. indirect discrimination, hate speech)	No
Hate crime laws include sexual orientation and gender identity	No
Same-sex marriages	No
Recognition of same-sex couples	No
Stepchild adoption by same-sex couples	No
Joint adoption by same-sex couples	No
Single LGBTQ people allowed to adopt	Yes
Conversion therapy banned	No
Lesbians, gays and bisexuals allowed to serve openly in the military	No
Right to change legal gender	No (Transgender people can change their name but not their legal gender)
Access to IVF for lesbians	No
Commercial surrogacy for gay male couples	No
MSMs allowed to donate blood	Yes
Homosexuality declassified as an illness	No

== See also ==
- Human rights in Azerbaijan
- LGBT rights in Asia
- LGBT rights in Europe
