= Murder of Avaz Hafizli =

2022 murder in Baku, Azerbaijan

- Location: Balakhani, Sabunchu raion, Baku, Azerbaijan
- Date: February 22, 2022; 16:00
- Weapon: Knife
- Deaths: 1 person
- Perpetrator: Emrulla Gulaliyev
- Motive: homophobia
- Convicted: Emrulla Gulaliyev

Azerbaijani journalist, blogger, and member of the LGBT community, Avaz Hafizli (Azerbaijani: Əvəz Hafizli), was murdered on February 22, 2022, in the courtyard of the apartment where he lived in Baku. Hafizli's cousin Amrulla Gulaliyev committed the crime.

== Background ==
Avaz Hafizli worked as a reporter and covered a number of issues, including LGBT rights. He participated in rallies against the law on media adopted in Azerbaijan, organized protests demanding the government to end discrimination against LGBT citizens, and raised the rainbow flag in front of the presidential administration. An Azerbaijani activist who worked with Hafizli until he moved to the United Kingdom, who did not disclose his name, told "PinkNews" that Hafizli was also a "victim of police violence". In addition, Hafizli chained himself to a fence near the General Prosecutor's Office in 2021 to protest against the lack of action against threats against the gay community. He was always pressured by his family and relatives because of his sexual orientation. For this reason, he rented a house. Starting from July 2021, Azerbaijani blogger Sevinj Huseynova regularly made live broadcasts and posts targeting the country's LGBT community on her Instagram account, called on the community to commit violence and murder against trans people and gays, and threatened the community with death. Avaz claimed that after Huseynova's speeches, he was threatened by family members. On September 5, he complained about the actions of Sevinj Huseynova at the police station, and also stated on his social network account that Sevinj Huseynova will be guilty of every incident that happens to his. Hafizli repeatedly stated that his life was in danger and held actions alone to attract the attention of law enforcement agencies.

== Murder ==
On February 22, 2022, Gulaliyev went to the shop where another cousin worked in Balakhani and asked him if anyone was at home, and learned that Hafizli was alone at home. After that, he took the knife and went to the house where Hafizli was staying, called him to the yard and threw him on the ground, injuring his throat. Gulaliyev then killed Hafizli with several knives from different directions of his body. Then he went to the police and surrendered.

According to "Star Observer" publication, homophobic treatment was registered against him even after the incident. After his death, Hafizli's corpse was wrapped in a dirty carpet, and the police officers and doctors who came to the scene refused to touch Hafizli's corpse or carry it. For this reason, his friends had to take Hafizli's body to the morgue. According to the Azerbaijani law enforcement agencies, Gulaliyev "was in a drunken state when he committed the crime".

== Trial ==
On July 29, 2022, Amrulla Gulaliyev was sentenced at the Baku Serious Crimes Court. According to the verdict, Amrulla Gulaliyev was found guilty under Article 120.1 (intentional murder) of the Criminal Code of Azerbaijan and was sentenced to 9 years and 6 months in prison.

== Reactions ==
The death of Avaz Hafizli caused public resonance in Azerbaijan. Supporters of LGBT rights commemorated Hafizli on social media and complained about the lack of action against violence against the gay community. In addition, the US Embassy in Azerbaijan expressed its condolences to Hafizli's family and relatives.

In May 2022, a group of deputies of the Parliamentary Assembly of the Council of Europe took the initiative to adopt a resolution regarding threats to the lives and safety of journalists and human rights defenders in Azerbaijan. Deputies specifically referred to the murder in the house of Avaz Hafizli along with other events.
