= Shah Sefi's Caravanserai =

- Şah Səfi karvansarası
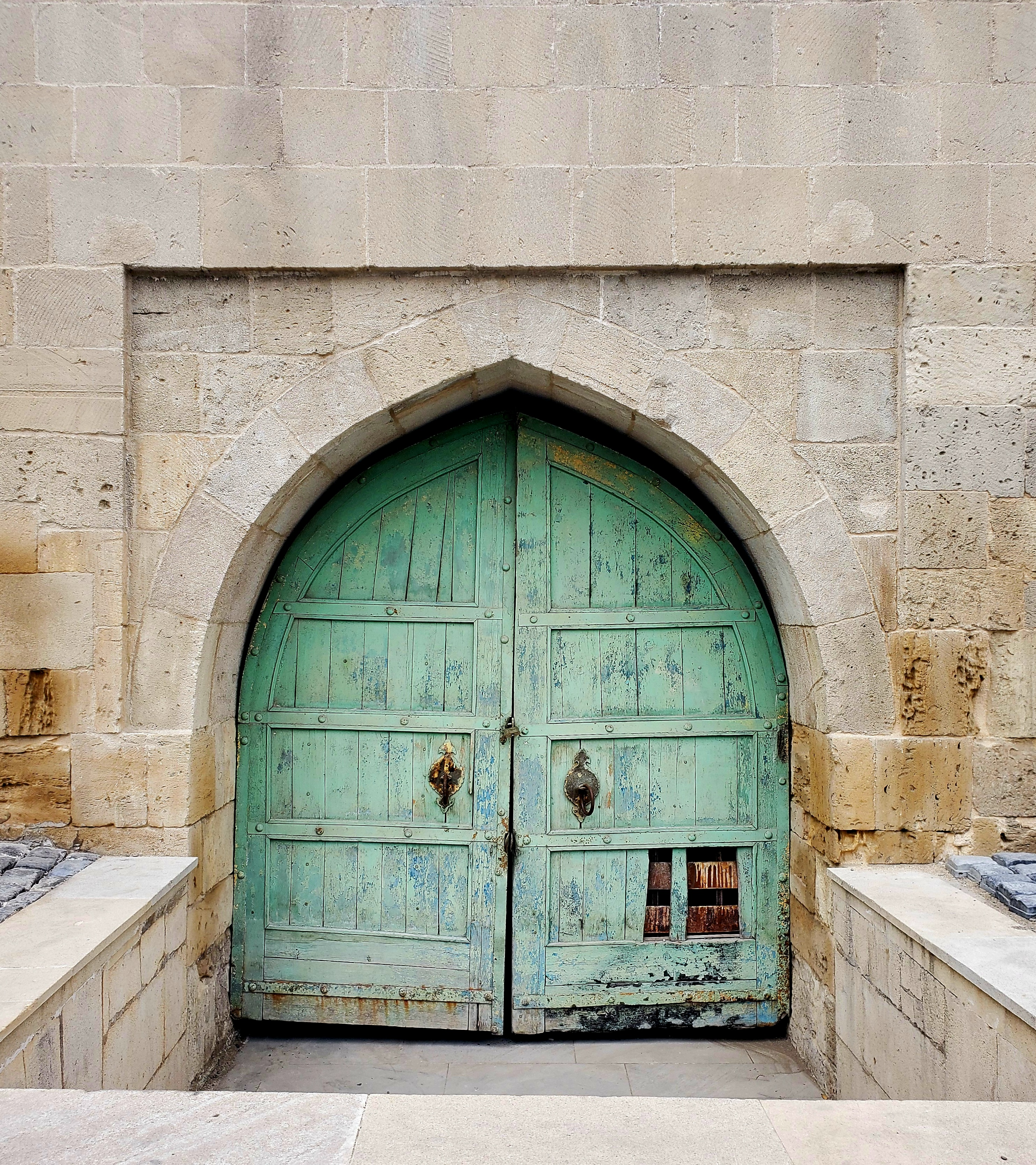
- Interactive map of the Shah Sefi's Caravanserai area

General information
- Type: Caravanserai
- Location: Balaxanı, Azerbaijan

Shah Sefi's Caravanserai is a historical and architectural monument of the 17th century located in the village of Balakhani. It was built in 1635-1636 by the master Burkhan and the sarkar Behbud at the order of the Safavid ruler Shah Sefi I.

Shah Sefi's caravanserai on the plan represent an elongated rectangle with an aspect ratio of approximately 1:3. The caravanserai's entrance is oriented to the north-east.

== History ==
Shah Sefi's caravanserai was built in 1635-1636 by the master Burkhan and the sarkar Behbud at the order of the Safavid ruler Shah Sefi I. The caravanserai, called by the local population the Palace of Haja Ruhulla, is located in the centre of the village. During the years of the Soviet occupation, the caravanserai was used as a warehouse for a long time. In the first years of Azerbaijan's independence, a restaurant functioned there. Then, as a result of the village's residents' efforts, the premises of the caravanserai were cleared, and landscaping work was carried out around it.

There was a kitabe on the arched wooden door of this historical monument. Nowadays, it is no longer there, but the photographic negative is stored in the scientific archive of the Institute of History of the National Academy of Science of Azerbaijan under the name “Shah Sefi's Caravanserai” as the inventory No 68-14.

In 1968–1969, restoration works were carried out there.

== Architectural features ==
Shah Sefi's Caravanserai on its plan represents an elongated rectangle with an aspect ratio of approximately 1:3. The caravanserai has its entrance oriented to the north-east. The elongated room inside is divided into three parts by the shoulder blades with a significant protrusion. The blades from one wall of the room of a lancet arch pass to the opposite side by dividing the space into three parts eliminating its unpleasant corridor shape. At the same time, they strengthen the wall and the edifice's ceilings, working like an ogival vault. There are blind towers in the corners of the caravanserai (except for the main facade) and in the middle of the side facades. All of them are of an equal diameter tapering upwards.

In the centre of the main facade, above the entrance's framing of the lancet arch, an inscription was mounted. The inscription indicated the construction of a caravanserai with 1045 AH (1635/36).

== Literature ==
- Salamzadeh, Abdulvahab (1964). Архитектура Азербайджана XVI-XIX вв [Architecture of Azerbaijan from the 16th through 19th centuries] (in Russian). Baku: Академия наук Азербайджанской ССР.
