= İsa Şahmarlı =

Azerbaijani LGBT activist (1993–2014)

İsa Şahmarlı (ca. 1993 – January 22, 2014) was an Azerbaijani LGBT activist and chairman of the organization Azad LGBT. He was one of the first publicly known queer voices in Azerbaijan and became nationally known through his public suicide, which became a symbol of the fight against homophobic hatred in Azerbaijan.

== Life ==
Şahmarlı was born in the early 1990s in Azerbaijan. Little is known about his early life, but he reported in interviews that he experienced rejection from his family due to his sexual orientation. In a 2013 interview, he said: "I wish our society wasn’t so prejudiced. Before you hate, get informed about homosexuality. I want LGBT people to be brave… If you want it, you can make it."

Şahmarlı was the founder and chairman of the organization Azad LGBT, which advocated for the rights of sexual minorities in Azerbaijan. As one of the few openly gay activists in the country, he tried to make queer life visible and to resist social stigmatization. He appeared in media and was active on social networks to raise awareness about discrimination. Nevertheless, his work was severely hindered by Azerbaijan’s restrictive political and social environment.

On January 22, 2014, at the age of 20, Şahmarlı died by suicide in his apartment in Baku, hanging himself with a rainbow flag. Prior to his death, he posted a farewell letter on Facebook in which he held the homophobic society responsible for his death: "I am leaving you, may God bless you. This country and this world are not for me. I am going to be happy now. Tell my mother I loved her very much. I blame all of you for my death. This world is not colorful enough for my colors. Farewell."

== Reactions and legacy ==
News of his death provoked national and international reactions. Activists and friends who attended his funeral were physically attacked by family members. Şahmarlı’s grave was adorned with a rainbow flag, which was destroyed during the night. In the following days, activists took turns guarding the grave to prevent further desecration.

His death marked a turning point for the queer movement in Azerbaijan. Whereas previously it had focused on education and advocacy, it became more politically active afterward, with more activists coming out publicly. Since his death, January 22 is commemorated each year by queer groups as a day of resistance against homophobic hatred in Azerbaijan. Lala Mahmudova, who led the Azad LGBT organization after him, explained that his suicide drew attention to the country’s structural homophobia and gave many queer people courage: "His last words show that his death was a message. He committed suicide with the LGBTQIA+ flag – that was a sign."

== See also ==
- LGBT rights in Azerbaijan
