= Shakiragha Mausoleum =

Historical monument in Azerbaijan

Shakiragha mausoleum
- Azerbaijani: Şakirağa türbəsi
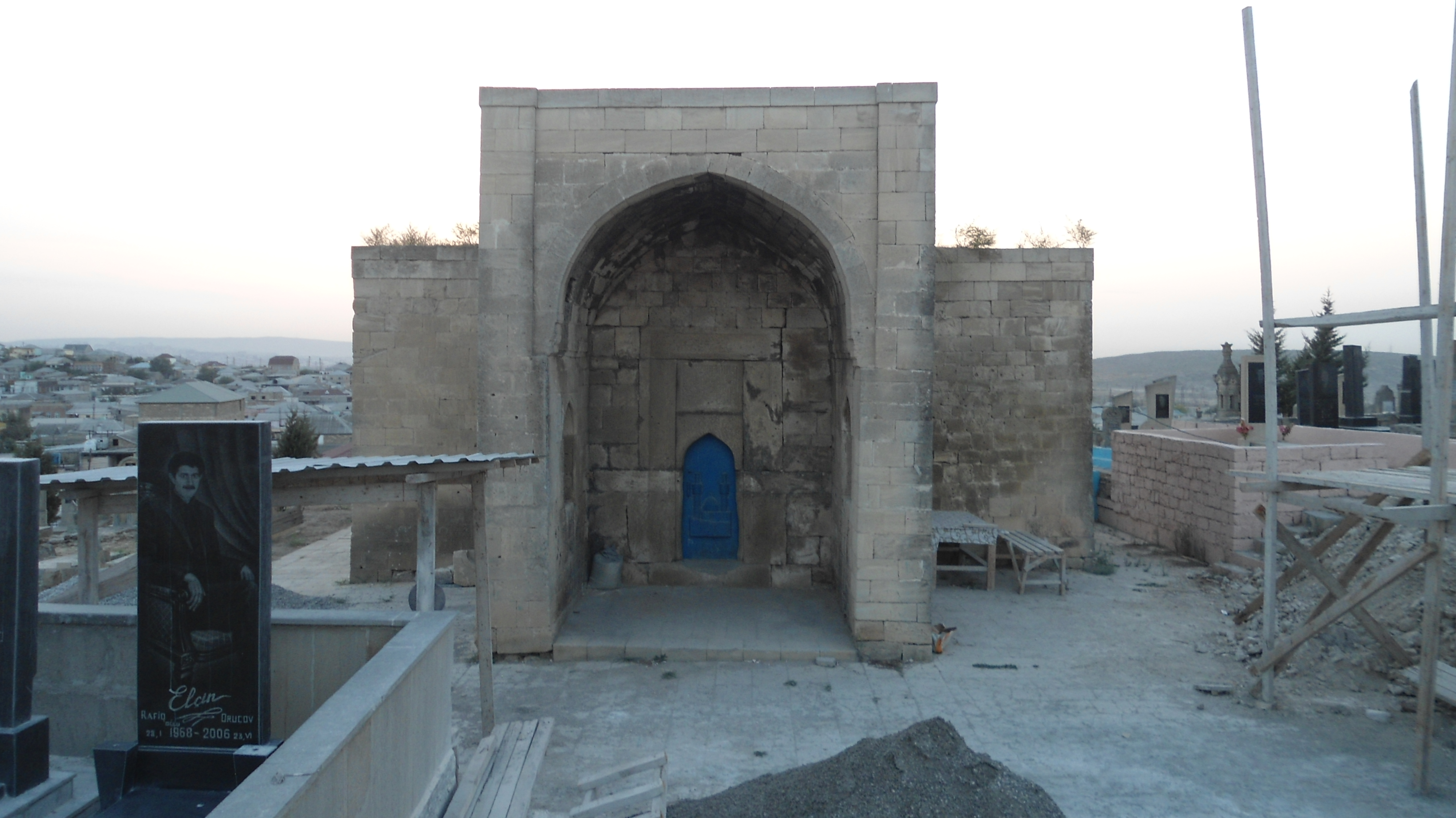

- Location within Azerbaijan

General information
- Type: Mausoleum
- Architectural style: Architectural school of Absheron
- Location: Balakhany, Baku, Azerbaijan
- Coordinates: 40.463719°N 49.920087°E
- Completed: 1427–1428
- Client: Mirirakhur Shakir Agha ibn-marhum Murtaza

Shakiragha mausoleum (Azerbaijani: Şakirağa türbəsi) is a historical monument of the XV century. It is located in Balakhany village in the city of Baku in Azerbaijan.

== History ==
Shakiraga mausoleum is located in Balakhani Cemetery and was built in 1427–1428. It is six meters from the Haji Shahla mosque, which was built in 1385–1386. The information about the monument is limited. The monument was once destroyed by the Soviet as a religious monument.

During an excavation in 1976, gold was found at its foundation. At that time, big earthenware pots full of gold were buried in the basis of the monuments for their future restoration. The mausoleum was repaired with a few percent of the found gold.

There are two-lined inscription in Arabic on the arch-shaped entrance door. Is written in the text:

"Mirirakhur Shakir Agha ibn-marhum Murtaza, one of the elders of the nation and religion, ordered the construction of this monument. Year 831 (1427–28)"

According to another source, Shakiragha mausoleum was erected by Shirvan Ibrahim’s vizier in honor of his son in 1427, and is called a mansion.

== Architectural features ==
The mausoleum consists of hall with a dome and a main arch of the facade with ledge. It is built of white stone, which is a characteristic for Absheron architecture.

The mausoleum is cross-shaped in the plan. There are several cross-shaped monuments (Khan's Garden pavilion in Nardaran, mausoleum in Palace of the Shirvanshahs complex and others) by its interior structure in Absheron. However, there is no second monument in the shape of cross by its both internal and external structure as Shakiragha mausoleum in Azerbaijan.

The entrance to the mausoleum is the portal on the north. At the internal area of the portal, octagonal prism-shaped niches, which are completed with arrow-shaped arch at both sides, are placed. There are also 8 niches of different sized rectangles inside the mausoleum.

The entrance is from the door, which is finished with a low arrow-shaped arch. The arch on the door is hewed from a whole stone. The surface of the stone is decorated with a plant ornament. There is also another stone placed on the arch stone of the entrance, on which two lines of an epic writing is carved. The entrance and the stone with writing are framed with profiled large stone blocks.

== See also ==
- Haji Shahla Mosque
