= Yolçubəyli =

- Municipality
- Location within Azerbaijan
- Coordinates: 40°03′44″N 48°23′25″E
- Country: Azerbaijan
- Rayon: Sabirabad

Population
  - Total: 3,484
- Time zone: UTC+4 (AZT)
  - Summer (DST): UTC+5 (AZT)

Yolçubəyli (also, Yëlchubeyli, Yelshbekly, and Yenibeyli) is a village and municipality in the Sabirabad Rayon of Azerbaijan. It has a population of 3,484.
