= Haji Shahla Mosque =

Former mosque in Balaxanı, Baku, Azerbaijan

- Azerbaijani: Hacı Şəhla məscidi Persian: مسجد حاجی شهلا
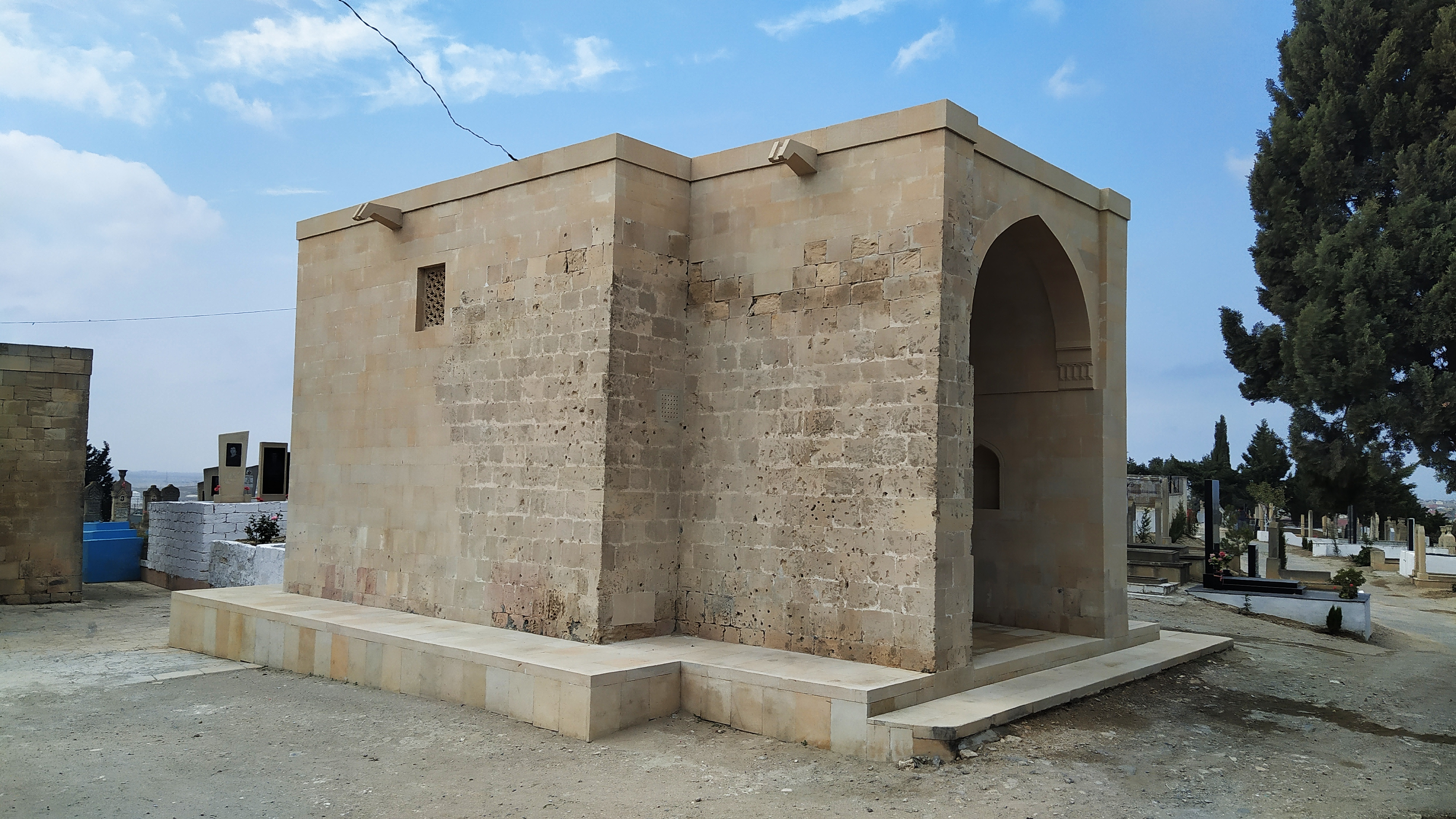
- The former mosque in 2019

- Location of the former mosque in Azerbaijan

Religion
- Affiliation: Islam (former)
- Ecclesiastical or organisational status: Mosque (1386–1928); Profane use (1928–1991)
- Status: Abandoned (as a mosque); Restored

Location
- Location: Balaxanı, Baku
- Country: Azerbaijan
- Coordinates: 40°27′49″N 49°55′12″E

Architecture
- Architects: Ustad Arif, Musa Jibal
- Type: Mosque architecture
- Style: Islamic; Shirvan-Absheron
- Founder: Haji Shahla bin Shakir bin Mustafa Koshki
- Completed: 787 AH (1385/1386 CE)

The Haji Shahla Mosque (Azerbaijani: Hacı Şəhla məscidi, Persian: مسجد حاجی شهلا) is a former mosque and architectural monument located in the Balaxanı town of Baku, in Azerbaijan. The inscription on the mosque indicates that it was built in 787 AH (1385/1386 CE) under the Iranian Shirvanshahs and by the order of Haji Shahla bin Shakir bin Mustafa Koskin, constructed by the master architect Arif, son of the master Musa Jibal.

After Azerbaijan regained independence, the building was included in the list of significant immovable historical and cultural monuments of the country by the decision numbered 132 of the Cabinet of Ministers of the Republic of Azerbaijan on August 2, 2001.

== History ==
The Haji Shahla Mosque was constructed in the years 1385-1386 during the Shirvanshah period on a high hill in the cemetery of Balaxanı. The mosque consists of an entrance portal and an interior chamber. Above the entrance gate, a two-line inscription, translated into English, reads:

This structure belongs to Haji Shahla, son of Shakir, son of Mustafa Koshkin. Year seven hundred and eighty-seven (787 AH (1385/1386 CE)).

Slightly to the left of this inscription, a smaller inscription placed a bit apart from the doorframe reveals the name of the master who built the mosque. This two-line inscription, translated into English, reads: "Constructed by Master Arif, son of Master Musa from Jibal." It's noteworthy that the inscriptions on it refer to the mosque as a "mansion."

In 1918, the atrocities committed by Armenian Dashnaks during the March massacres continued in Balaxanı. The village community defended itself from the enemy by fortifying the hill where the mosque is located. After this event, the hill on which the mosque stood was referred to as "sangar" by the residents of the village.

=== Soviet occupation ===
After the Soviet occupation, an official campaign against religion began in 1928. In December of that year, the Azerbaijan Communist Party Central Committee transferred many mosques, churches, and synagogues to educational clubs for their use in enlightening directions. If in 1917 there were 3,000 mosques in Azerbaijan, by 1927, this number had reduced to 1,700, and by 1933, had dropped to 17.

Following this, many mosques were closed down and left unused, resulting in their deterioration and destruction.

=== After Azerbaijan's independence ===
After the restoration of Azerbaijan's independence, the mosque was included in the list of significant immovable historical and cultural monuments of the country. This was according to Decision No. 132 of the Cabinet of Ministers of the Republic of Azerbaijan dated August 2, 2001.

In 2017, the Haji Shahla mosque was restored with financial support from philanthropists among the residents of the Balaxanı settlement. The restoration works were carried out under the supervision of specialists from the State Service for Protection, Development, and Restoration of Cultural Heritage under the Ministry of Culture. During the restoration of the monument, bullet traces from the battles during the March Massacre were preserved on the walls of the historical building.

== See also ==
- Islam in Azerbaijan
- List of mosques in Azerbaijan
- List of mosques in Baku
- Shakiragha mausoleum
