= Ali Akbar (writer) =

Azerbaijani journalist, translator and writer

- Born: 28 January 1978 (age 47); Baku, Azerbaijani SSR
- Education: Marmara University,
- Occupation(s): journalist and writer

Alakbar Aliagha oglu Aliyev, commonly known as Alekper Aliyev or Ali Akbar (Azerbaijani: Ələkbər Əliyev, Əli Əkbər; born 28 January 1978), is an Azerbaijani journalist, translator, and writer based in Switzerland.

Aliyev attended a public school in Baku, but after the eighth grade, he continued his secondary education in Turkey. In 1996, he was admitted to Marmara University and graduated with a degree in journalism in 2000. He continued to work in Turkey as the head of the communications department and translator at the Kaknus publishing house. Akbar's works mainly deal with the taboos in Azerbaijani society. He has written four novels to this day and is also the editor-in-chief of the Kultura.az website.

In 2009, Alekper Aliyev published a book entitled Artush and Zaur, a homosexual love tale between an Armenian and an Azerbaijani who felt apart after the First Nagorno-Karabakh War. The book became highly controversial and was banned in bookstores in both Armenia and Azerbaijan which for the past two decades have been bitter rivals due to the ongoing ethnic conflict over Nagorno-Karabakh and where homosexuality is still highly stigmatised.
