= Artush and Zaur =

2009 novel by Ali Akbar

Artush and Zaur (Azerbaijani: Artuş və Zaur) is a novel by Azerbaijani writer and journalist Ali Akbar (alias of Alakbar Aliyev) published in 2009. It narrates the love story of two fictional men: Artush Saroyan, an Armenian, and Zaur Jalilov, an Azerbaijani. The novel became a controversy due to the existing enmity between Armenia and Azerbaijan as a result of the ongoing Nagorno-Karabakh conflict, as well as homosexuality being a taboo topic in both societies, despite being made legal in the early 2000s.

== Author's viewpoint ==
In a 2009 interview, Ali Akbar stated that the chosen topic united "morally justified, mentally approved and intellectually substantiated" negative stereotypes which exist in Azerbaijani society. According to him, people of Azerbaijan should not label those they dislike as "homosexual" and "Armenian", because these characteristics are nothing to be ashamed of, unlike bribery, embezzlement, theft, treason, and libel. He described the theme of homosexuality as a distracting manoeuvre behind the more significant theme of the mutual estrangement of the two societies.

== Plot ==
The novel consists of six segments (The Meeting, The Retrospective, Rain and Wine, Marriage and Parting, Sleepwalking, and The Maiden Tower). Each segment begins with a quotation from a ghazal (a love poem) by mediaeval Azeri poet Nasimi dedicated to an Armenian, where the word "Armenian" (Azerbaijani: erməni) constitutes a monorhyme.

The novel begins with an Azerbaijani journalist and non-governmental organisation activist Zaur Jalilov leaving his native city of Baku, Azerbaijan, for a conference in Tbilisi, the capital of neighbouring Georgia. There he confronts a fellow journalist from Armenia named Artush Saroyan. Both men are left perplexed, as the next part reveals that Artush was in fact an Armenian refugee who fled Baku with his family as a teenager some 17 years ago in the midst of the Nagorno-Karabakh conflict. Prior to the conflict, Artush and Zaur were classmates who had been involved with each other sexually as preteens and soon afterwards had found themselves in love with each other. Even though the war tore them apart, the Tbilisi meeting made both Artush and Zaur realise that they still nurtured mutual feelings.

After spending time together in Tbilisi, the two decide to marry despite the fact that, similar to their home countries, the Georgian law makes no provision for same-sex marriages. With the help of their Georgian colleague and friend Shota, the couple heads to Poti to meet Klaas Hendrikse, a Dutch priest said to be the mentor of Georgia's First Lady Sandra Roelofs. He performs a wedding ceremony for Artush and Zaur in accordance with the regulations of the Protestant Church in the Netherlands. After returning to Baku, Zaur seeks a way to visit Artush in Armenia where free entrance of Azerbaijani citizens has been prohibited since the advent of the war. Through an NGO, he manages to arrange for participation in a two-day civil conference in Yerevan where Artush resides. However upon Zaur's arrival in Yerevan, Artush refuses to meet, explaining this by his fear of the Armenian secret service which would later persecute him and his family for rubbing shoulders with a citizen of an enemy state.

Back in Baku, Zaur is attacked by members of the radical movement Organisation for the Freedom of Karabakh in retaliation for his visit to Armenia. They harass and threaten him and force him to participate in a state-sponsored television program to make denouncing statements with regard to his journey, in line with the state's official anti-Armenian propaganda. Meanwhile, Artush meets a priest in Echmiadzin whose nephew is due to represent Armenia in an upcoming wrestling championship to be held in Baku. Through him Artush manages to be included in the official list of media reporters who will accompany the athletes. In Baku, Artush escapes the event and meets Zaur. The two spend the night together only to discover in the morning that Artush's disappearance was reported to Azerbaijani authorities and he is being searched. Realising the problems, public reproach and punishment they will face if caught, Artush and Zaur head to Old City, Baku where they climb to the Maiden Tower and commit joint suicide by jumping from its top.

== Critical reception ==
Azerbaijani-Russian writer Chingiz Huseynov noted the forbiddenness of the topic and compared the controversial nature of the novel to that of Nabokov's Lolita. According to him, the rather allegorical ending of the book reveals the tragedy of a couple who is victimised not for being homosexual (which is still a taboo in the South Caucasus), but for belonging to two rival nations.

Soon after the release of the book Ali Akbar said he was contacted by fellow journalists from the Armenian news agency PanARMENIAN.Net who said the plot was not realistic, as "there are no gays in Armenia."

== Public reception and ban ==
In his home country, Ali Akbar became a target of criticism and was blamed for lack of patriotism, cynicism and immorality by many. None of the publishing houses in Azerbaijan agreed to print Artush and Zaur: some out of fear for their reputation and some finding the book "appalling". The novel was finally printed in Ulan Bator, Mongolia, in 500 copies, 150 of which were sold in Baku in the three weeks following the release.

On 10 March 2009, it was reported that the Sabayil district police ordered that the remaining books be withdrawn from the bookshelves at the Ali and Nino chain store in Baku and cancel the presentation of the book scheduled for the next day under the threat of closing down the stores. The pretext was that the book contained "anti-President" and "anti-government" remarks. However Ali Akbar stated that the President was not mentioned in the book at all.
