= Balaxanı =

Balaxanı Balxuni
- Municipality
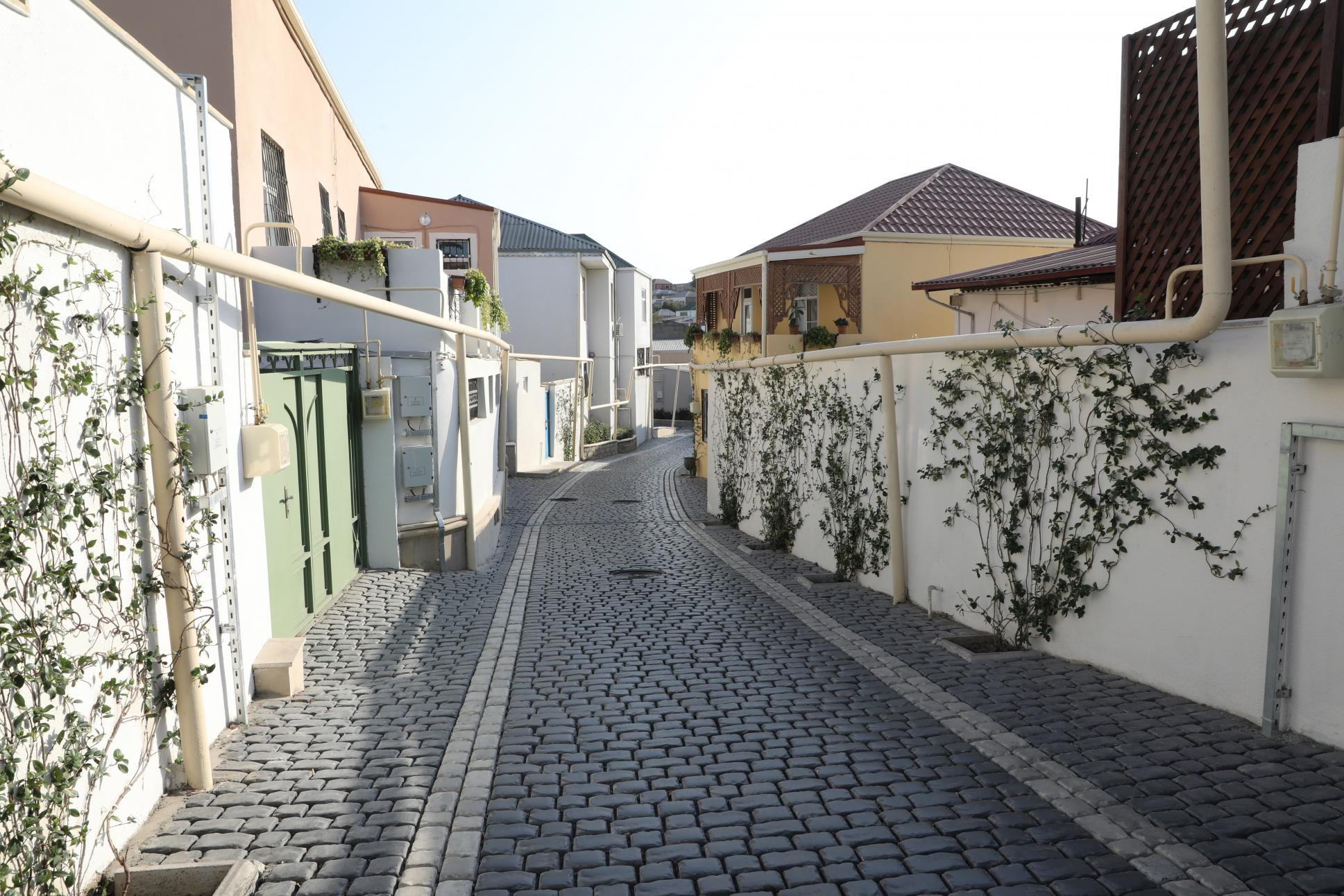
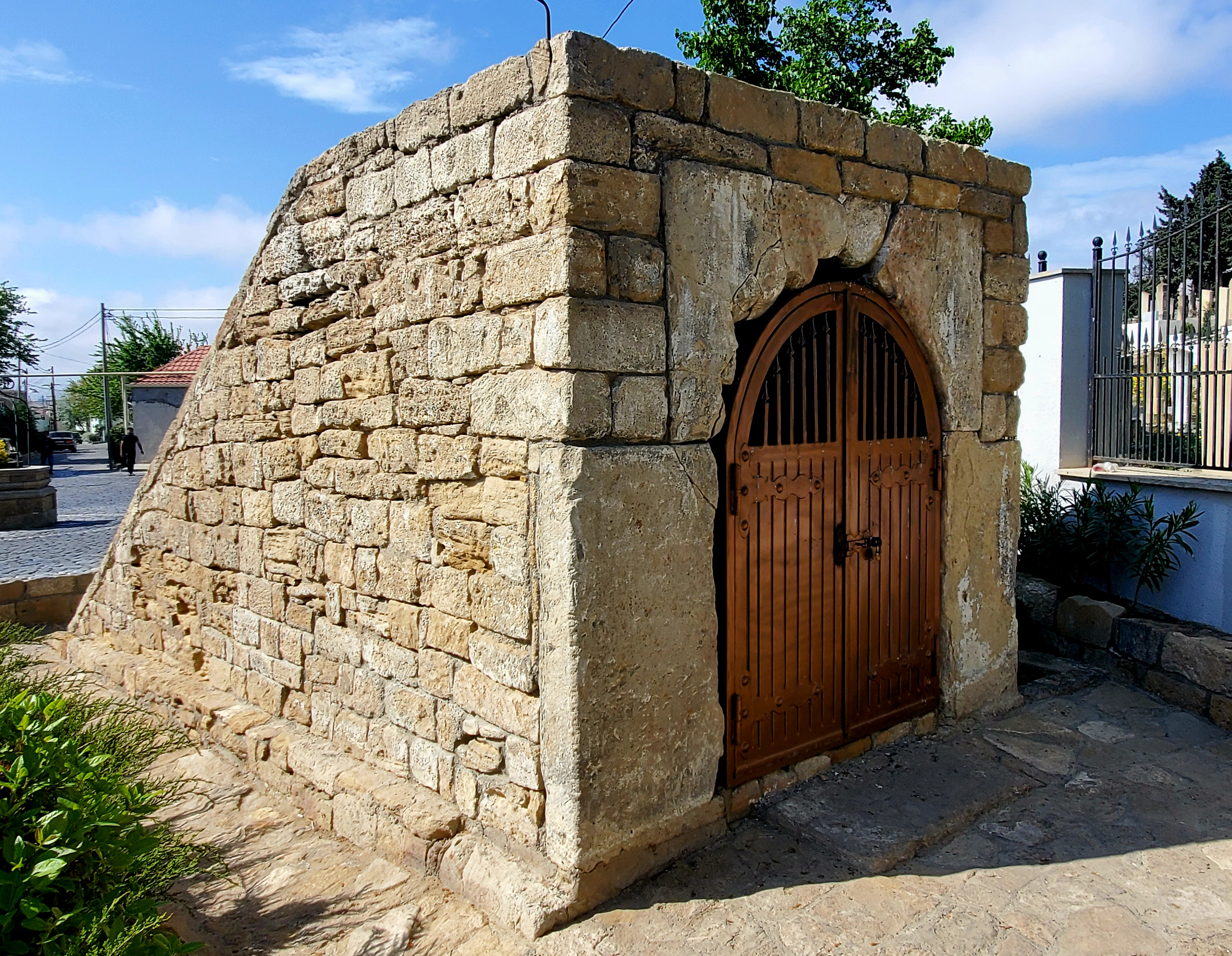
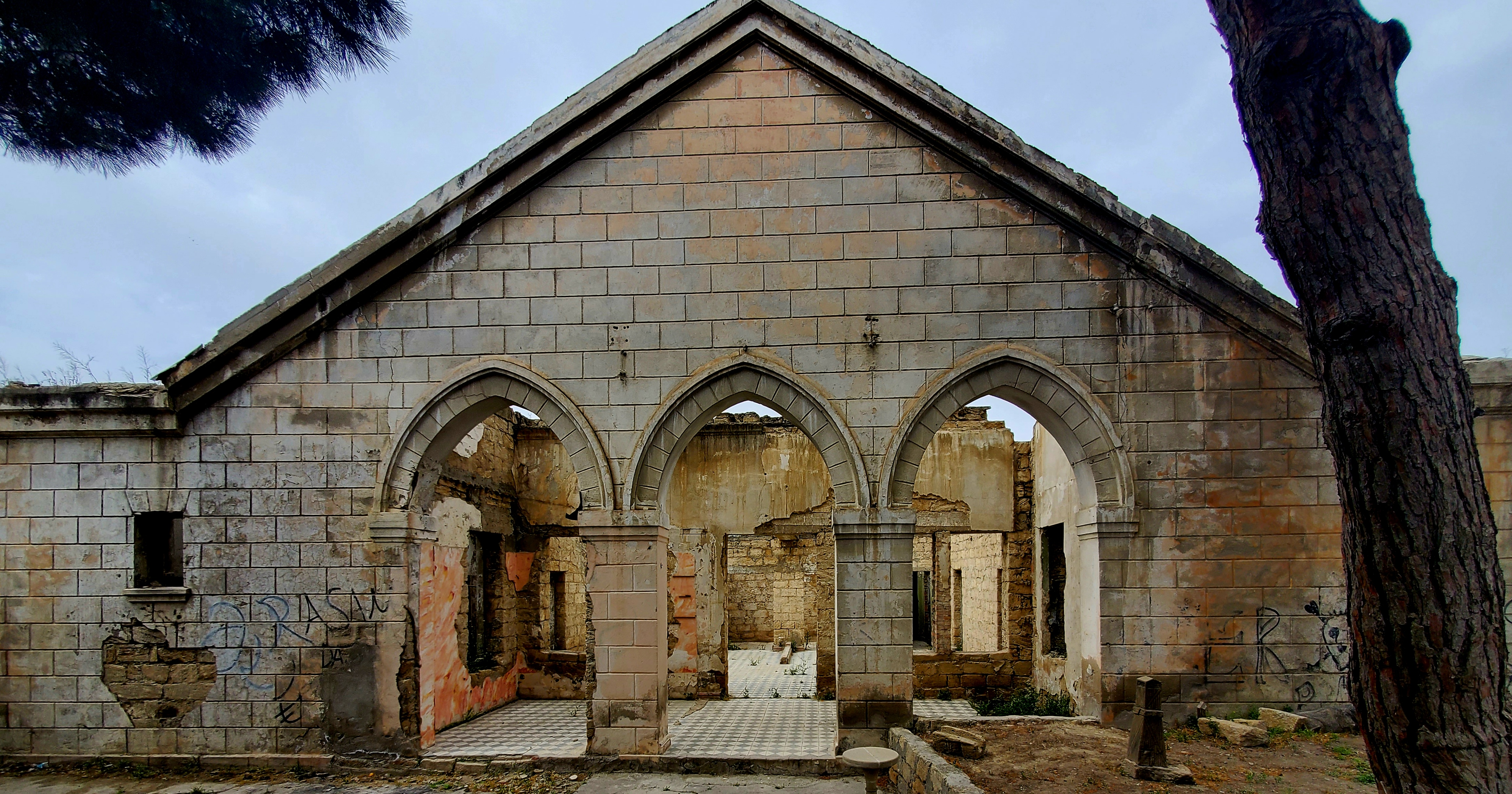
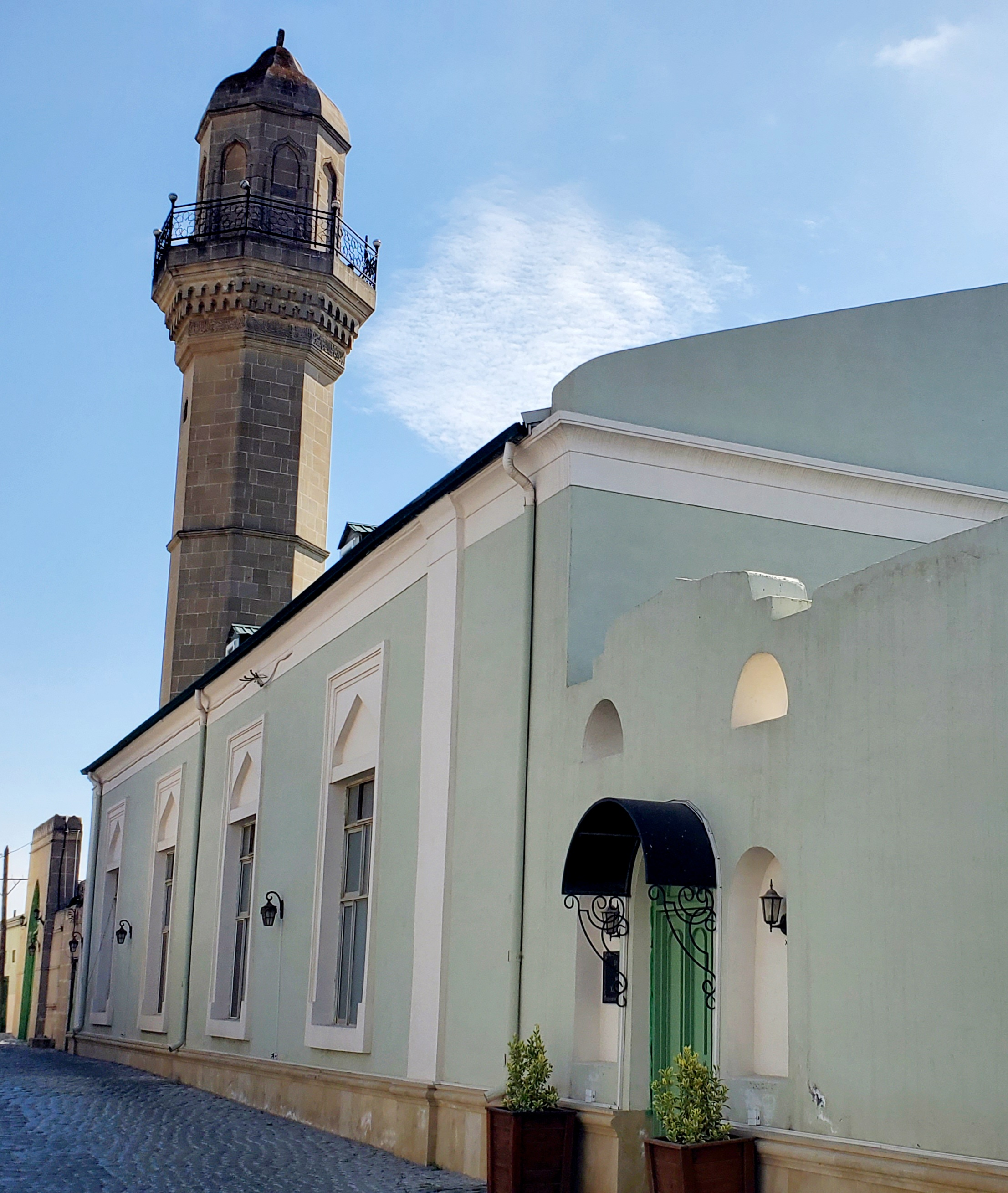
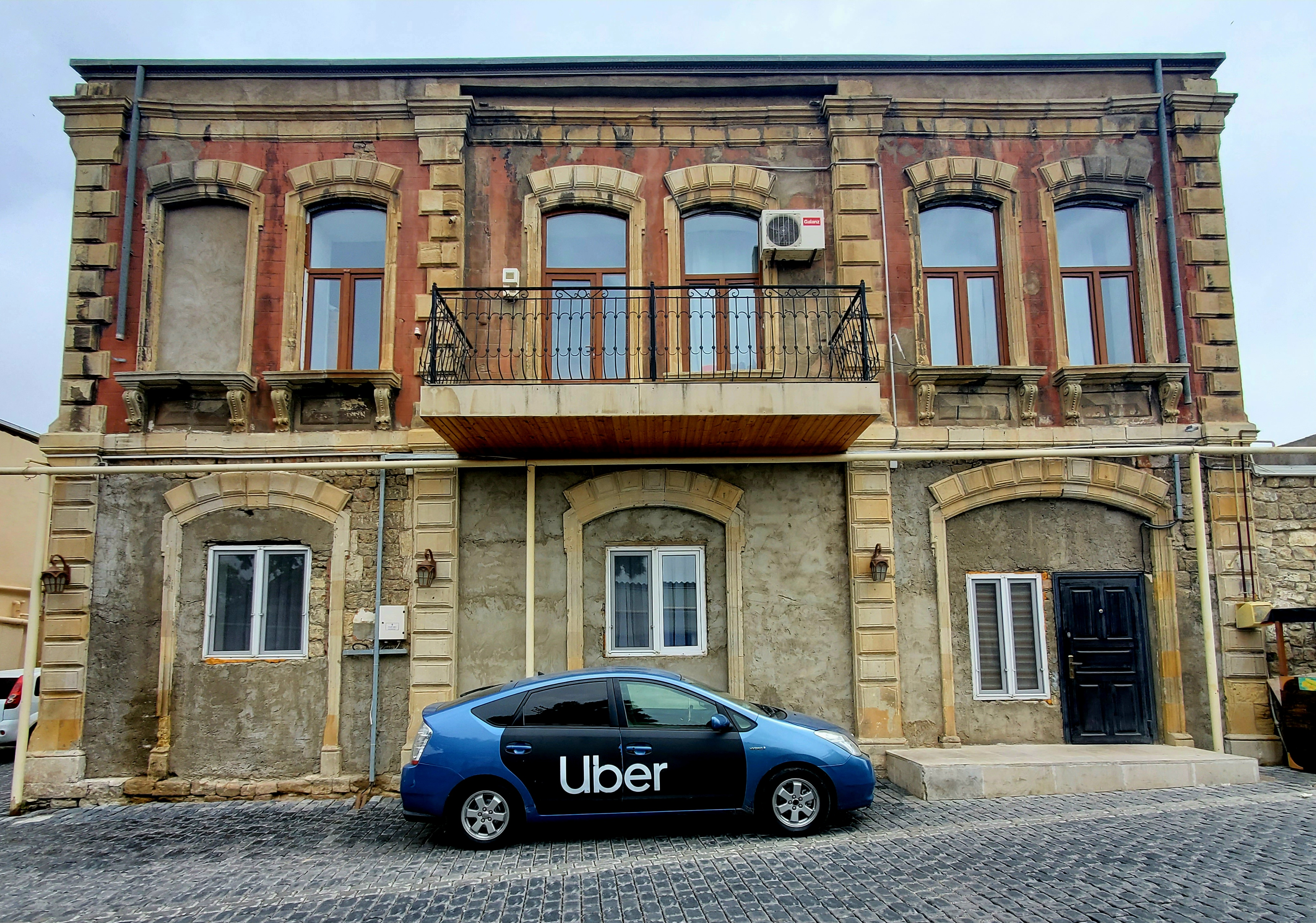
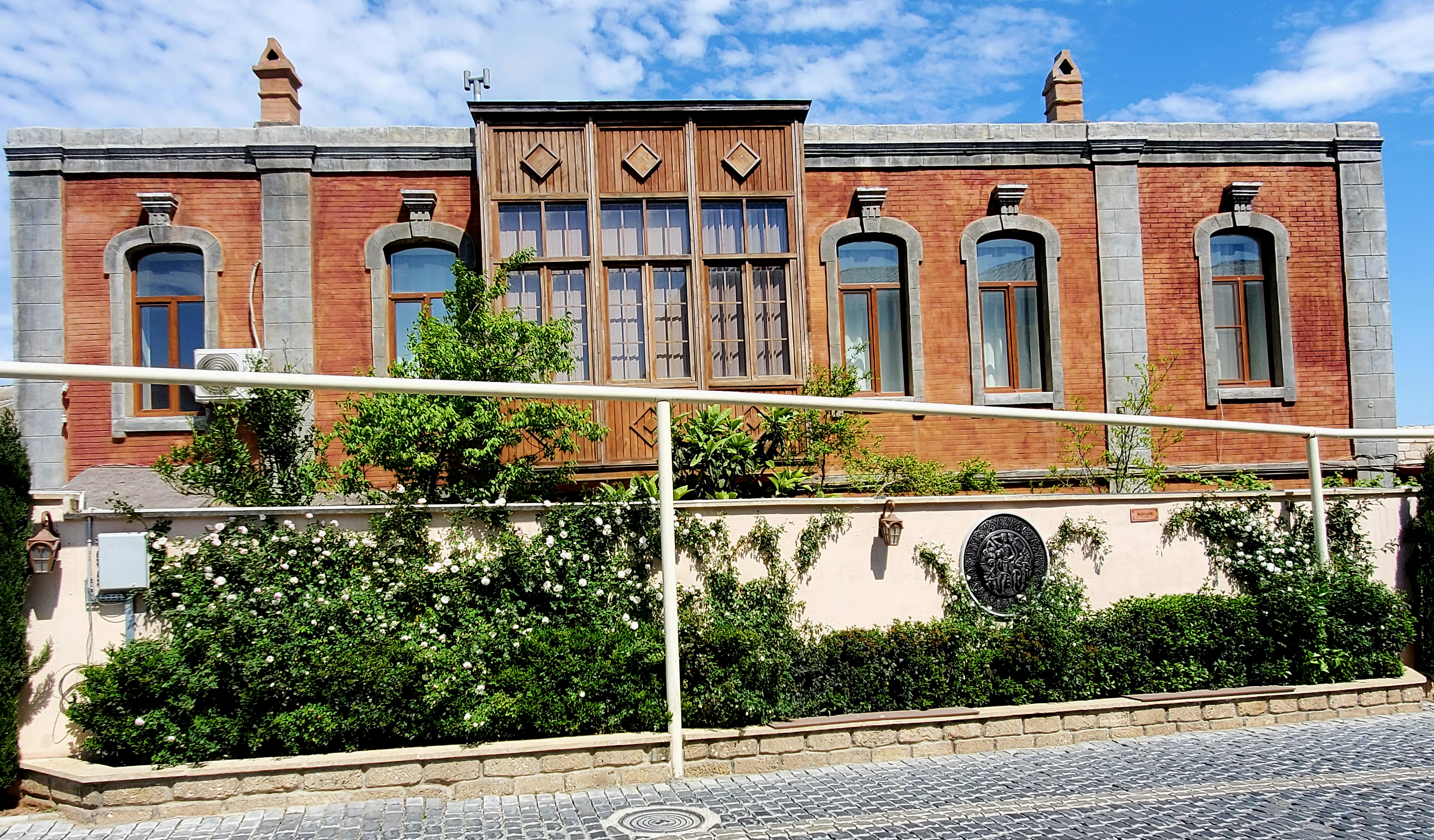
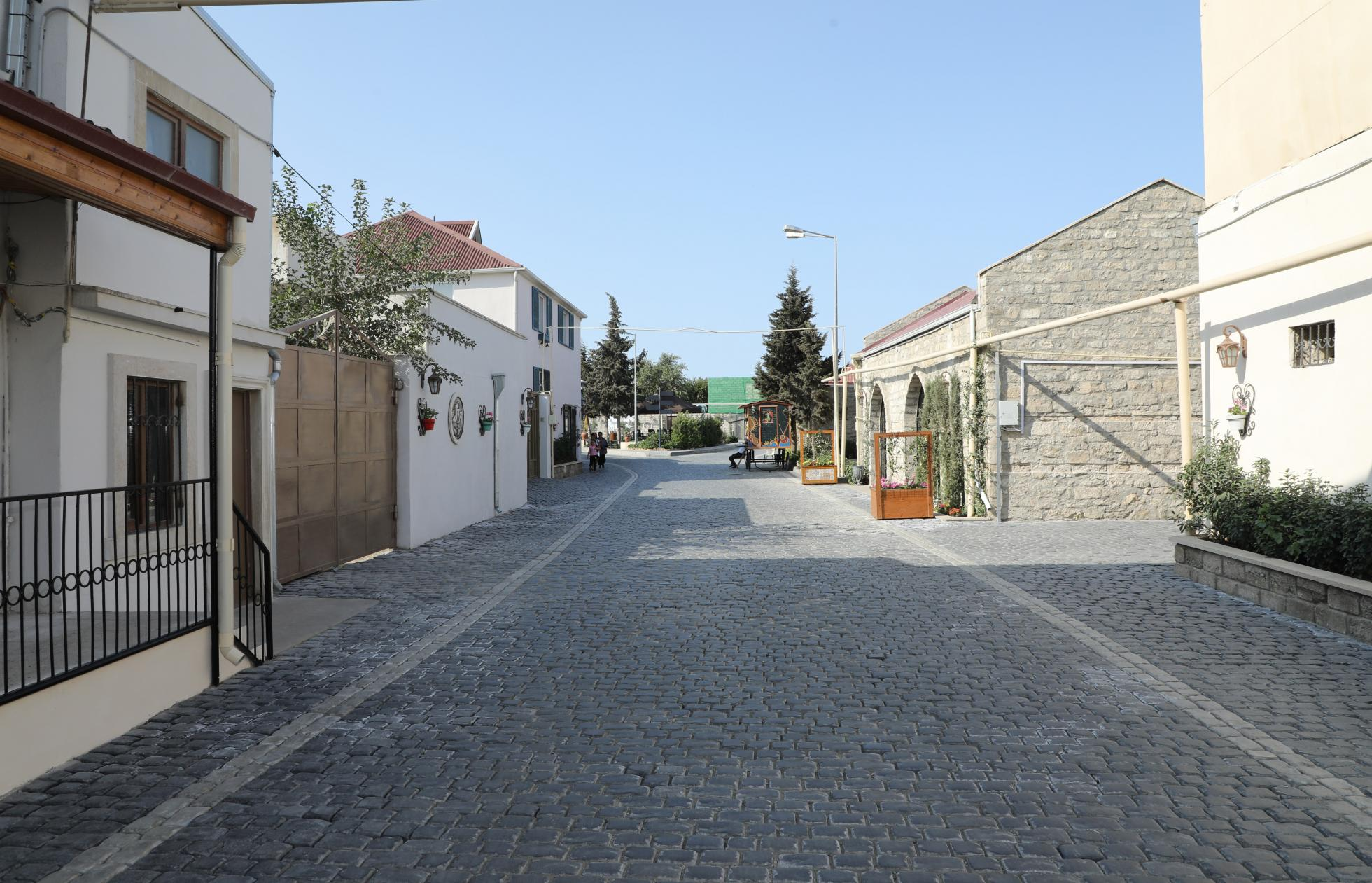
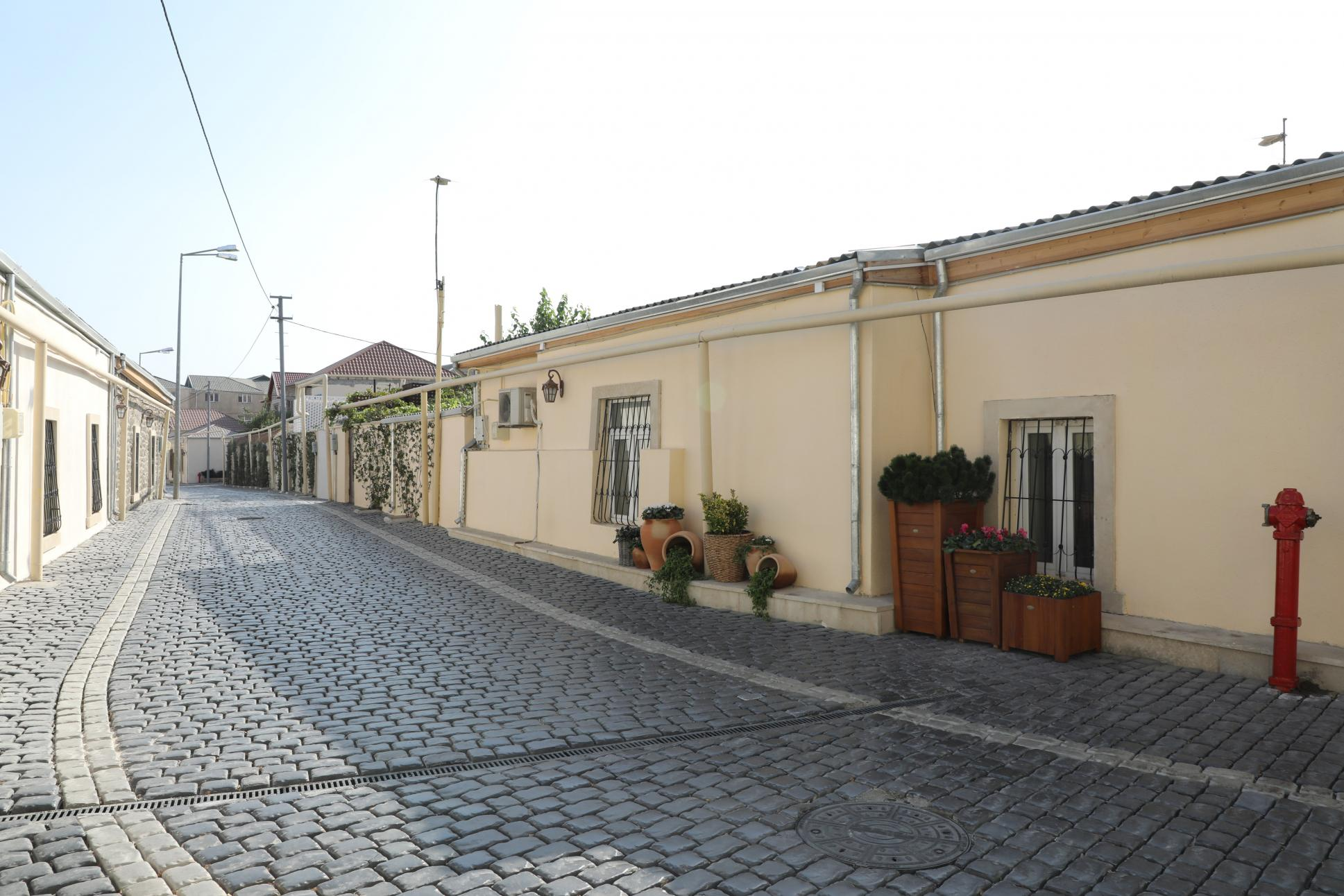

- Location within Azerbaijan
- Coordinates: 40°27′42″N 49°55′12″E
- Country: Azerbaijan
- City: Baku
- Raion: Sabunchu

Population (2015)
  - Total: 11,615
- Time zone: UTC+4 (AZT)
  - Summer (DST): UTC+5 (AZT)

Balaxanı or Balakhani (Tat: Balxuni) is a settlement and municipality near Baku, Azerbaijan, on the Absheron Peninsula. Taking advantage of the area's oil pools, a 35 m deep well was dug manually in 1593. The Russians built the first oil-distilling factory here in 1837. In the 1886 official census, 2,843 ethnic Tats were living here.

As of 2015 its population was 11,615.

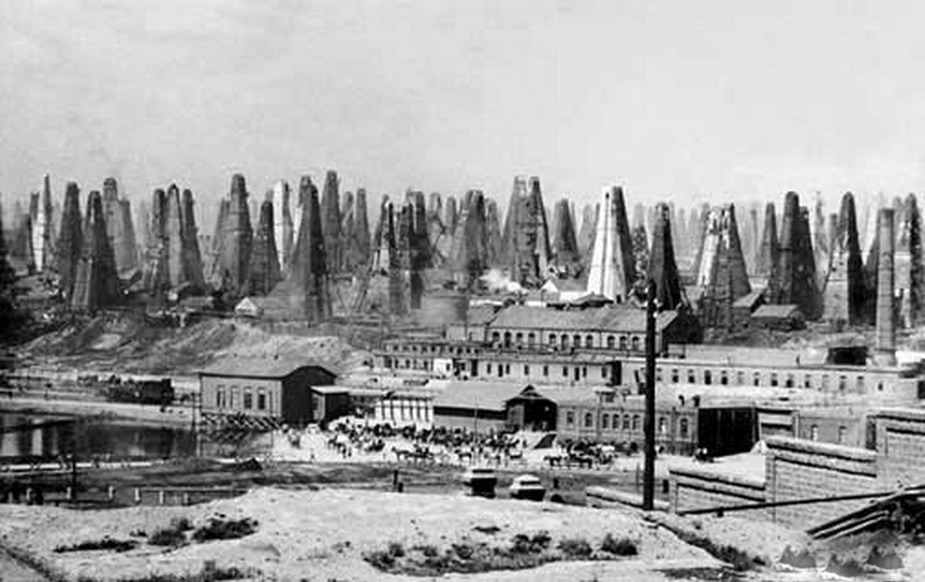
The Nobel Brothers' oil wells in Balakhany in the late 19th century.

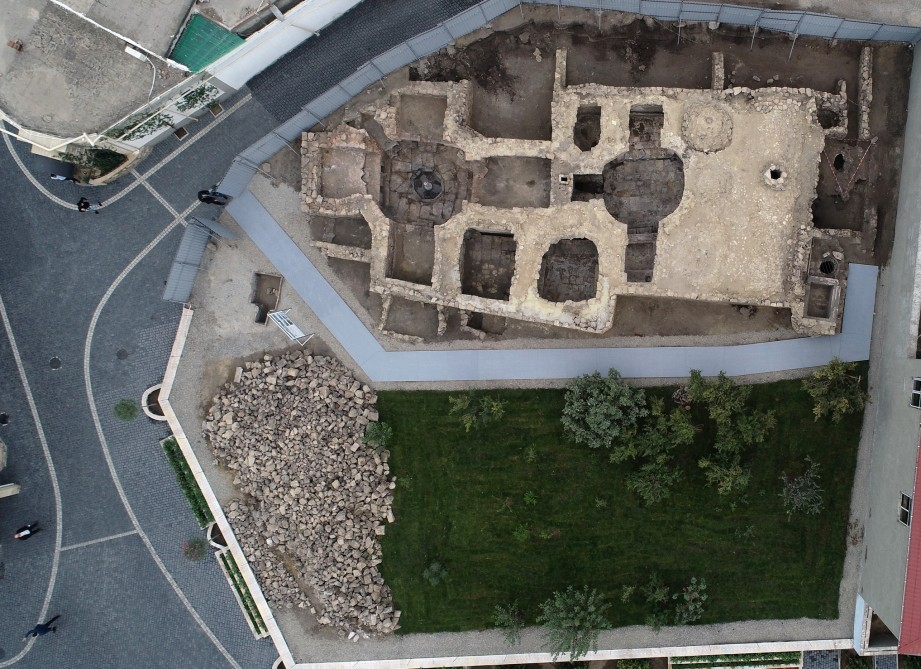
Balakhani old Bath (Hamam)

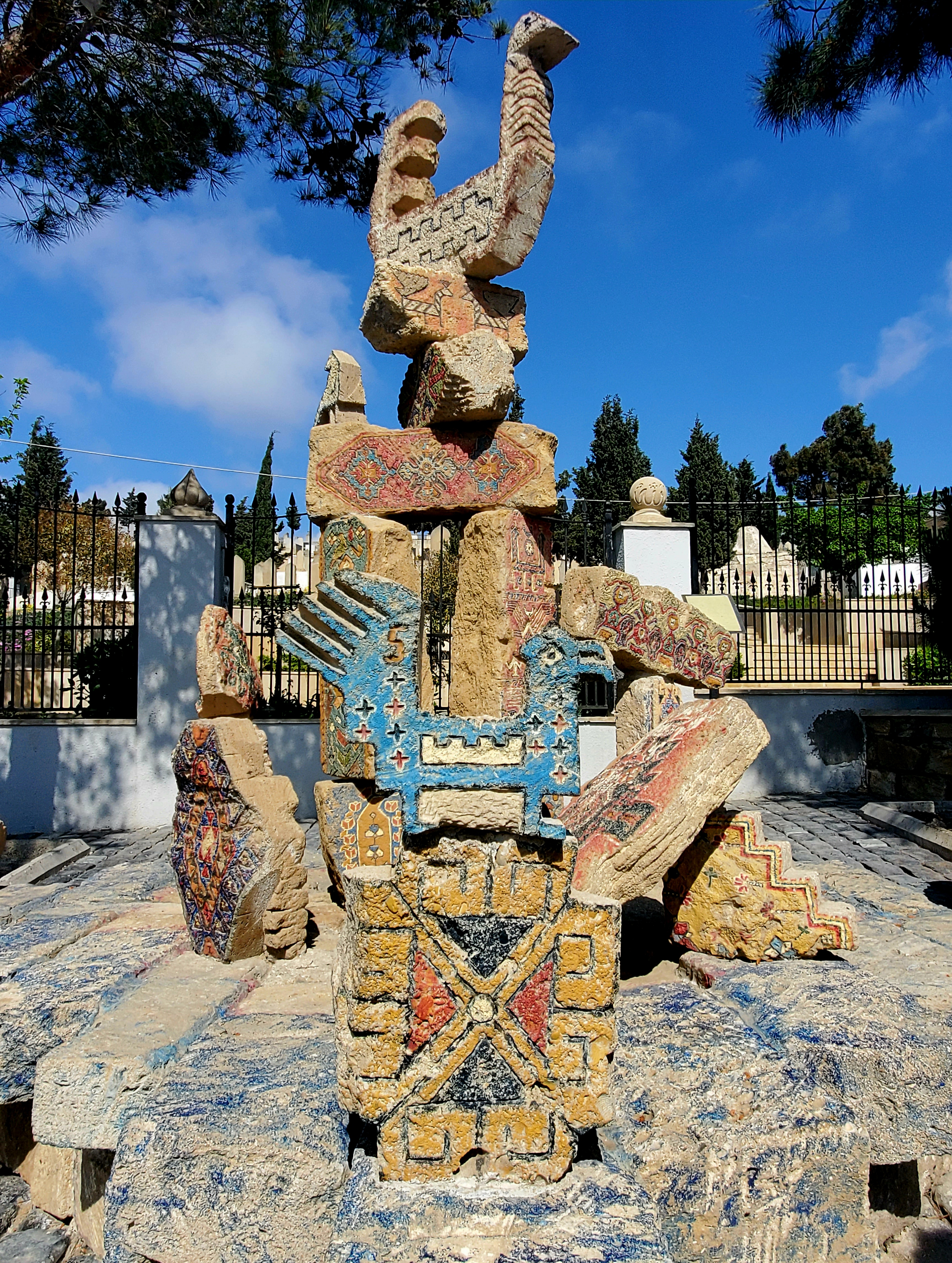
Sculpture in Balakhani Square

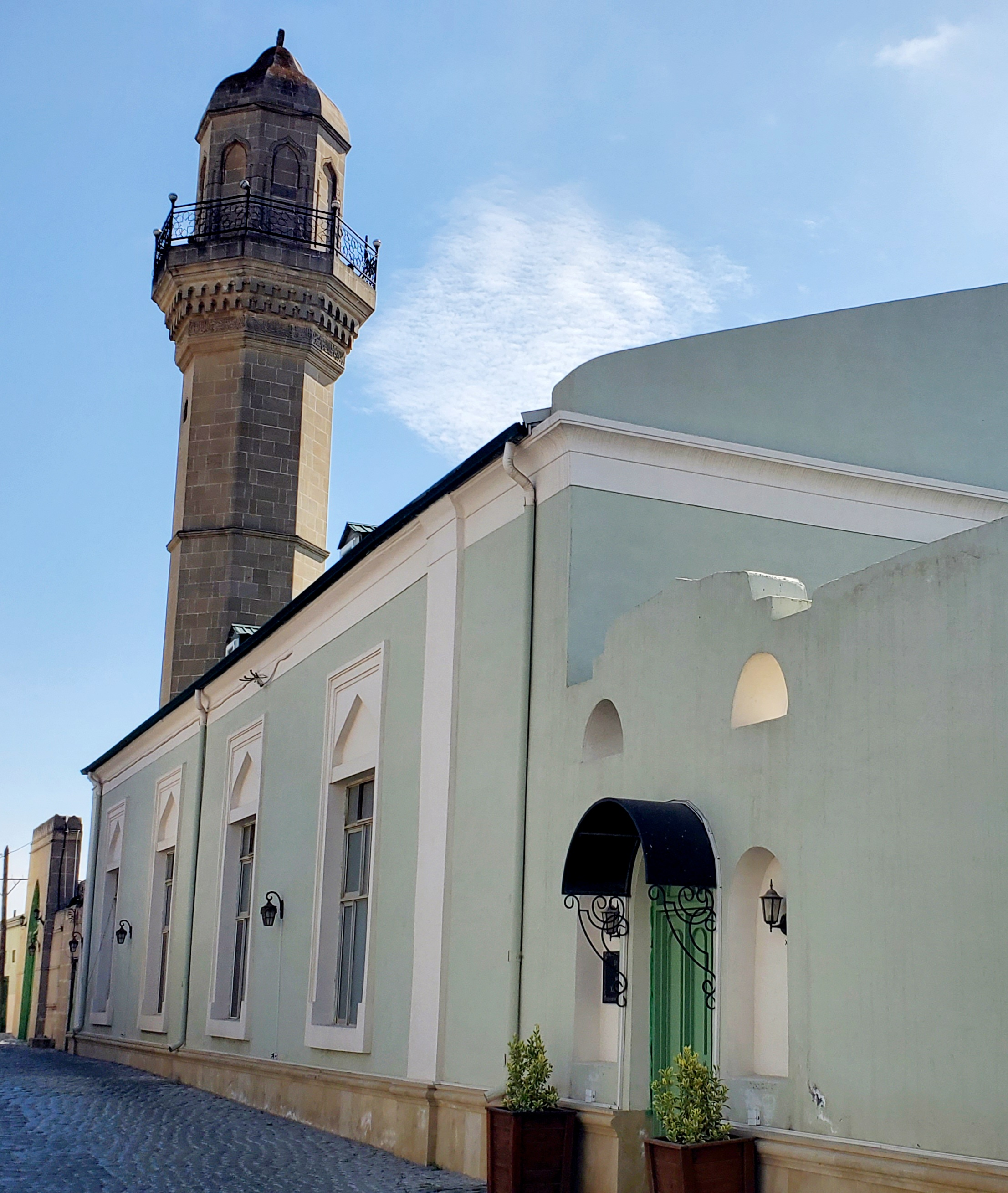
Juma Mosque

== Places of interest ==
- Shah Sefi's Caravanserai, monument
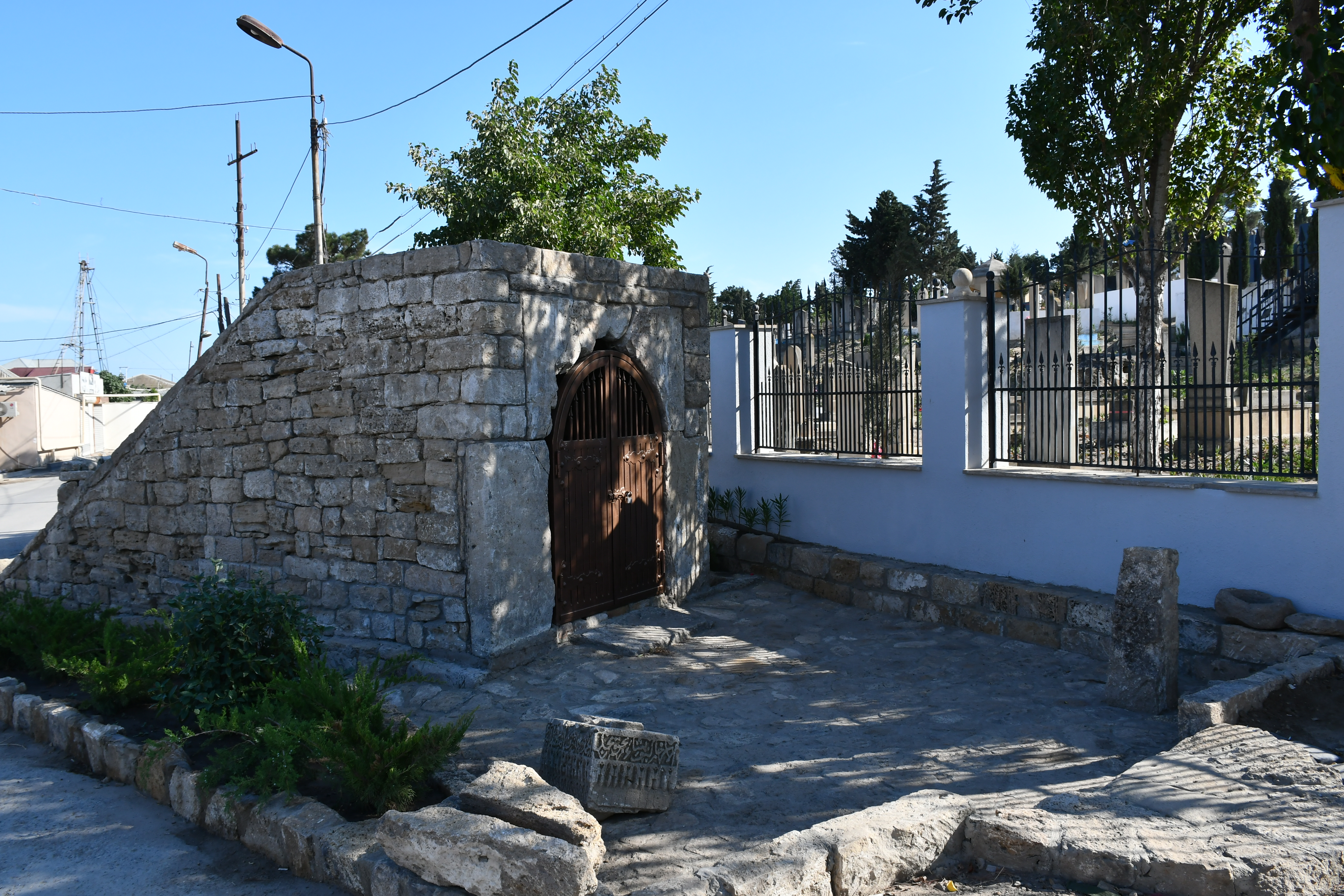
Balakhani ovdan

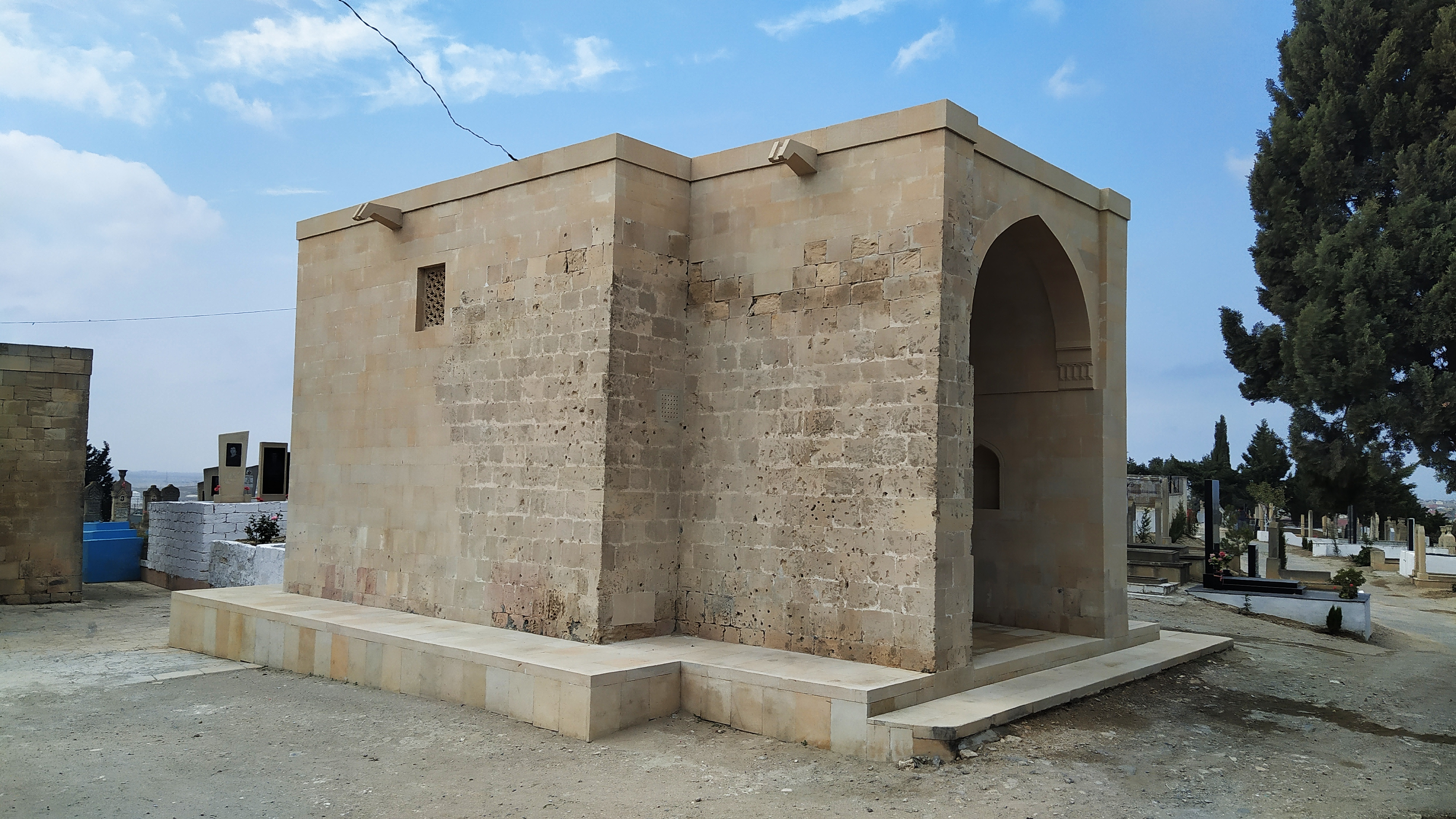
Shahla mosque

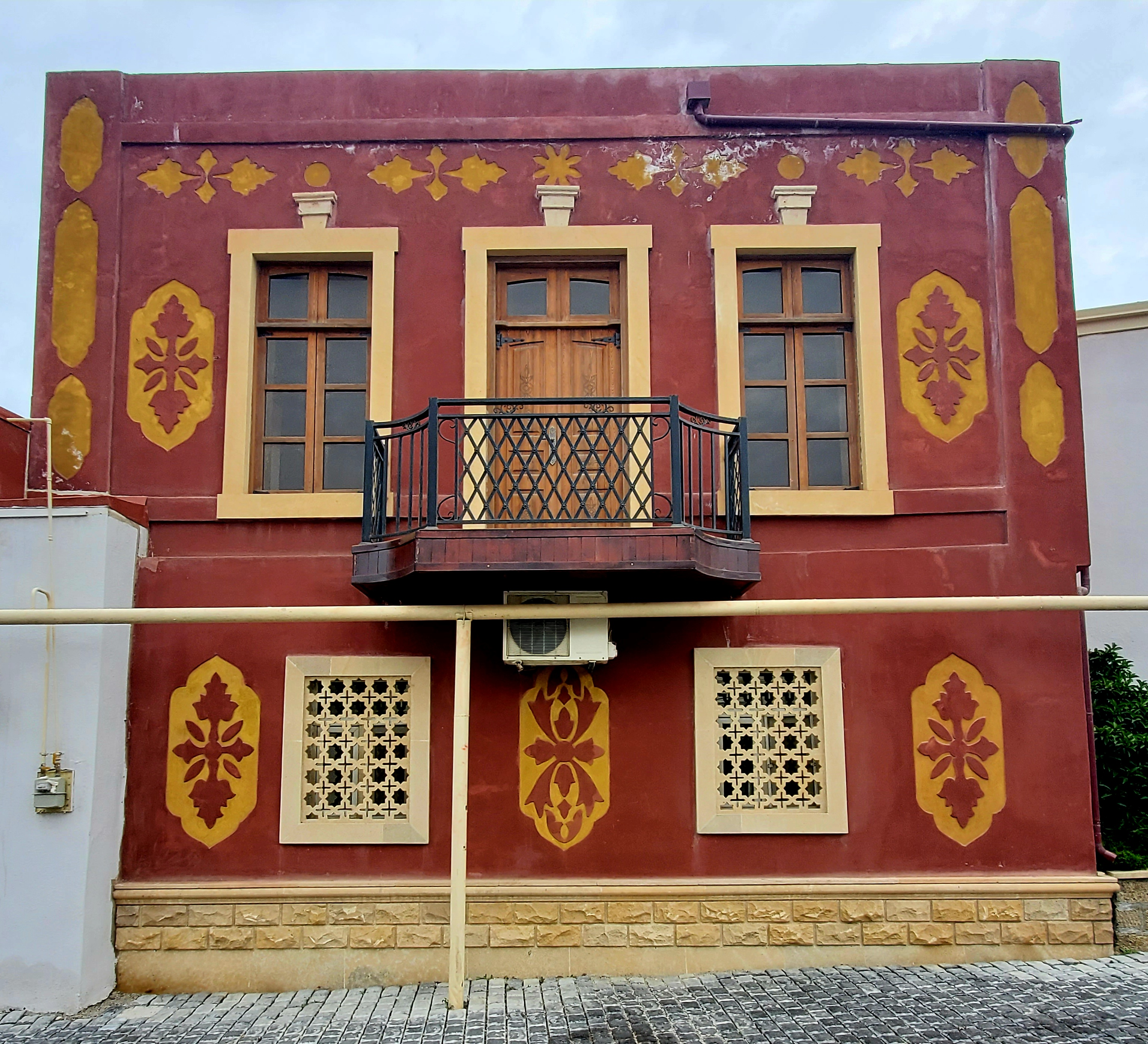
Balakhani houses

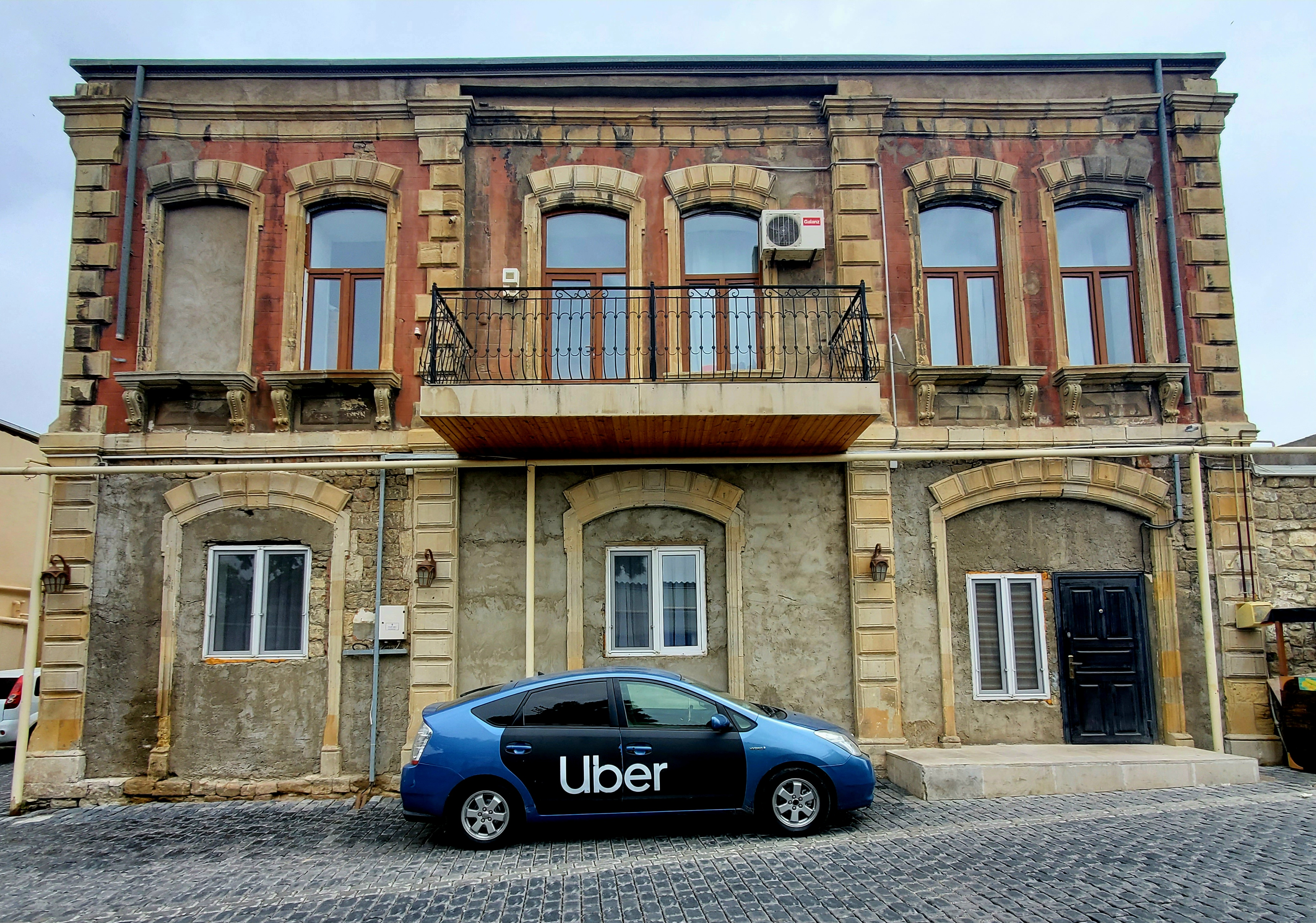
Balakhani street

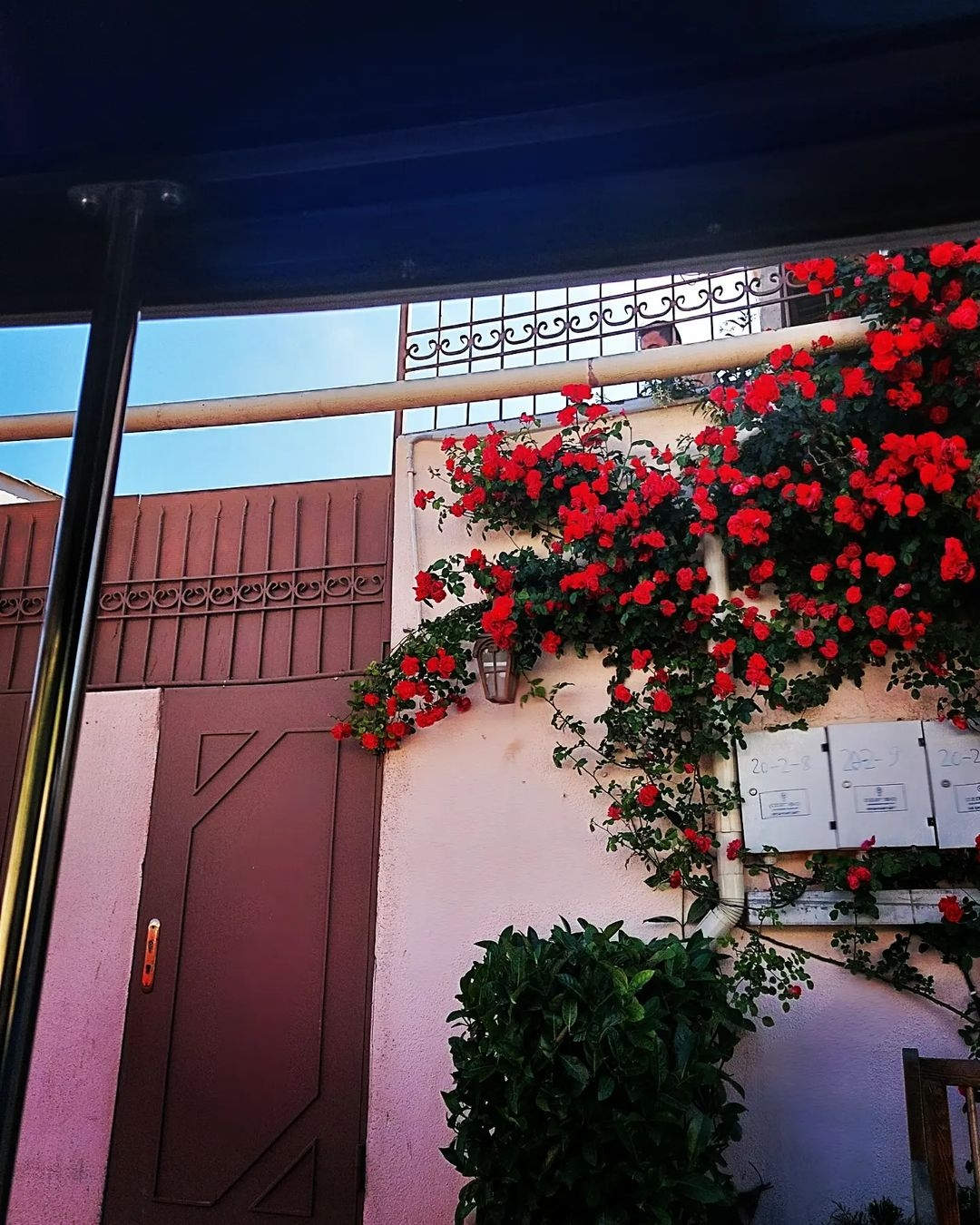

== Notable natives ==
- Sadig Rahimov, Chairman of the Council of Ministers of Azerbaijan SSR (1954–1958)
- Kampan Gadimov, oil magnate and philanthropist

== See also ==
- Petroleum industry in Azerbaijan
- Ovdan (Balakhani)
- Haji Shahla Mosque
