= Nizami park =

Park in Baku, Azerbaijan

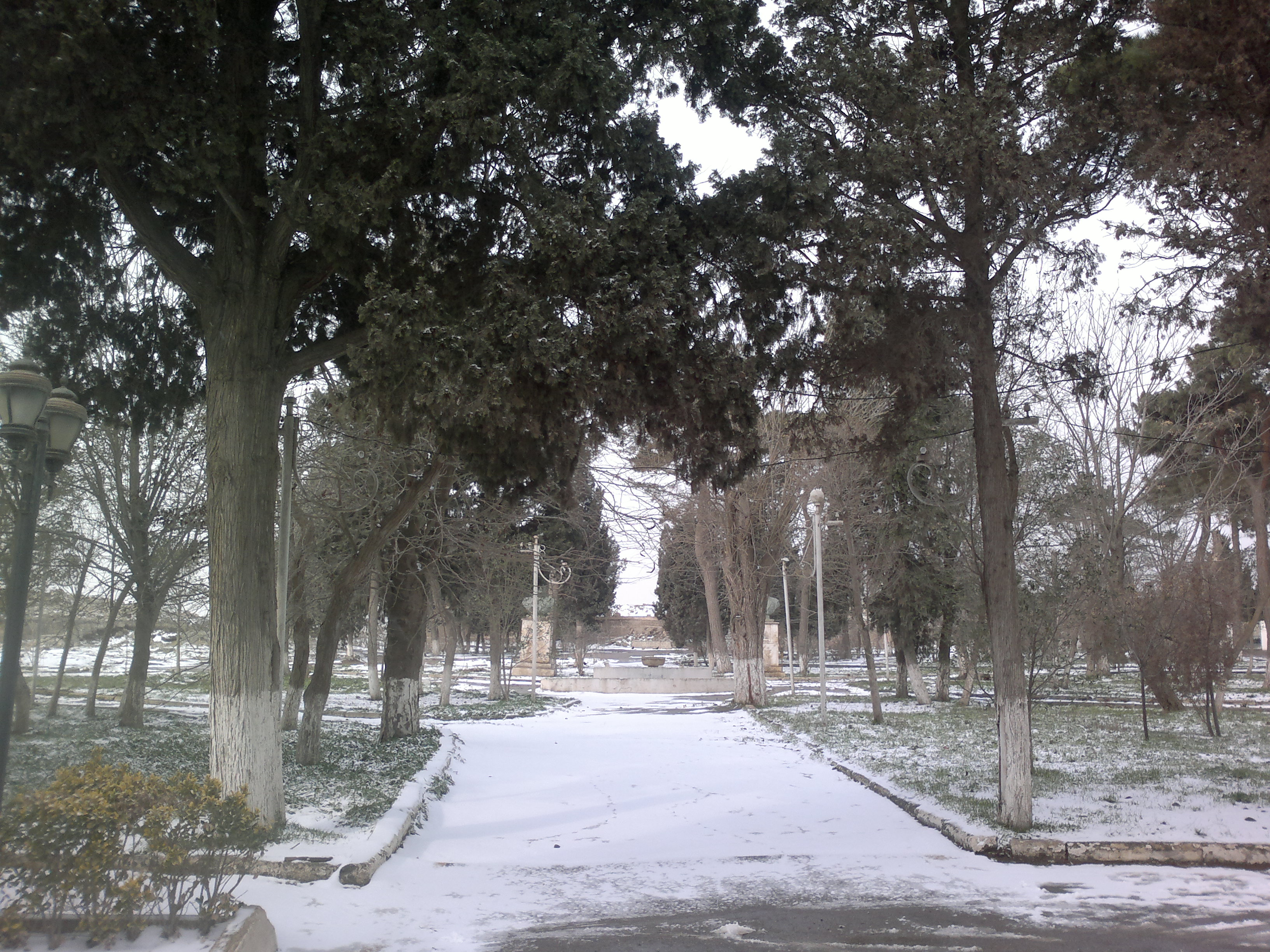
- Interactive map of Nizami park
- Type: Urban park
- Location: Baku, Azerbaijan
- Coordinates: 40°22′45″N 49°53′39″E
- Area: 13,6 hectare
- Created: 1882-1883

The Nizami Park (Azerbaijani: Nizami parkı) is one of the oldest parks in Baku, the capital of Azerbaijan. It is located in the Khatai district of the city on the territory of the Villa Petrolea, a residential settlement built by the Nobel brothers at the end of the 19th century for the employees of their company on the border of the Black City in the suburbs of Baku. The total area of the park is 13.6 hectares. This park, in an industrial landscape located on a vast territory, had a positive impact on the gardening architecture of Absheron. After 1920, the former garden of the Villa Petrolea was named after Lunacharsky, later - “Rote-Fane”, in honour of the German newspaper with the same name, and later was named after Nizami Ganjavi.

== Park’s history ==
=== Park’s creation ===
In 1882–1883, thanks to the efforts of the Nobel brothers, who were involved in the development of the oil fields on the Absheron Peninsula on the border of the Black and White cities in Baku, a settlement was created for the company's employees – the "Oil Villa" (Villa Petrolea). Within just one to two years, an area of 10.26 hectares was landscaped. Almost the same area (10.03 hectares) was reached by the public plantings in Baku by 1920, over the 80 years of the existence of buildings outside the city walls.

The factory district of Baku, almost 8 km away from the centre, was unfavourable both in terms of the natural data and in terms of the landscaping. Nevertheless, it was considered acceptable for the life of Baku's proletariat. However, the administrative and technical staff did not agree neither to work, nor to live in such an environment, even for a high remuneration. In this regard, the Nobels, in order not to lose the invited specialists, offered advantageous living conditions for them. To create a large green massif with an area of about 10 hectares among the mass of oil tanks, barns, and oil refineries near the village of Keshla, the famous specialist E.Beckle was invited, under whose leadership many gardens and parks in Warsaw were created.

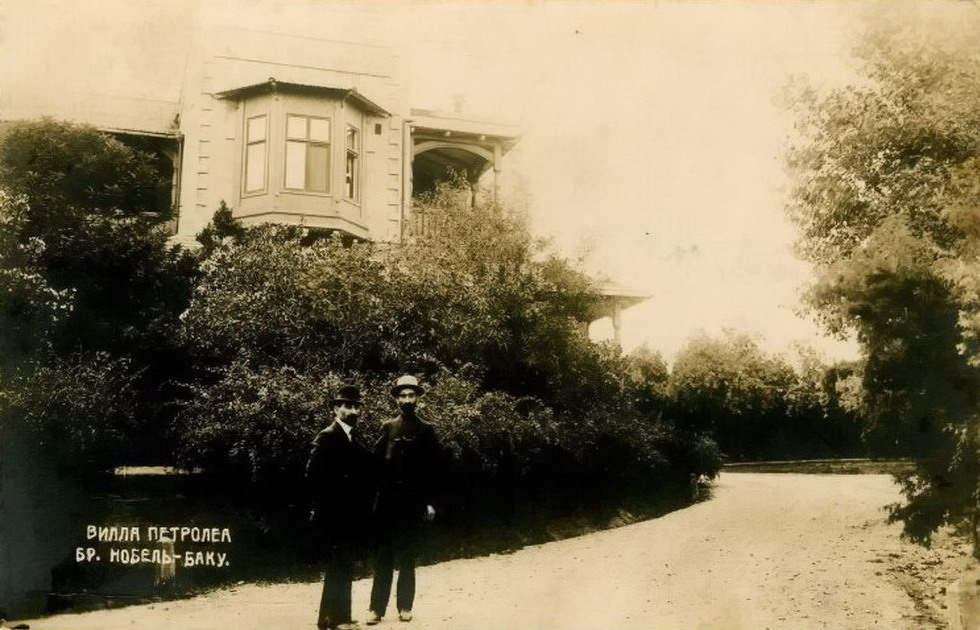
Villa Petrolea garden in 1897

After Beckle got acquainted with the site saturated with oil waste, he demanded the delivery of fertile soil for the park. Soon, barges with fresh soil from the Lankaran district began to moor at the firms dock in the Black City. However, the issue of delivering fresh water for irrigation turned out to be more difficult. Then the Nobel brothers firm ordered to fill the tankers returning from the Astrakhan roadstead with Volga waters as ballast and send them to the Black Citys berths.

Thus, a garden called Villa Petrolea appeared at the junction of the Black and White cities. The gardener E.Beckle studied the natural features of Absheron and paid a special attention to the selection of the tree species for solving the planning and volumetric-spatial structure of the Villa. Beckle picked up the planting material in Lankaran, Tiflis, Batumi and other cities, and also ordered some from nurseries in Russia and Europe.

About 80 000 bushes and trees grew in the Villa's park. Among them, there was a large number of fruit ones. The relief of the area (with a slope towards the sea), the placement of the residential and other buildings, and the choice of the directions of the main alleys determined the underlying planning structure of the Villa Petrolea. Many paths and alleys led to structures, in front of which, areas with flower beds were laid out or trees were grouped. The main alleys went out to viewpoint platforms. From there, it could be seen, through the dense greenery, the factory chimneys of the Black City, and the Caspian Sea.

The name of the master plan's architect of the buildings with typical southern terraces, verandas and balconies, designed in an eclectic spirit using the Romanesque motifs, has not been established. However, the fact that the Villa's master plan, the skilfully executed vertical layout taking into account the terraces and the compositional idea of the park, testify that there was an architect. The Doctor of Architecture Shamil Fatullaev believes that all this was developed by an unnamed architect with the direct participation of Beckle. Such a cooperation was observed in the work of the architect Skurevich and the city gardener Vasiliyev in the process of solving the head part of the coastal boulevard. According to Fatullayev, this "magnificent park in an industrial landscape, located on a vast territory, had a positive impact on the garden and park architecture of Absheron where country villas were created opening a new theme in the architecture of the capitalist Baku".

=== Renaming the park ===
On 9 July 1931, in this Park of Culture and Leisure of the Baku oil workers, an all-Baku meeting of oil shock-workers took place, dedicated to the arrival of the Red Banner "Rote-Fane". The meeting decided to send a telegram to Ernst Thälmann, the leader of the German communists. The park where the meeting took place was named the Rote-Fane Culture and Recreation Park.

In the Rote-Fane culture and recreation park, in the working district of Baku, the 1932 season was opened with a large cycle of concerts by the radio symphony orchestra together with the orchestra of folk instruments.

=== Reconstruction of the park ===
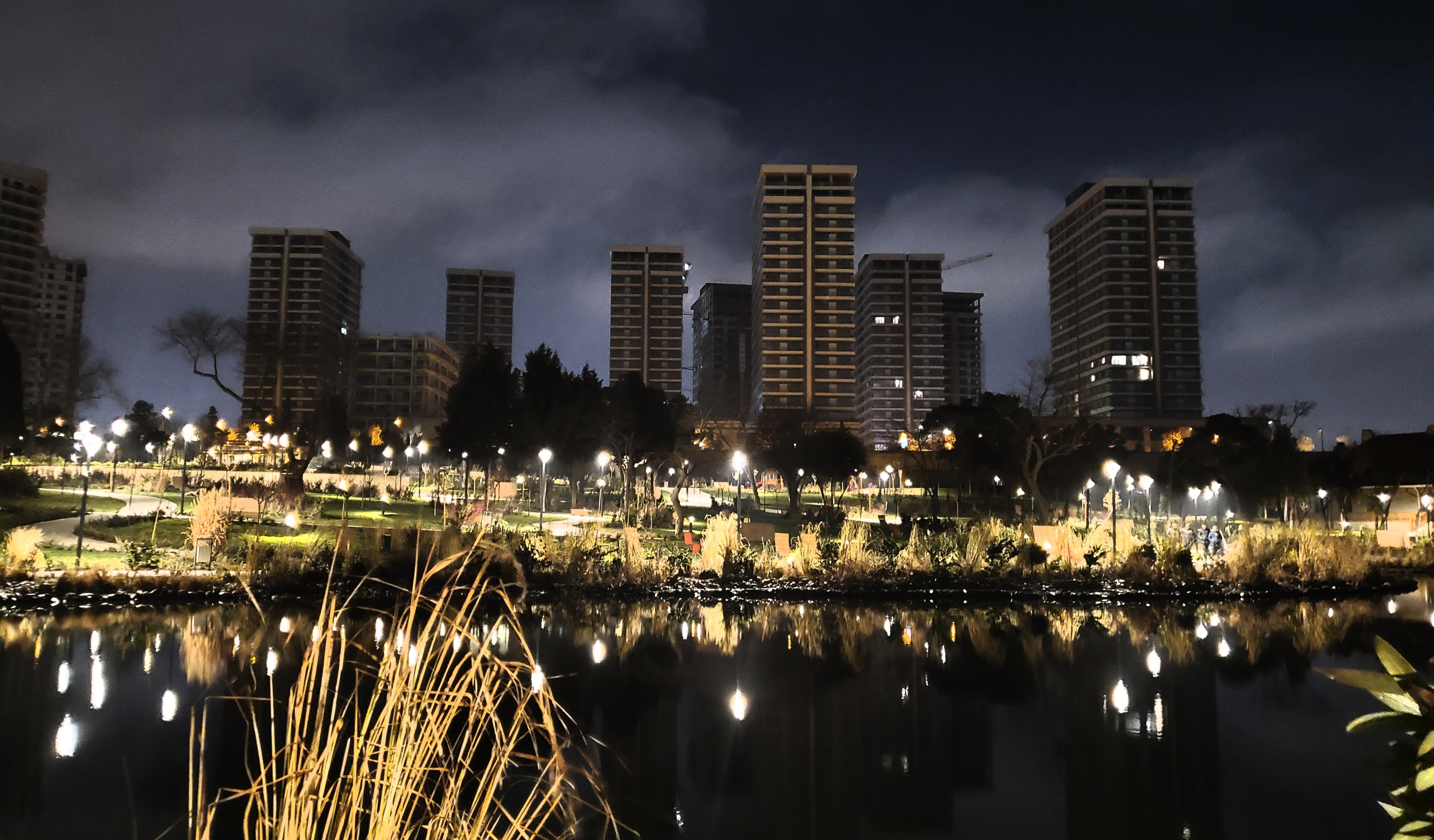
Nizami park after reconstruction 2022

In 1939, the Baku “Rabochiy” newspaper reported that the reconstruction of the park would begin that summer. Thus, the design bureau of the Baksovet Gardens and Parks Administration has begun to develop a project for the reconstruction of the Rote-Fane Park of Culture and Leisure. The authors of the project were the architects - M. Kokhman, V. Ivanov, A. Alekseev. It was reported that the park is expanding, and its territory will grow by 6 hectares, the alleys and paths will be redone being decorated with subtropical and evergreen trees.

A large area was set aside for the "free rest alley" behind the dance floor. It was planned to create a park-forest atmosphere here: trees were planted, lawns were created. In the centre of the park's pool, it was planned to arrange a green island with a fountain and a stage, surrounded by water. It was planned to decorate the park with sculpture. Pavilions and kiosks were transformed. The construction of a sports stadium was also planned in the park. The reconstruction completion was due 1941.

In 2021, it is planned to carry out improvement works on the territory of the park.

== See also ==
- Khagani Garden
- Aliagha Vahid Garden
- Mirza Alakbar Sabir Garden
