= Aliagha Vahid Garden =

Park in Baku, Azerbaijan

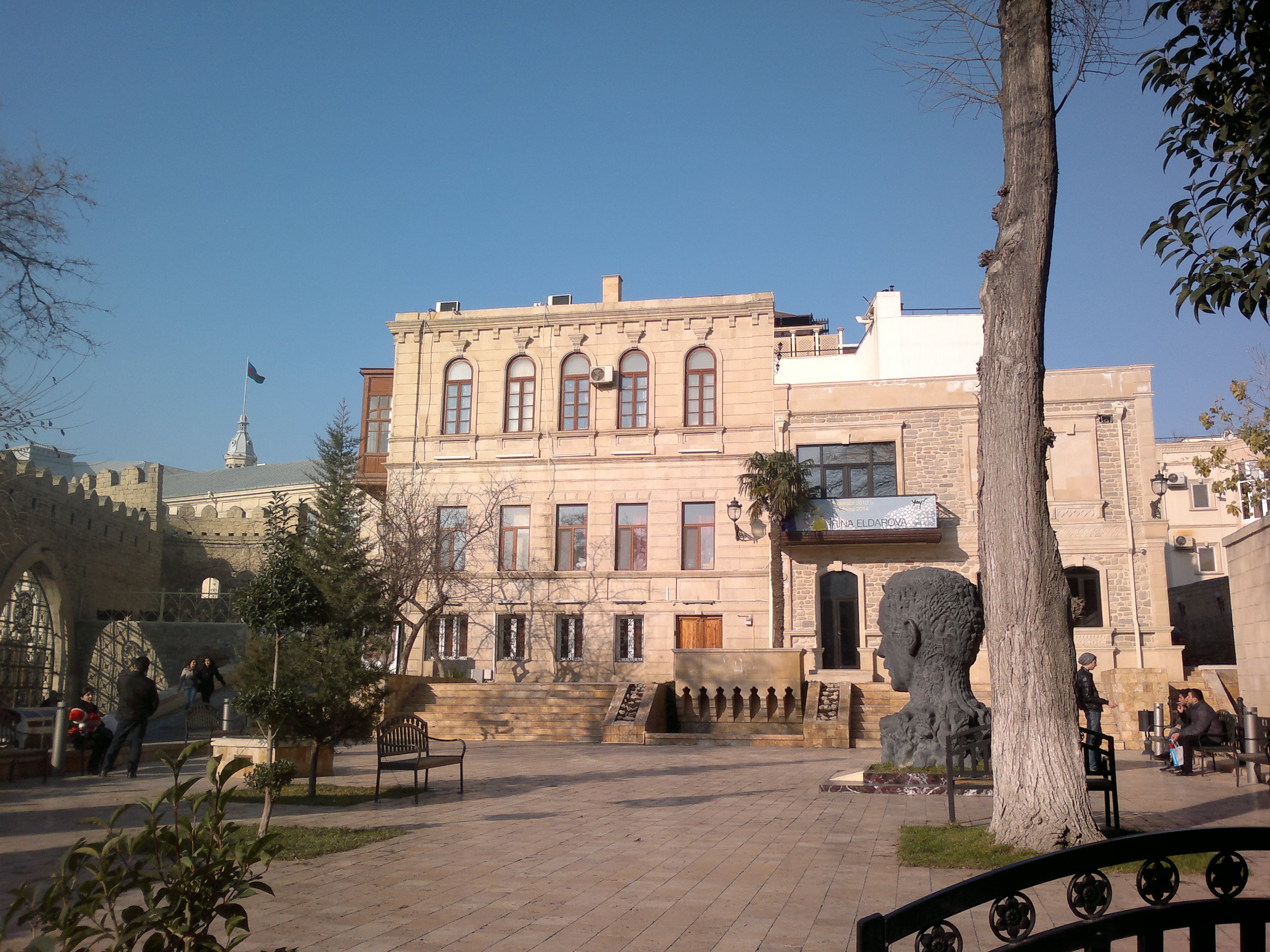

- Location within Baku, Azerbaijan Location within Azerbaijan
- Interactive map of Aliagha Vahid Garden
- Location: Baku Azerbaijan
- Coordinates: 40.3636°N 49.8328°E

Aliagha Vahid Garden (Azerbaijani: Əliağa Vahid bağı) is a small square in the historical Icheri Sheher district of Baku located adjacent to the Kichik Gala street.

== History ==
The name of the garden was anchored to it after the installation of the bust of the classic of Azerbaijani literature, the poet Aliagha Vahid. Initially, in 1990, the bust was installed in the park, formerly known as the Mikhailovsky or Governors Garden, one of the oldest parks in Baku. On the south side, the square of that garden was bordered by Niyazi Street, on the north side - by the Icheri Sheher metro station, on the west - by the Istiglaliyat Street, and on the east - by the fortress wall of the old part of Icheri Sheher.

In 2009, the bust was moved to Icheri Sheher, and the former Governor's Garden began to bear the name "Philharmonic Garden" after the Baku Philharmonic Society being located in it, the name "Aliagha Vahid Garden" was assigned to the new place.

== Sights ==
- YAY! Gallery
- Chin Mosque (numismatic exhibition opened)
