= Takya (disambiguation) =

A takya or takiyya is a Sufi lodge, especially in the Ottoman Empire, in pre-Safavid Iran and in South Asia.

Takya or takiyya may also refer to:

- in South Asia, a cemetery for Sufis
- in Iran since the Safavids, a takyeh
- in the modern Arab world, a soup kitchen
- Takya (Old City, Baku), a historical monument in Baku, Azerbaijan
- Təkyə, a village in Azerbaijan
- Takya, Kurdistan Region, a village in Kurdistan Region, Iraq
- taqiyya, dissimulation in Islam
