= List of parks in Baku =

Baku, Azerbaijan has a variety of parks located in various parts of the capital and in the suburbs of the Absheron Peninsula. The following is an incomplete list.

Park	Description	Photograph
Baku Boulevard	The Baku Seaside Park (known mostly as The Boulevard) is located in the center of the capital of Azerbaijan. The park was founded in 1909. In 2014, a Ferris wheel was added to the park.	
Fountains Square, Baku	The Fountains Square is the first urban square of Baku and includes several fountains and monuments from the 1800s.	
Khagani Garden	Established in the 1870s to beautify the malakanka farmers' market, operated by Spiritual Christians, outside the boundary of the Old City, and officially named "Mariinsky" after the wife of Tsar Alexander II of Russia. During Soviet renamed to "9 January" in memory of the Bloody Sunday (1905) demonstrations in Moscow. In the 1990s, the Khagani Trade Center was built across the street, and the park renamed after the poet Khagani Shirvani (1120-1194). Today, the Old Azeri name persists as the most common colloquial: Malakanka, or Molokanka in Russian.	
Philharmonic Garden	The Philharmonic Garden is located in front of the former residence of the governor of Baku, and is therefore often called Governor's House.	
Upland Park	The Upland Park is situated adjacent to the city square and stretches alongside the Seaside Park. The park was built by the architect Lev Ilyin from local materials.	
Izmir Garden	The Izmir Park has long been widely called Firefighter's Garden, because of its location next to the city's fire brigade. The city of Izmir after which the park was named, is one of the twin cities of Baku.	
Aliagha Vahid Garden	This garden is located behind the metro station Icherisheher and surrounded by historical buildings of the Old City. The bust of Aliagha Vahid was formerly located in the Philharmonic Garden, but was relocated to this park in 2008.	
Officers Park	The park was founded during World War II in memory of Azerbaijan citizens and soldiers.	
Dede Gorgud Park	This park is named after a monument to the epic story Book of Dede Korkut made by the sculptor and artist Gerush Babayev.	
Sabir Square	This is one of the central squares of Baku and it faces the fortress wall of Old City to the southern side and borders with the Istiglaliyyat Street to the north. The square was established in 1920 and in 1922 the monument to Mirza Alakbar Sabir was created.	
Central Botanical Garden	Central Botanical Garden was founded in the year of 1935, sponsored by the Institute of Botany. The territory of the park is 16 hectares and houses different trees, plants in both open and closed areas.	
Mardakan Arboretum	This arboretum, located in Mardakan on the corner of the Absheron peninsula, was formerly privately owned; the park was purchased and publicly opened in 1920.	
