= Dede Gorgud Park =

Park in Baku, Azerbaijan

Coordinates: 40°23′33″N 49°50′49″E

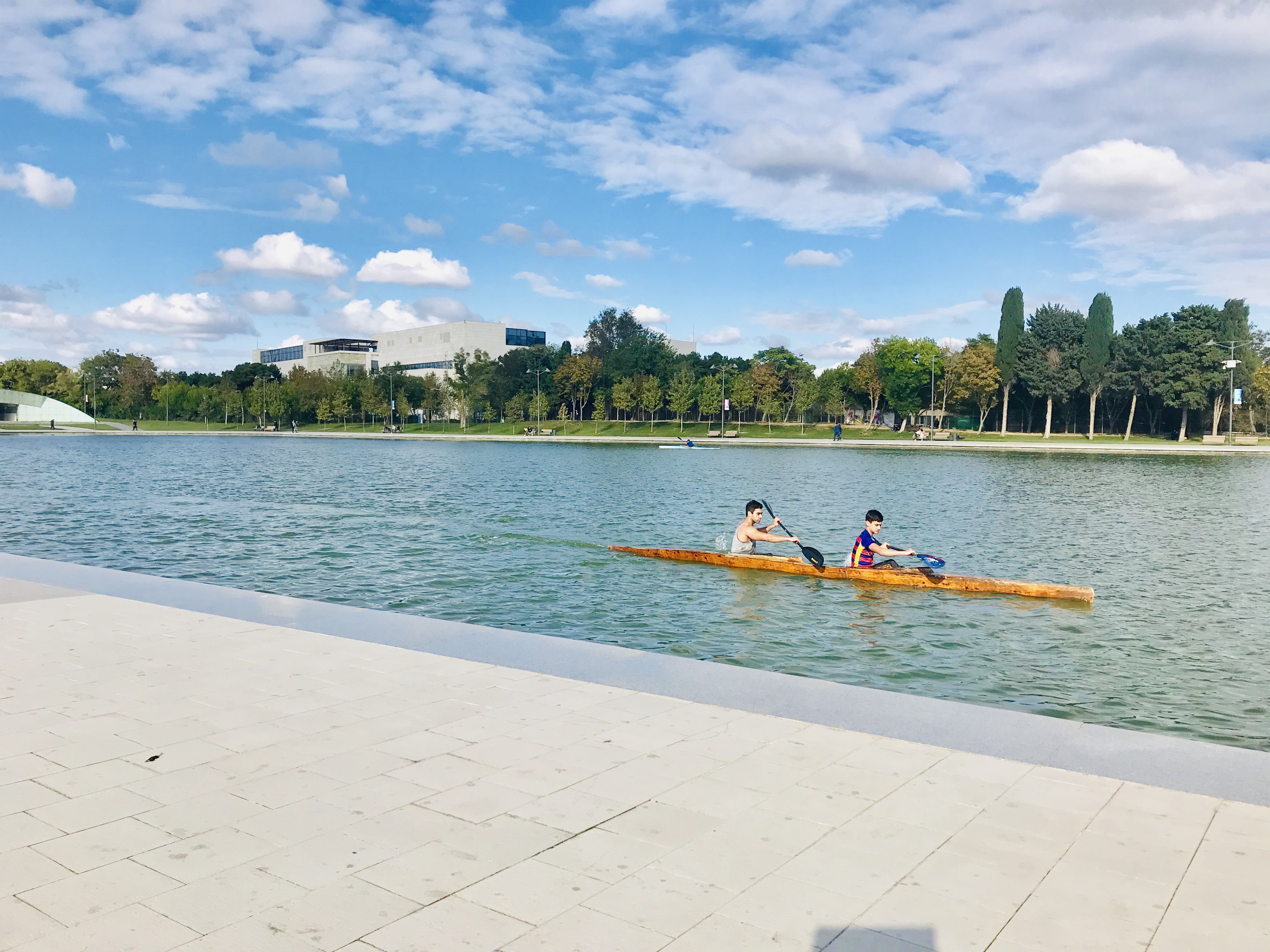
Dede Gorgud Park in 2018.

The Dede Gorgud Park (Azerbaijani: Dədə Qorqud Parkı) is a park in Baku, Azerbaijan. The park is located in the Narimanov district. It was opened on 13 December 2013. The park was opened on the site of a former children's railway.

The park is the second-largest park in Baku, second only to the Baku Seaside Park. The total area of the park is 6 hectares, in the center there is a two hectare artificial lake, which is accompanied by an underground reserve. In the park itself there is a monument dedicated to Dastan Kitabi Dede Gorgud. This monument was created by the sculptor Göyüs Babayev.

== See also ==
- List of parks in Baku
