= Takya (Old City, Baku) =

- Azerbaijani: Təkiyə; Persian: تکیا
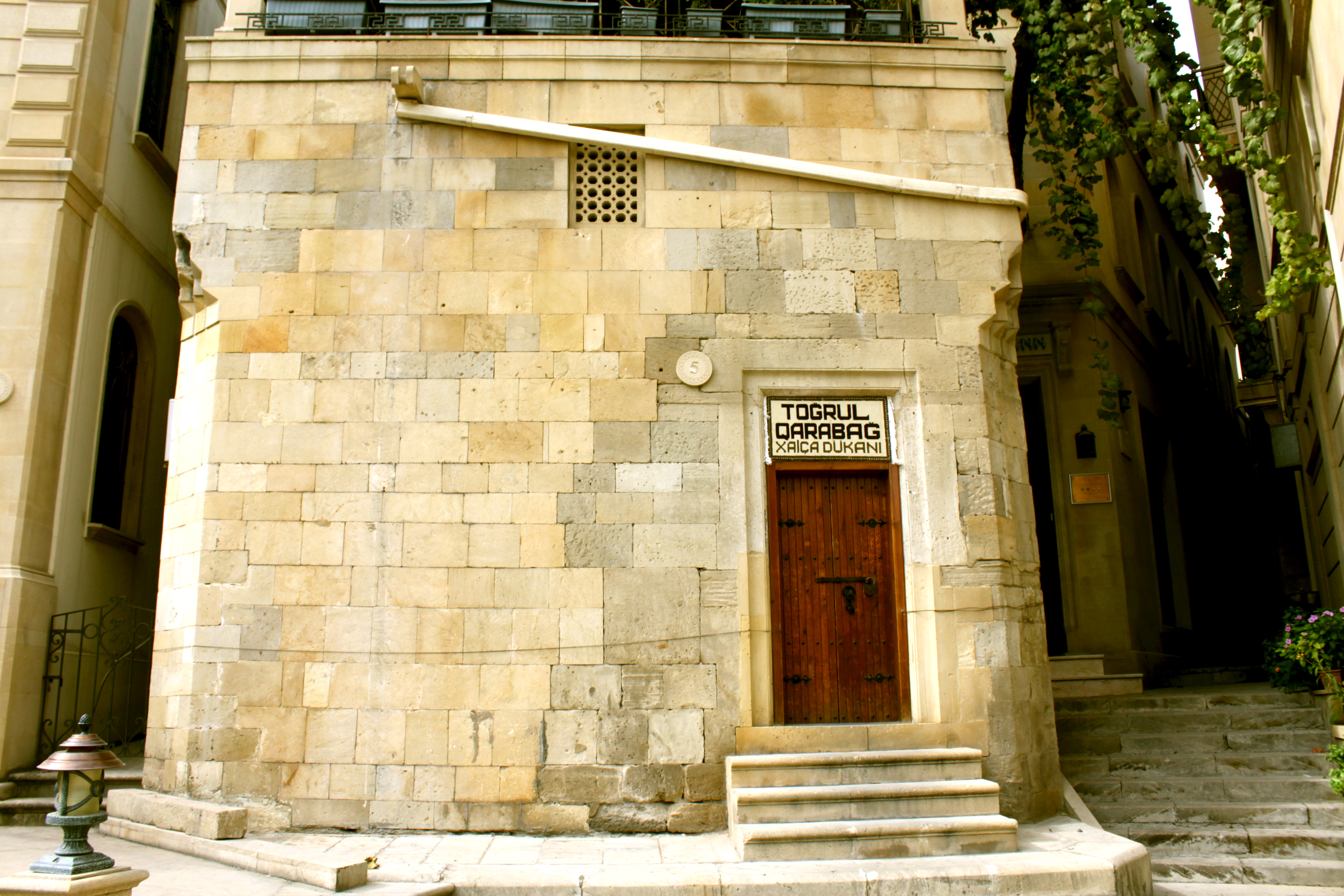

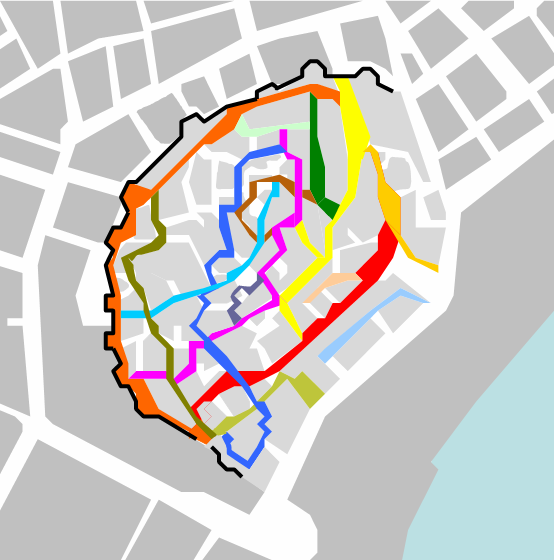
- Location in the Baku Old City

Religion
- Affiliation: Islam
- Status: restored

Location
- Location: Old City, Baku
- Country: Azerbaijan
- Interactive map of Takya
- Coordinates: 40.366872°N 49.836581°E

Architecture
- Style: Islamic architecture, Shirvan-Absheron architectural school
- Completed: XIII century

Takya (Azerbaijani: Təkiyə, Persian: تکیا) is a historical monument of the 13th century by the Iranian Shirvanshahs. It is a part of Old City and located on Gazi Muhammed street, in the city of Baku, in Azerbaijan. The building was also registered as a national architectural monument by the decision of the Cabinet of Ministers of the Republic of Azerbaijan dated August 2, 2001, No. 132.

== History ==
The monument was built in XIII century. It mainly operated as mahallah mosque, and also as secondary school. In 1967, archeological excavations were conducted around the takya. It was restored in 1970s.

Dervishes were spiritually purified, performing individual and mass religious rituals here. Takyas were also a shelter for traveling strangers.

== Architectural features ==
The monument is square-shaped and consists of a single room. Its facade is towards the Maiden Tower. Unusual plan of the takya, as well as covering of the worshipping room with stepped domes system resulted with specificity of the interior of the monument.

== Gallery ==
Different views of the monument

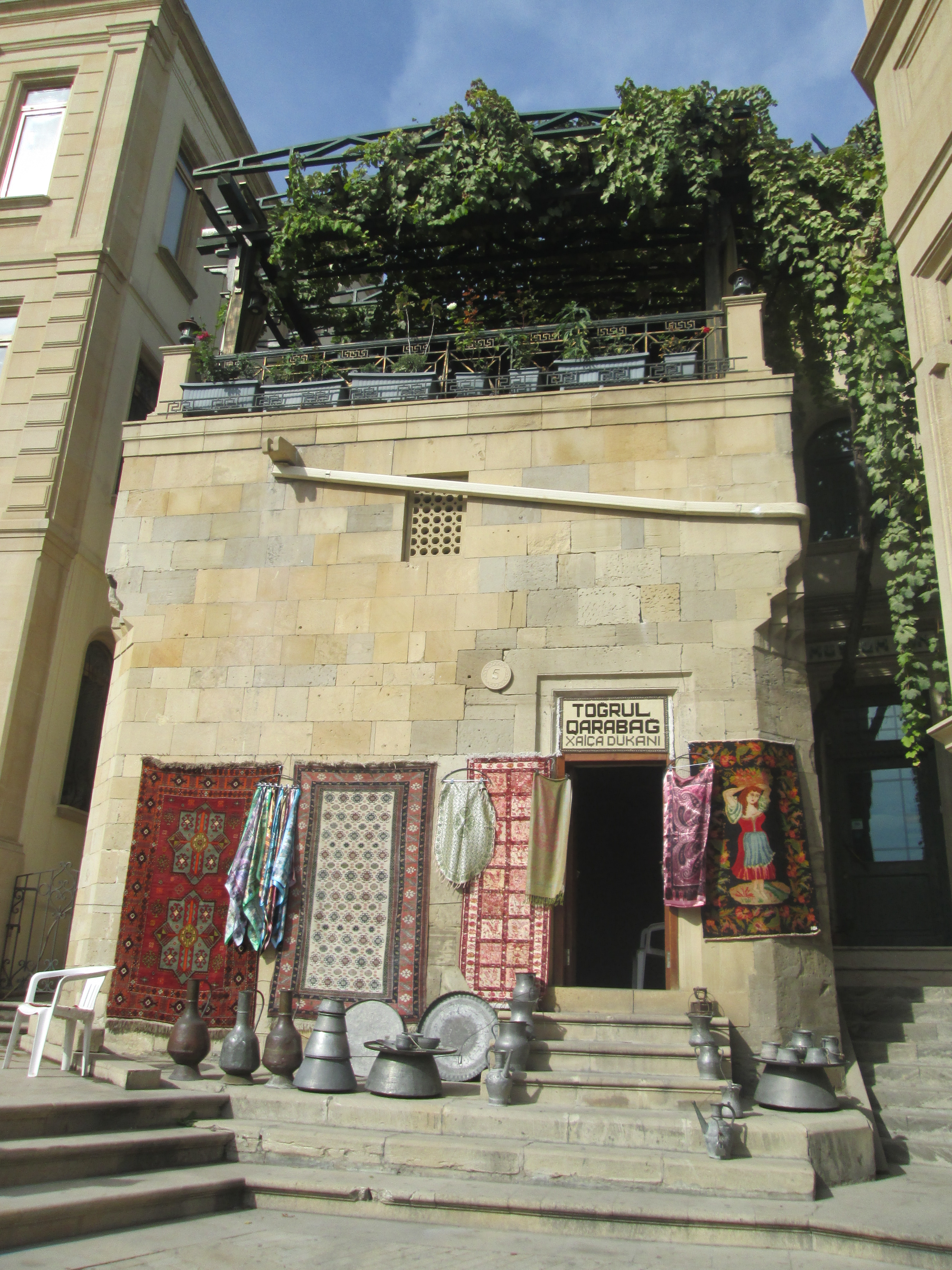

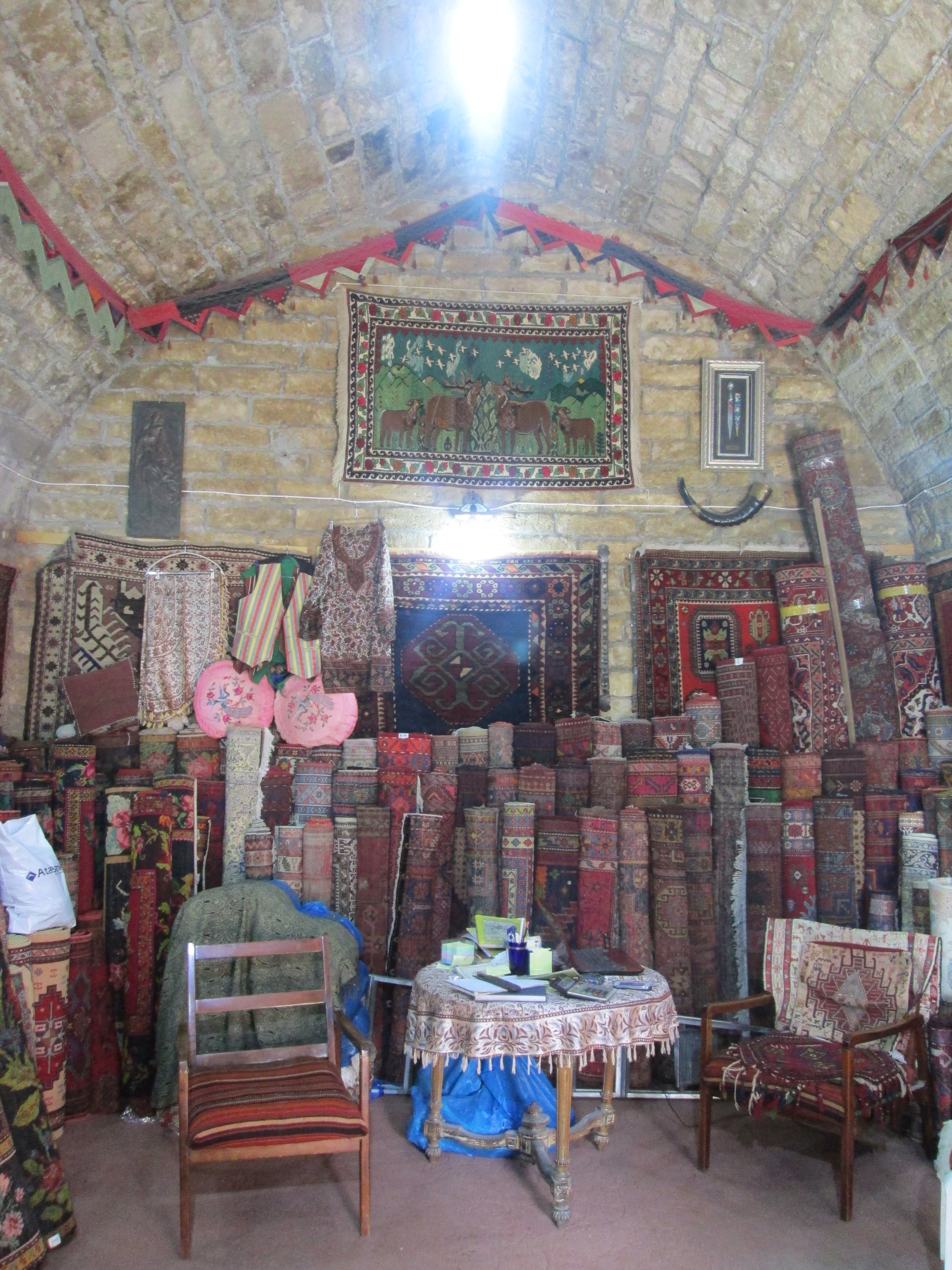

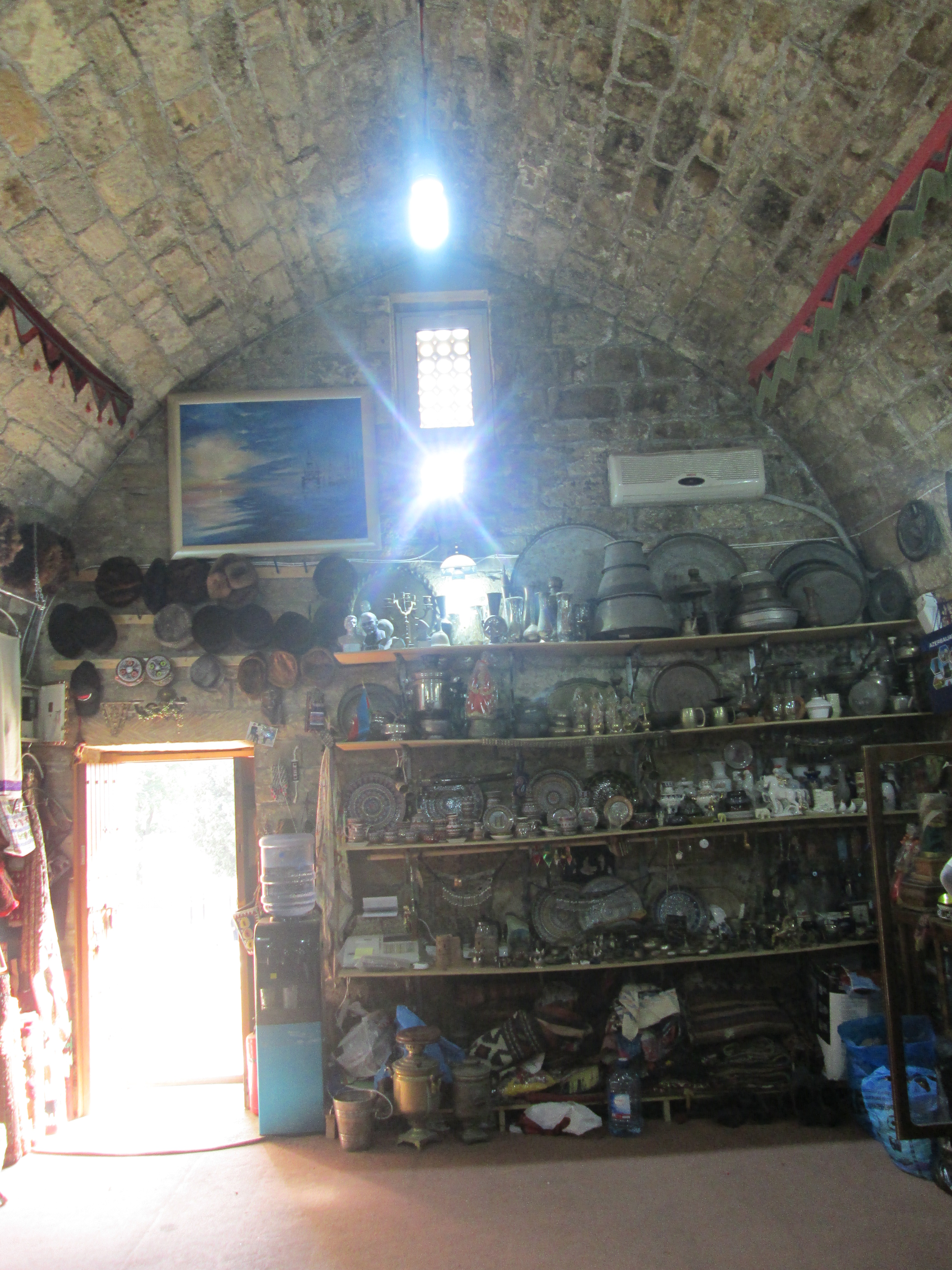

== See also ==
- Gileyli Mosque
- Jinn Mosque
- Chin Mosque
- Sheikh Ibrahim Mosque
- Sayyid Yahya Murtuza Mosque
- Haji Heybat Mosque
