= Villa Petrolea =

Historical district in Baku, Azerbaijan

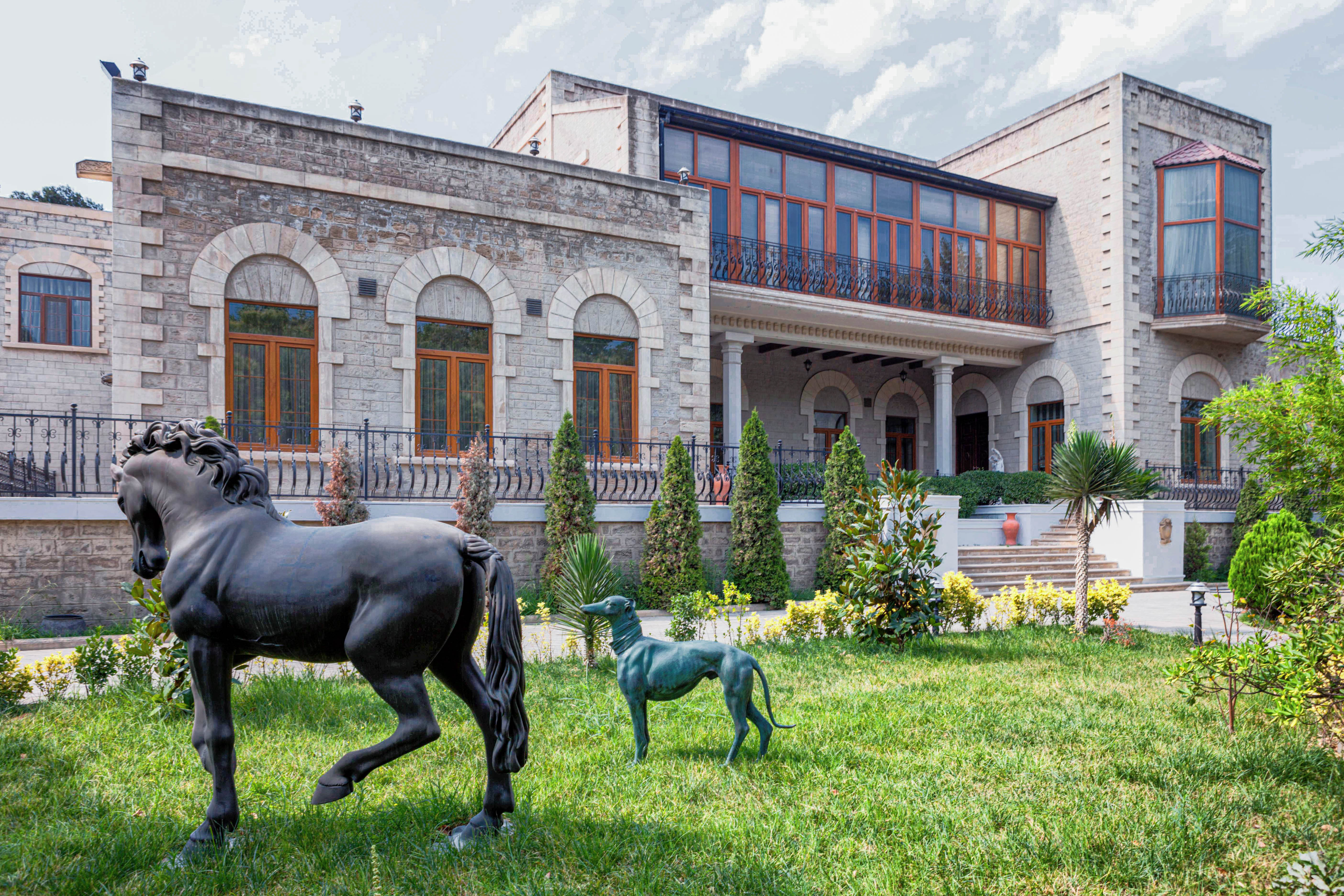
- Museum of Nobel Brothers
- Established: 1884
- Location: Baku, Azerbaijan
- Coordinates: 40.380°N 49.894°E

Villa Petrolea is a historical district located in the Keshla municipality of Baku, Azerbaijan. Built by the Petroleum Production Company Nobel Brothers (also known as Branobel) in 1882, it served to accommodate workers of the company. It currently functions as a museum of the Nobel brothers, in addition to housing a number of offices and businesses.

== History ==
By the end of the nineteenth century, eastern parts of Baku (then the main oil extraction centre of the Russian Empire) constituted an industrial region unsuitable for civil residence due to heavy pollution. The only structures were oil refineries, port buildings and temporary housing for oil workers. In order to get the administrative and technical personnel of Branobel (including specialists from Sweden, Norway and Germany) to settle in this area, a settlement providing favourable living conditions was built here. It was located on the eastern end of the industrial Black City neighbourhood, near the village of Keshla. It was built on the land rented by Branobel from the Keshla farmers for 49 years.

The territory of the settlement named Villa Petrolea (Latin for "oil estate") included residential buildings, a Swedish-German school, a theatre, a hospital and a family mansion of the Nobel family completed in 1884 and designed by an unknown architect. The mansion remained in the Nobels' possession until nationalization in the 1920s.

Branobel employees lived in one- or two-story wooden cottages with stone foundations. The lower levels of the largest building housed the office, whereas the top levels included a club, relaxation rooms and a library. The rooms were decorated with rich carpets, both woven locally and imported from Persia. The cottages were located on a slope descending to the Caspian shore, therefore the window of each cottage overlooked the sea. The buildings were built in the Byzantine style. The settlement grew as more recreational facilities, such as a bowling hall, a pool hall and a tennis court, were built here in the 1890s. By the 1911, the residents had established numerous performance and athletic clubs.

The life in Villa Petrolea went into decline at the advent of World War I when German and Austro-Hungarian nationals were expelled from the Russian Empire. The settlement was nationalized in 1919.

=== The park ===
The Villa Petrolea park had an area of 10.5 hectares and designed by landscape architects from Poland. The oil-saturated earth was covered by fertile soil shipped from Lankaran, the subtropical part of Azerbaijan. The problem of fresh water was solved by constantly importing water from the Volga on ships travelling from Astrakhan which used it as ballast instead of sacks of sand.

Plants were brought from the subtropical parts of the Caucasus, as well as from various cities across Russia and Europe. In total, about 80,000 plants, including fruit trees, were planted in the garden.

After the establishment of the Soviet rule, the park was expanded to 15 hectares, and in 1931 it was named Rote Fahne (German for "Red Banner") which marked the handing over of the Transferable Red Banner from the oil workers of Baku to the Berlin proletariat in 1925. In 1941, due to the Nazi attack on the Soviet Union, the park was renamed Nizami Park, which name it carries to this day.

== Modern state ==
=== Reconstruction of the Nobel mansion ===
In the Soviet times, the buildings fell in disuse. Their living quarters were demolished, while the theatre and the club were destroyed in a fire. The mansion was largely neglected prior to the 2000s. In 2004, a public organization named the Baku Nobel Heritage Fund was established. Under its leadership, the Nobel mansion was completely restored and renovated. On 25 April 2008, it opened its doors for its first visitors.

=== Museum ===
After the reconstruction, Villa Petrolea has been housing the Baku Nobel Oil Club, the International Conference Hall and the Nobel Brothers Museum, the first Nobel museum outside Sweden. The museum contains possessions of the Nobel family. Even though the interior of the mansion is not completely the same as it was prior to the departure of the family from Baku, some elements, such as fireplaces, were very precisely recreated.

== Major events ==
On 9 October 1888, Emperor Alexander III of Russia visited Villa Petrolea with his family, where he met the children of the recently deceased Ludvig Nobel, one of the founders of the settlement.

On 17 December 2010, Ludvig Nobel's great-grandson Filip Nobel organized a special event marking the establishment of the Nobel International Fraternity Fund aimed at the development of sciences in Azerbaijan.

== Gallery ==
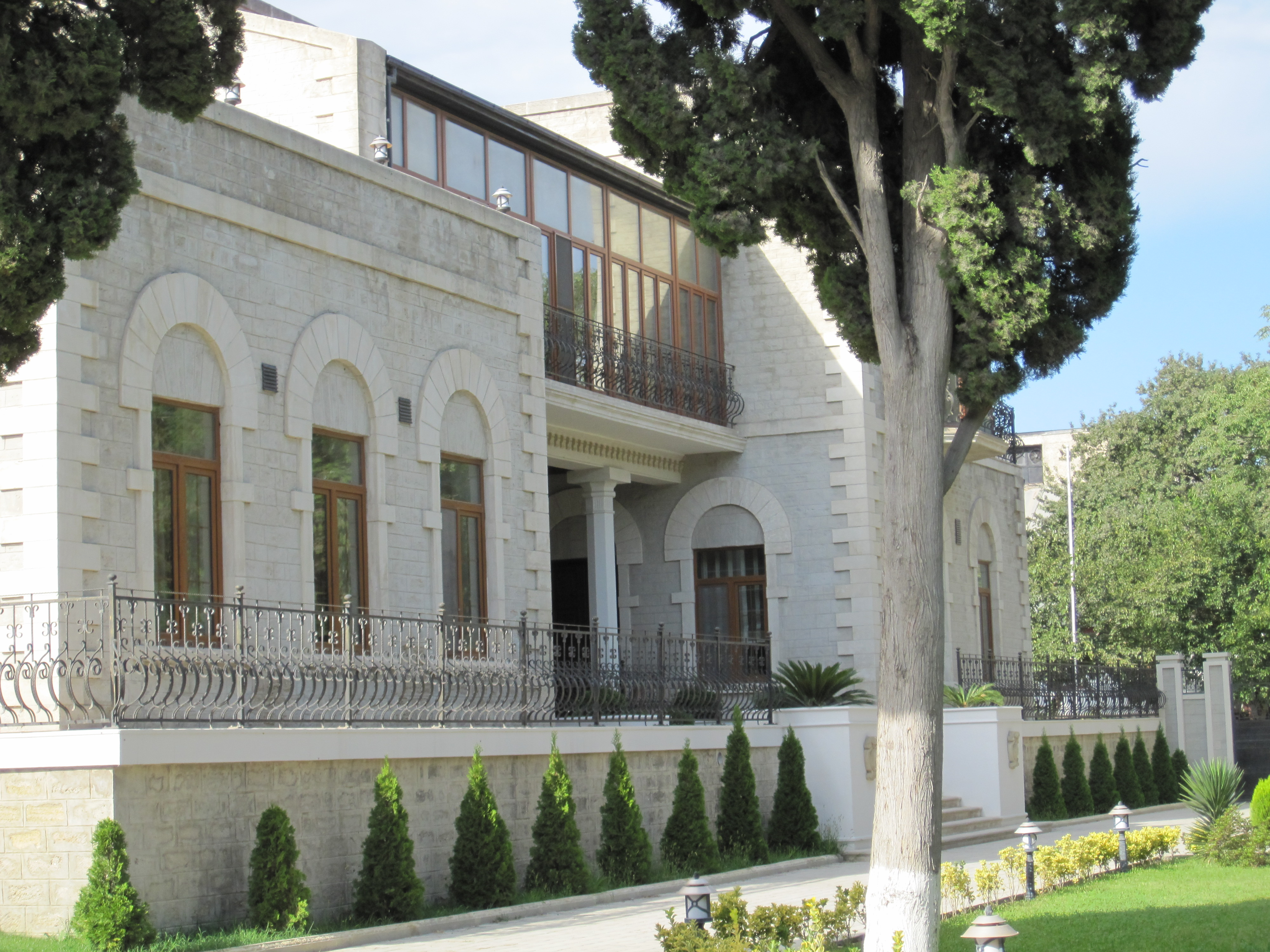
Back side of the Museum of Nobel Brothers

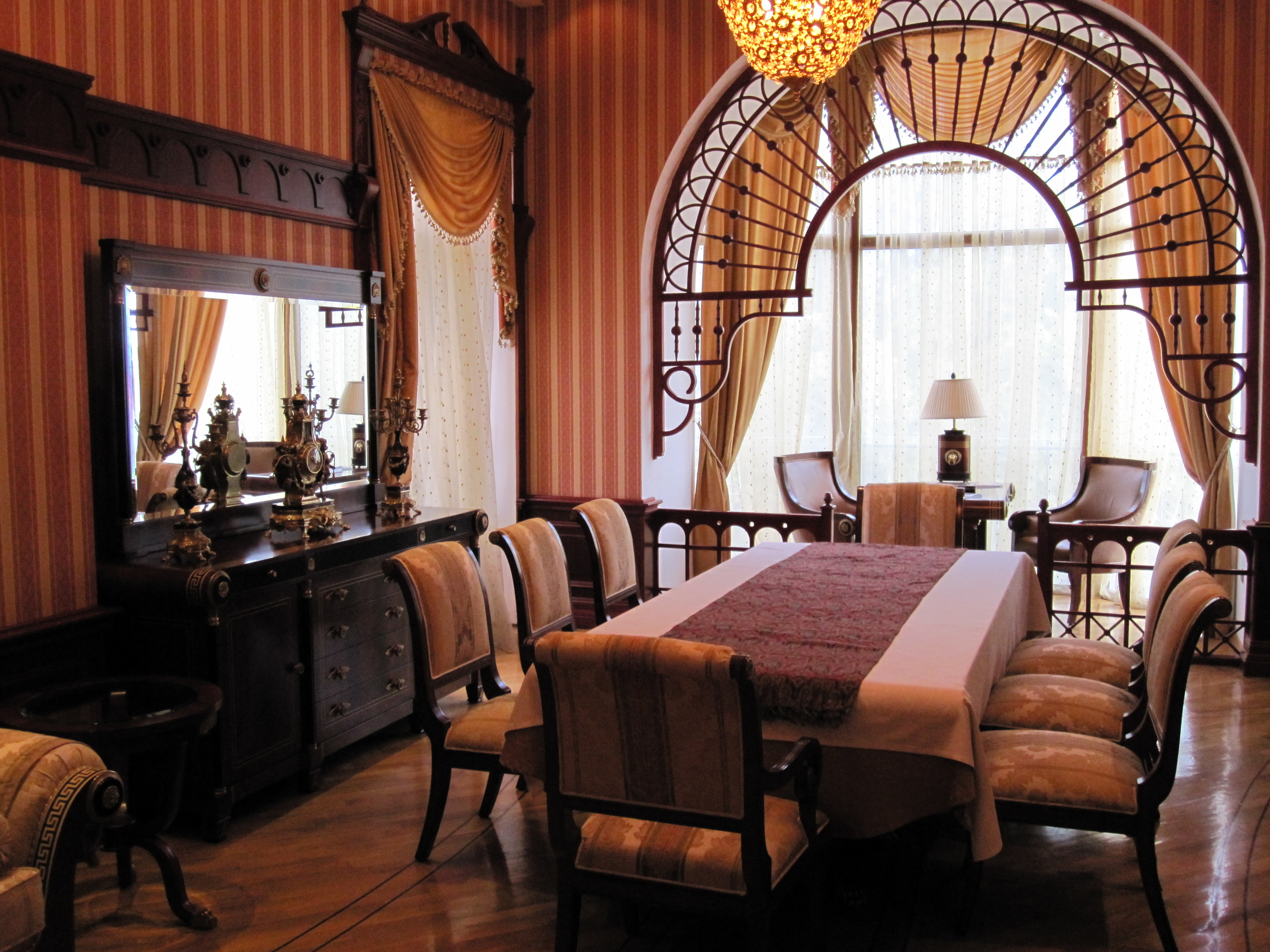
The museum's dining room

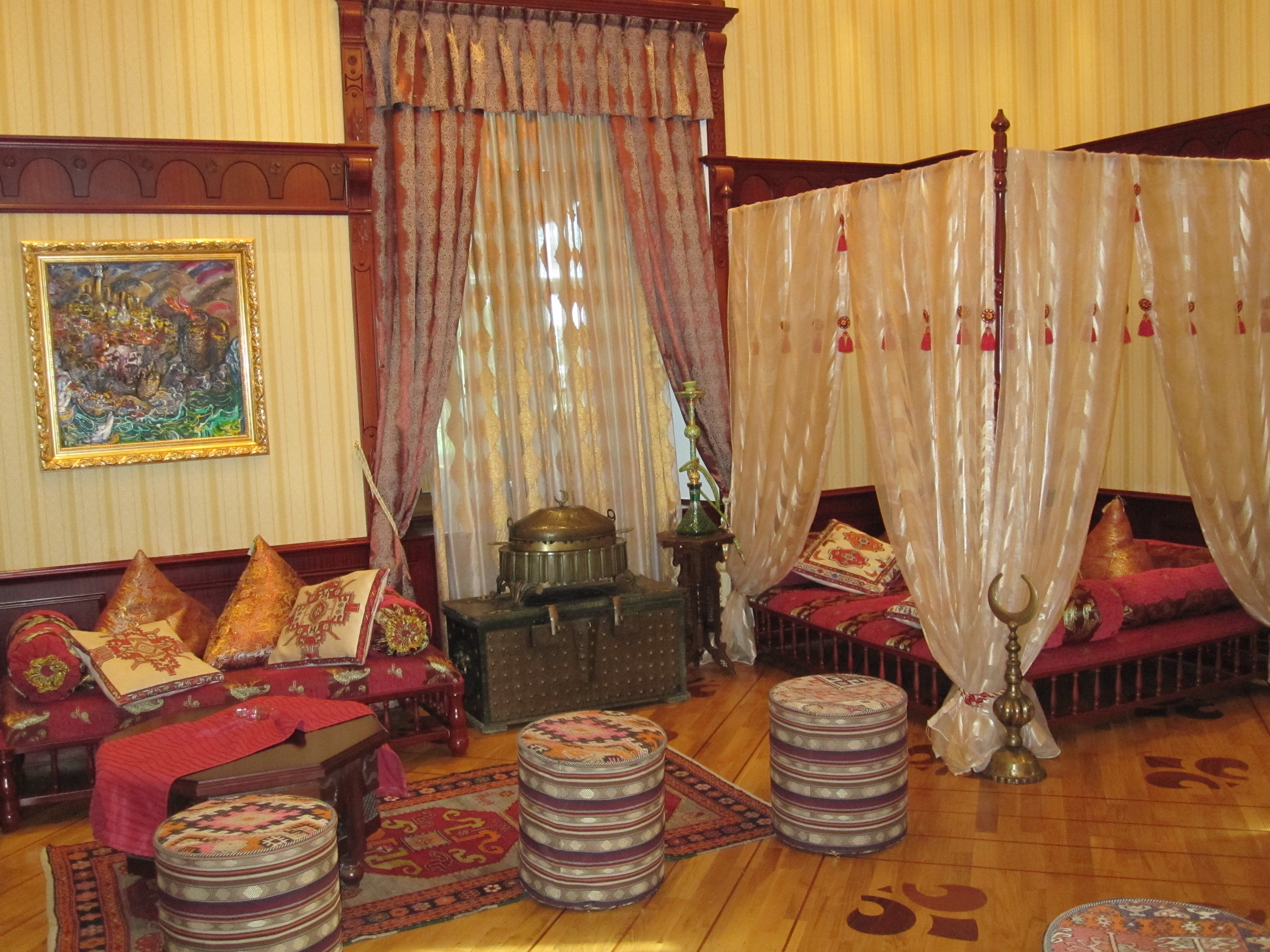
The museum's Oriental room
