= Xətai raion =

Xətai
- Raion
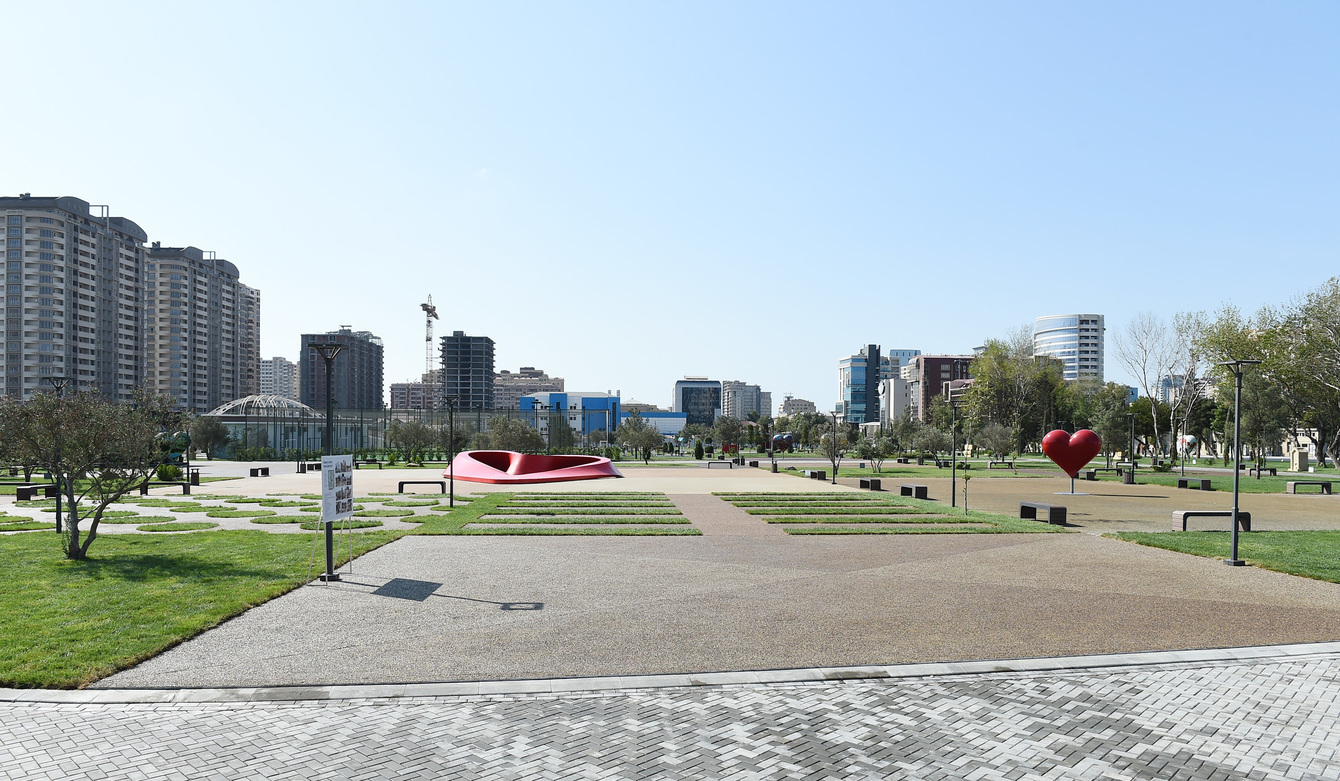
- Khatai District

- Location within Azerbaijan
- Coordinates: 40°23′N 49°52′E
- Country: Azerbaijan
- District: Baku

Population (2010)
  - Total: 289,900
- Time zone: UTC+4 (AZT)
  - Summer (DST): UTC+4 (AZT)

Xətai District is a raion in Baku, Azerbaijan. It contains the Əhmədli municipality.

== Transport ==
Khatai Metro Station is located in the area.

== Gallery ==
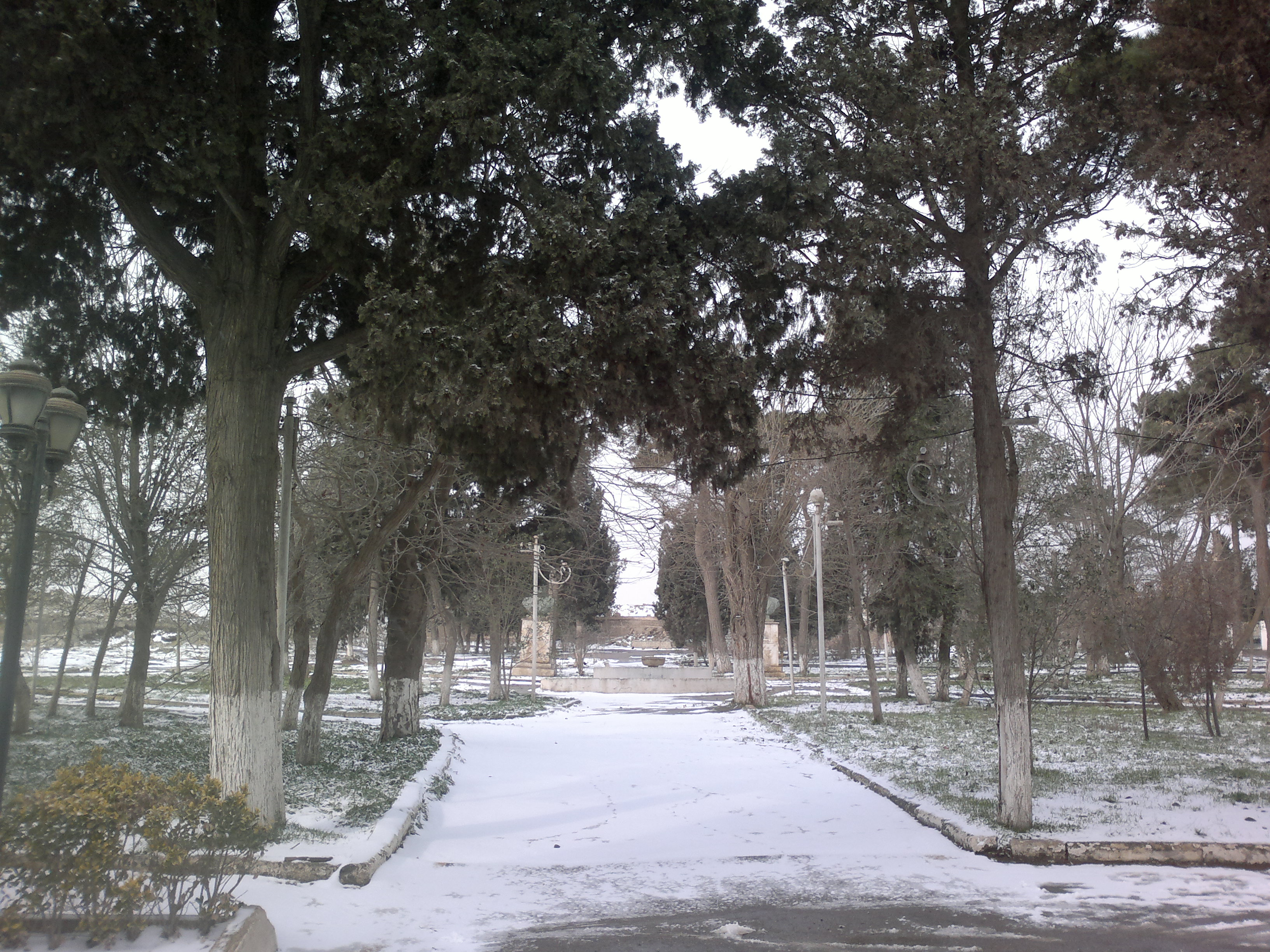
Nizami park

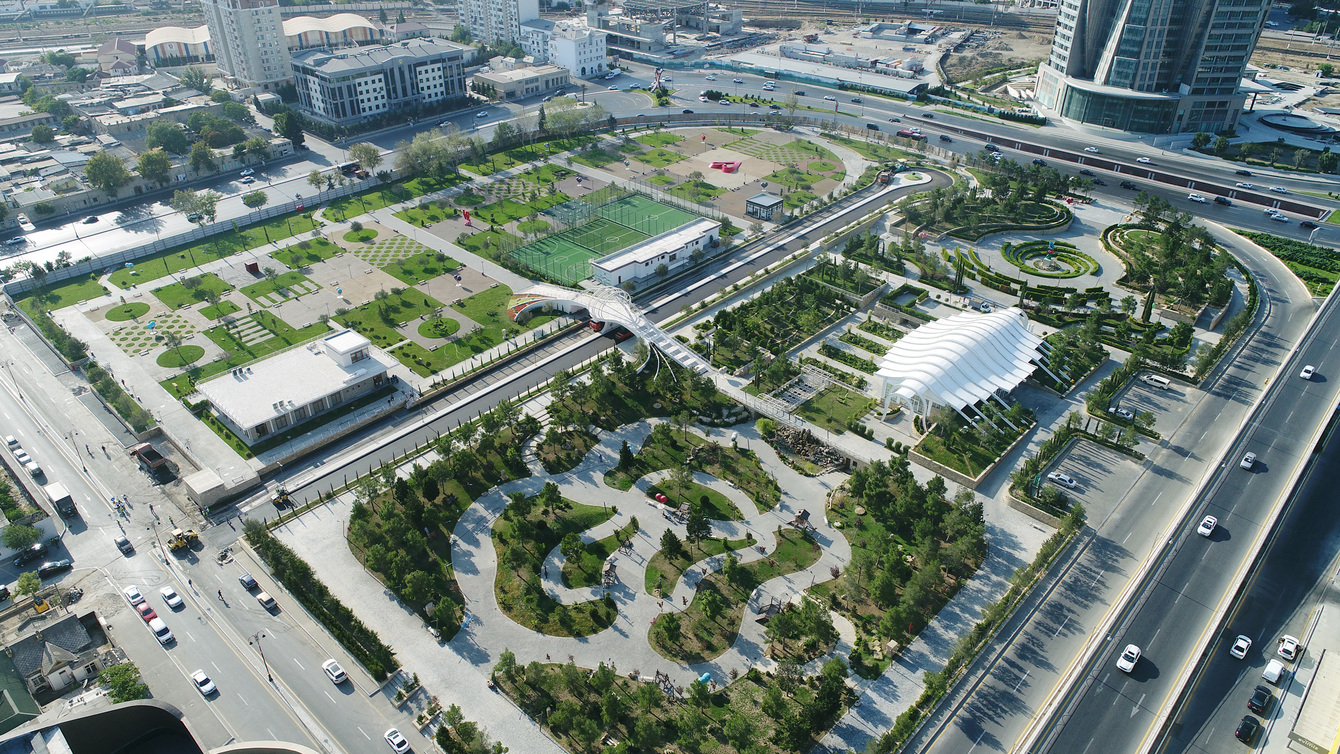
Sports and amusement park in Khatai district

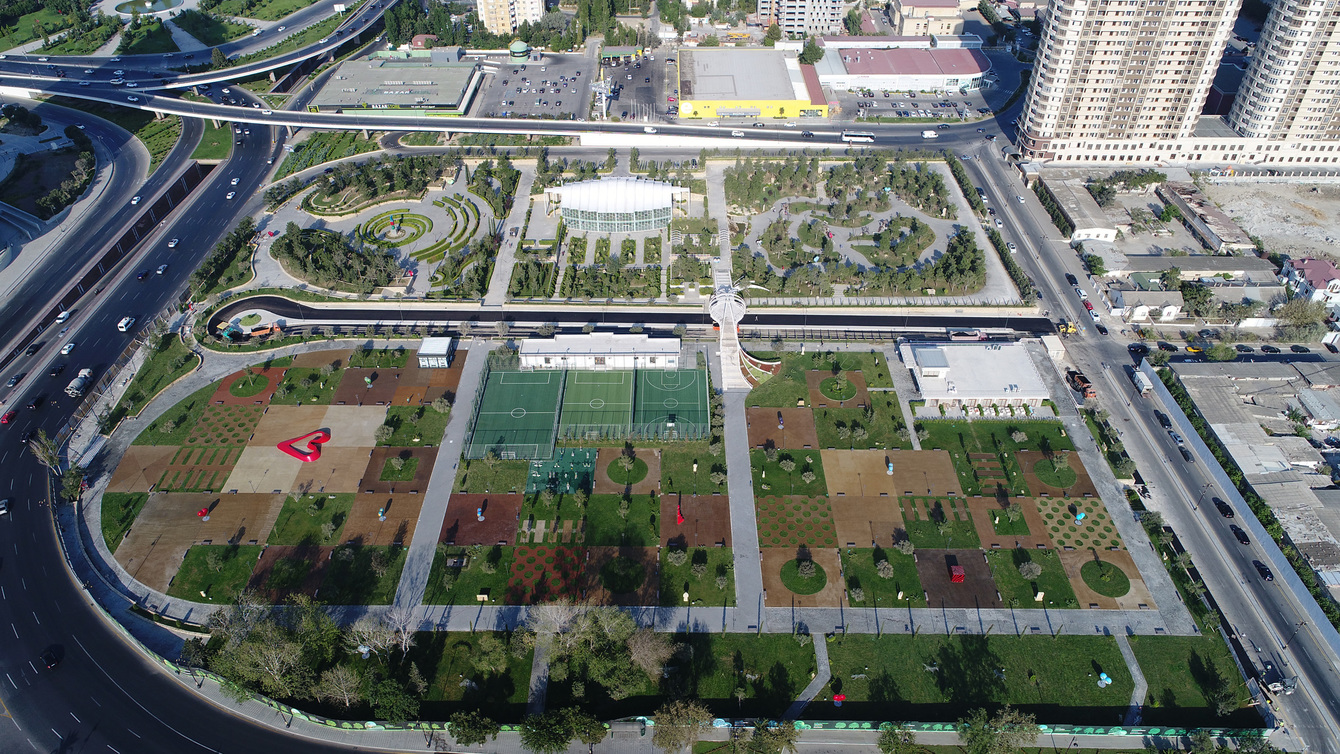
Park in Khatai district

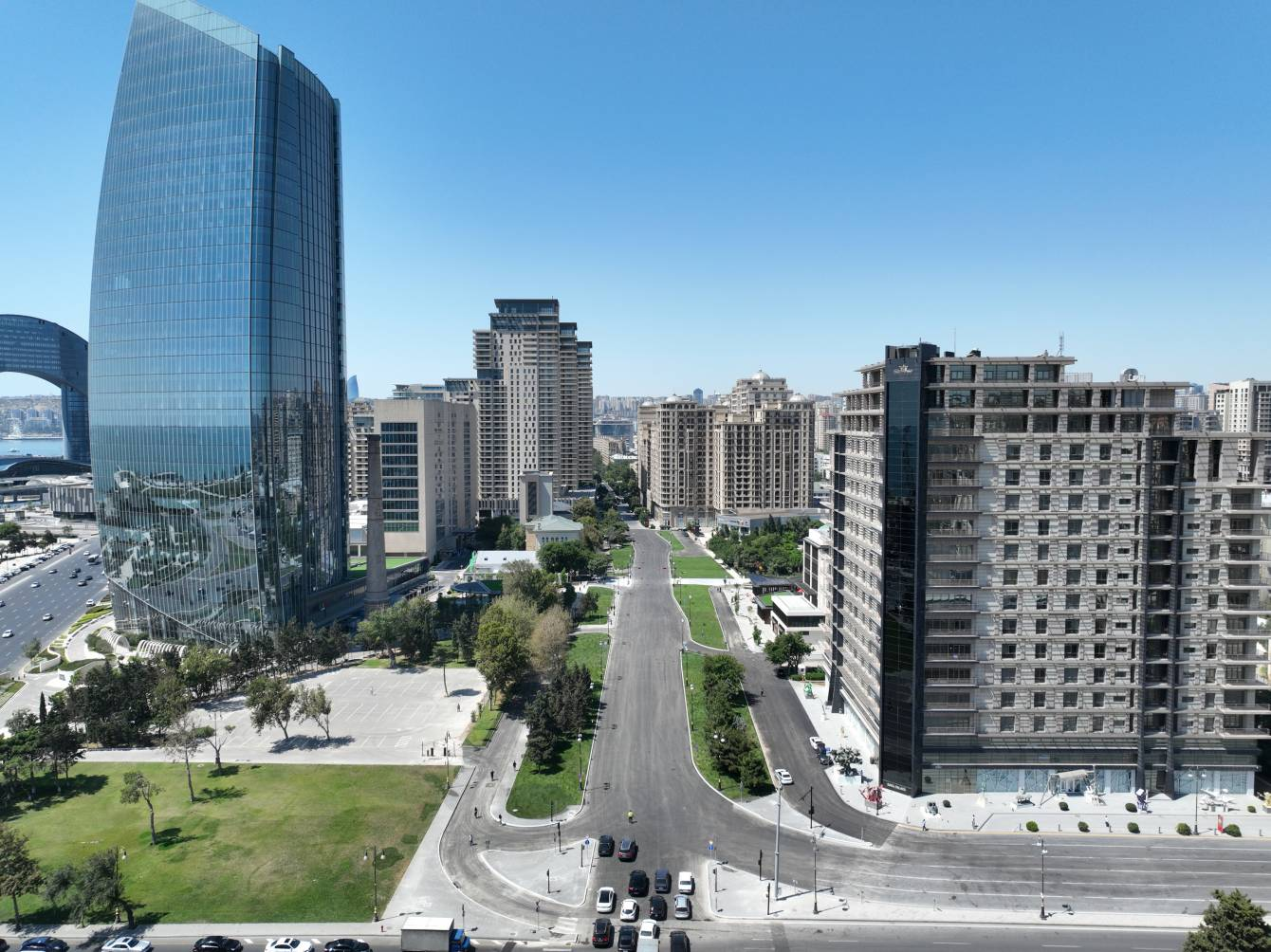
Khatai District
