= Philharmonic Garden =

Park in Baku, Azerbaijan

Coordinates: 40.363735°N 49.832946°E

Filarmonia Park
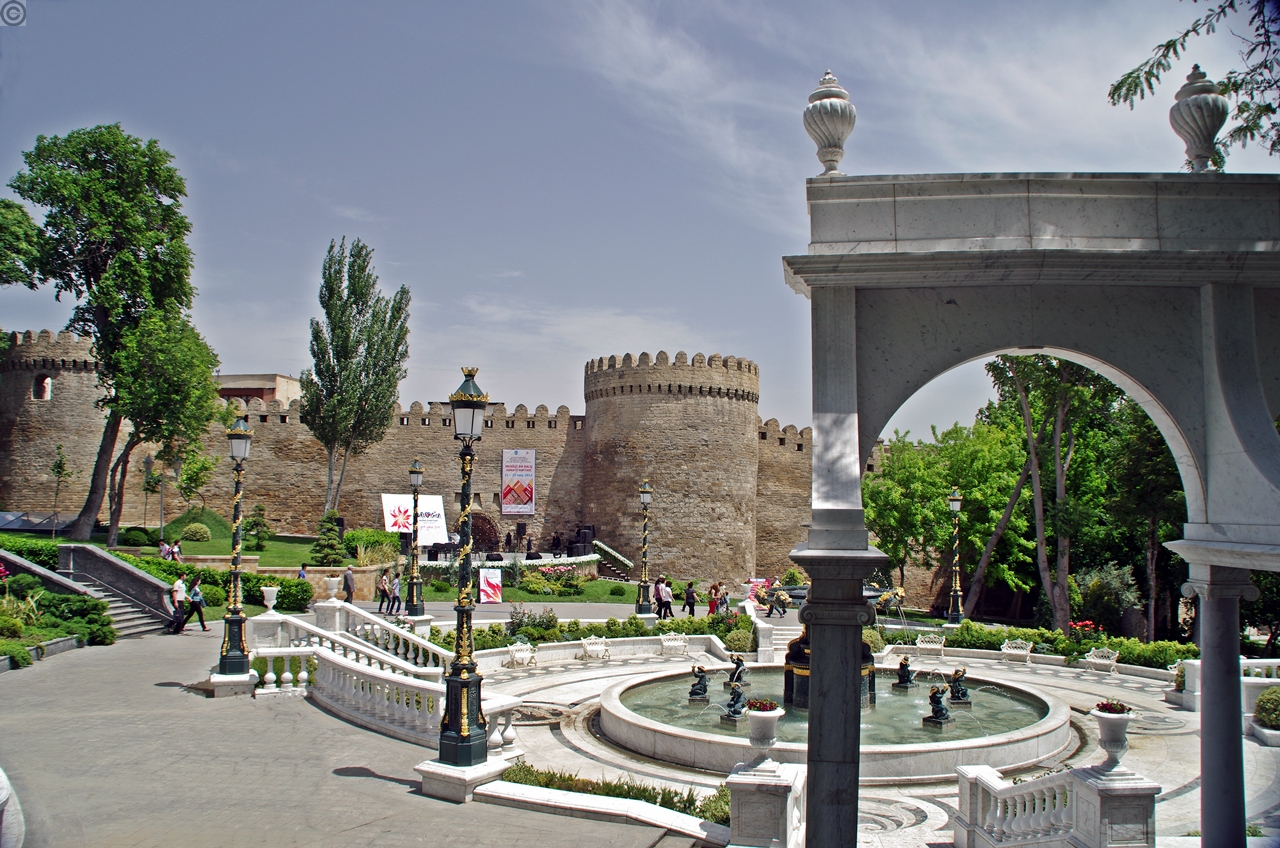
- Interactive map of Filarmonia Park
- Location: Baku

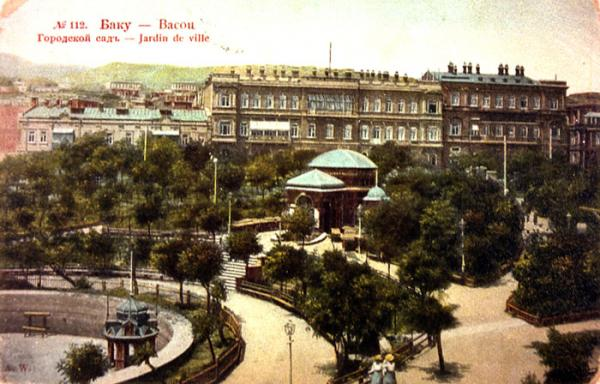
Early 20th-century postcard view

Filarmoniya Bağı (Filarmonia Park or Philharmonia Garden), sometimes called Gubernator's or Governor's Park, is a park in Baku, Azerbaijan, next to Baku fortress.

The park was established beginning in 1830; ship's captains coming from Iran were asked to bring a sack of soil to add to it. It was extended in the 1860s and 1870s to 4.6 hectares (11 acres) and originally called Mixaylov bağı, Mikhaelovsky Garden, after the governor. In the early 20th century, there were plans to create a concert hall in the park, but the necessary felling of trees led to objections. A summer pavilion was built. The park was renovated in the 1970s and then further renovated beginning in 2007 on orders of President Ilham Aliyev. An old-fashioned fountain designed by the French company Inter Art has been added.

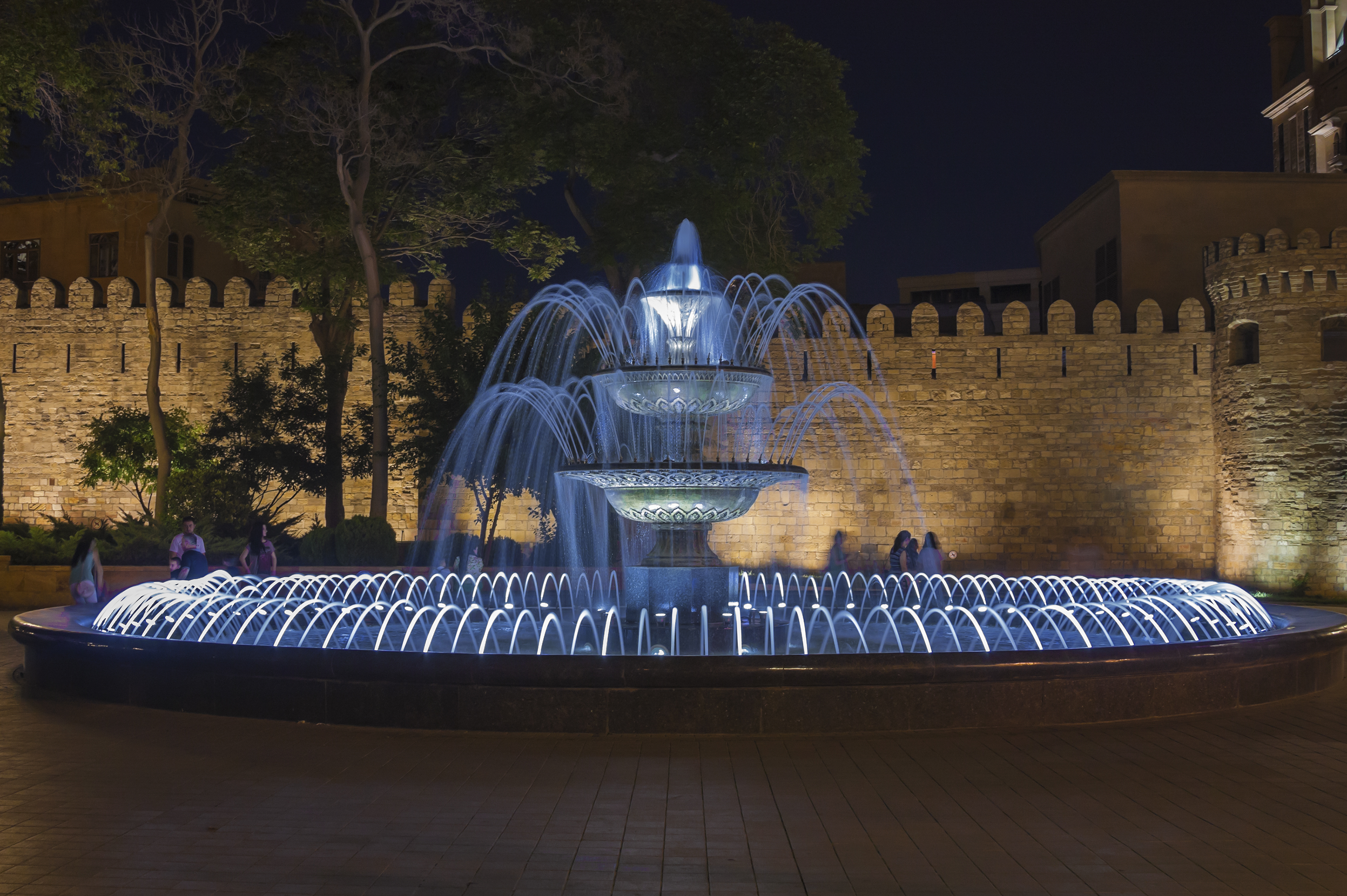
Fountain in the "Governor's garden" in Baku, Azerbaijan

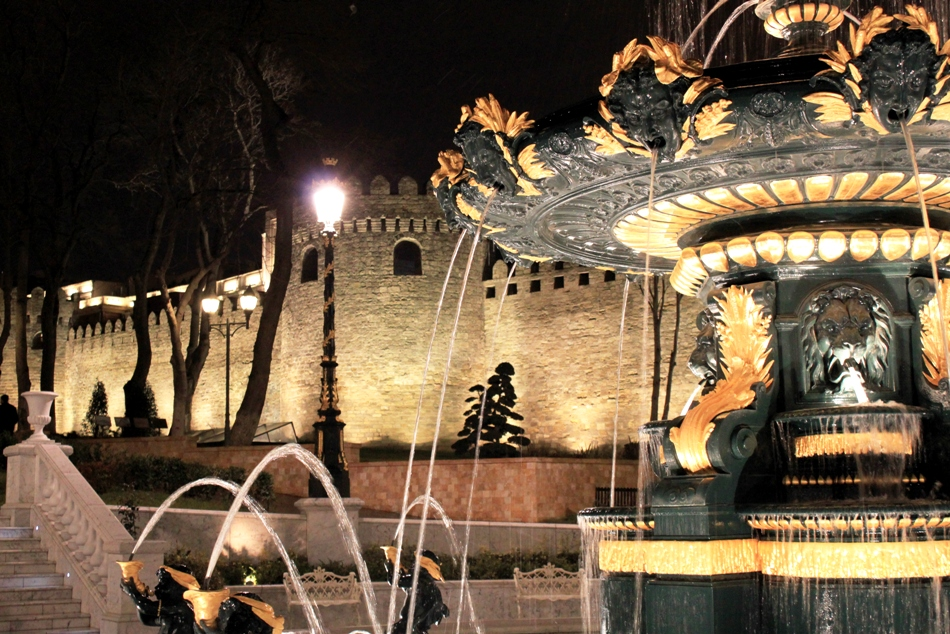
Fountain in night Baku, 2010

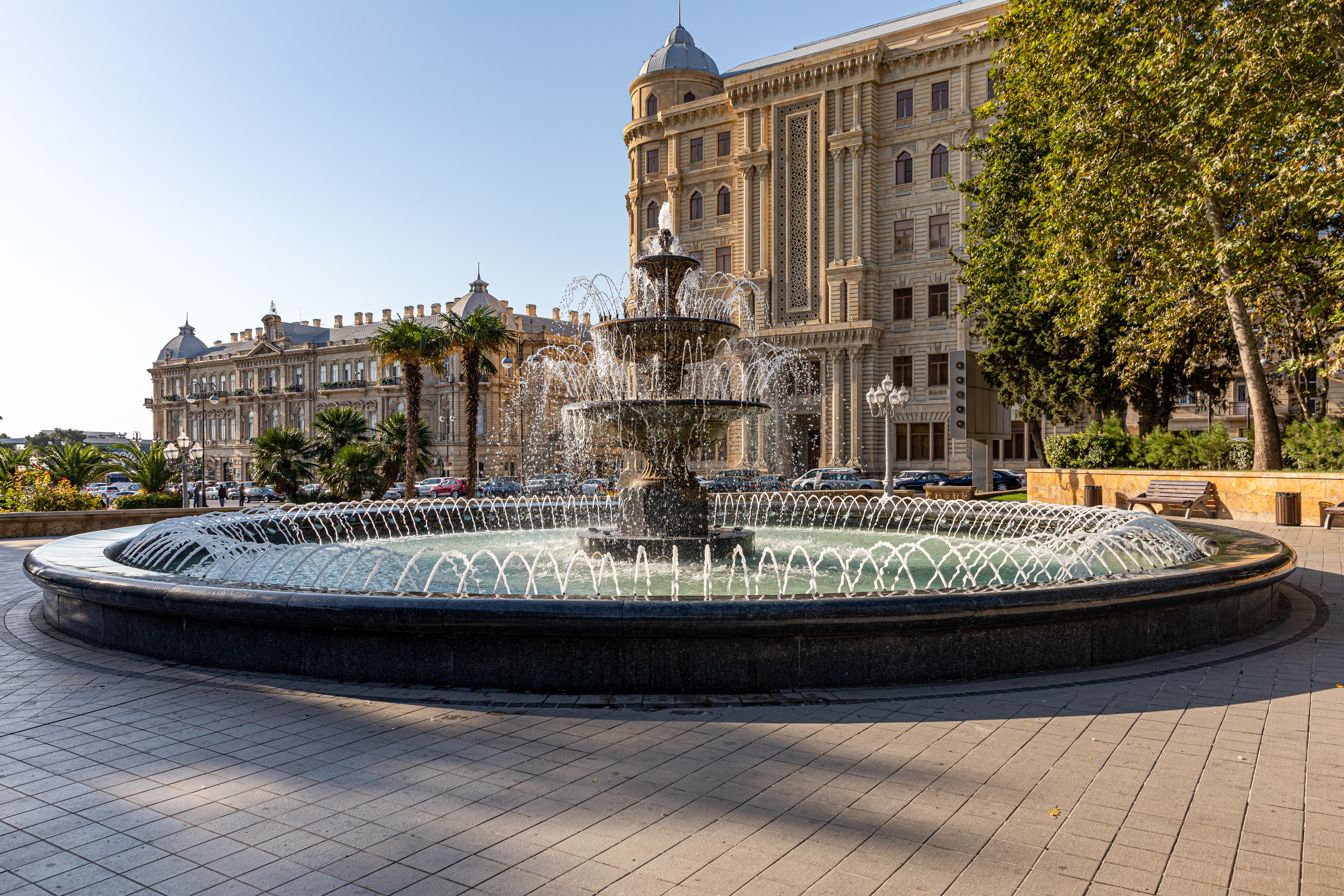
One of the many fountains in (Philharmonic Garden) Baku, Azerbaijan
