= Chin Mosque =

Former mosque in Baku, Azerbaijan

Chin mosque
- Azerbaijani: Çin məscidi; Arabic: مسجد تشين; Persian: مسجد جن
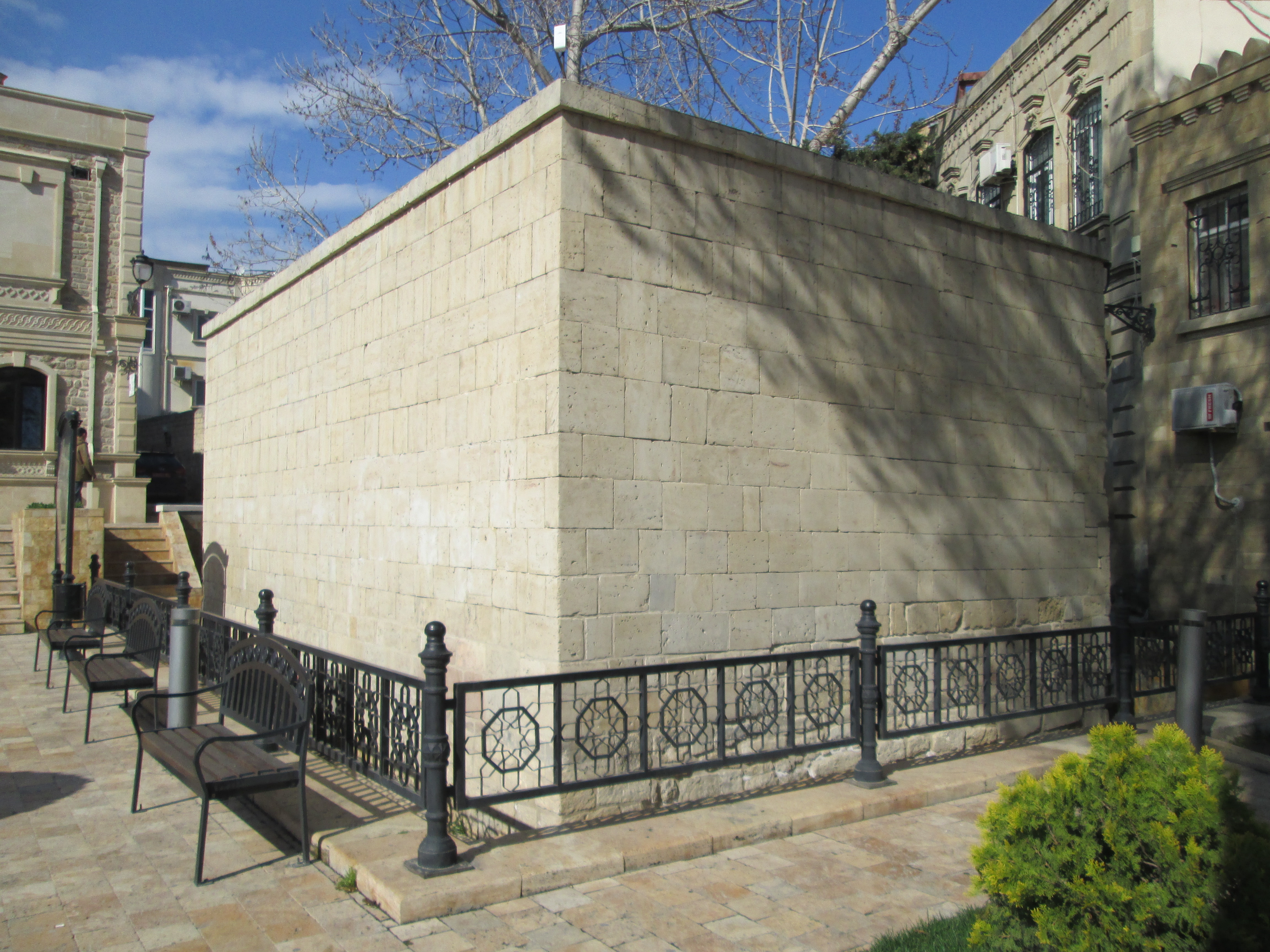
- The former mosque, now museum, in 2015

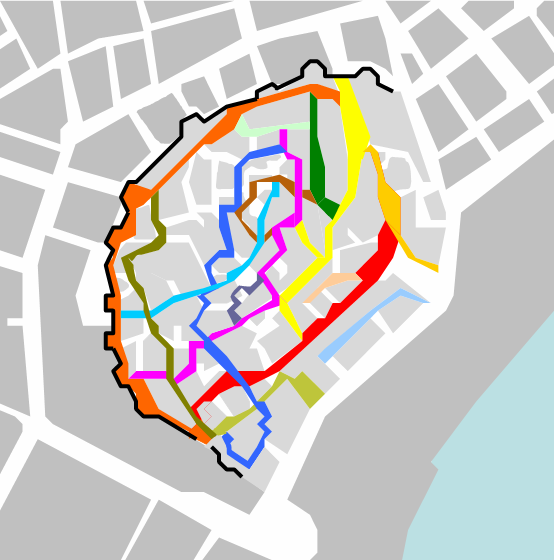
- Location of the former mosque in the Baku Old City

Religion
- Affiliation: Islam (former)
- Ecclesiastical or organisational status: Mosque (1376– ); Numismatic museum (since 2012)
- Status: Closed (as a mosque); Repurposed (as a museum)

Location
- Location: Old City, Baku
- Country: Azerbaijan
- Coordinates: 40°21′57″N 49°49′57″E

Architecture
- Type: Mosque architecture
- Style: Islamic; Shirvan-Absheron
- Founder: Fazlullah Imam ibn Osman Shirvani
- Completed: 1376

The Chin Mosque (Azerbaijani: Çin məscidi; ; Arabic: مسجد تشين), also known as the Gazi Fezlullah bin Osman Mosque, is a historical former mosque, located on Kichik Gala street, near the Palace of the Shirvanshahs, in the Old City of Baku, in Azerbaijan. Completed in the 14th century, the building is registered as a national architectural monument by the decision of the Cabinet of Ministers of the Republic of Azerbaijan dated August 2, 2001, No. 132.

No longer operating as a mosque, the building was repurposed in 2012 as a numismatic museum, part of the National Museum of History of Azerbaijan.

== History ==
According to the epigraphic inscription on the façade, on top of the entrance door, the mosque was built in 1375 (777 AH). It is also noted that, the mosque was constructed by the will of Fazlullah Imam ibn Osman Shirvani. For this reason, sometimes the mosque is called by his name.

Other epigraphic writing on the façade indicates that the monument was restored in 1772-1773 (1186 AH) by Masood Ali.

In 2012, substantial repair and restoration works were completed by the Old City State Historical Architectural Reserve Department.

== Architectural features ==
The stalactite mihrab, which consists of five tiers framed with a rectangle on the southern wall of the interior, forms certain motifs of Shirvan-Absheron architectural school. There are small niches at the edges of the walls.

The main façade of the mosque is asymmetrical and its rigid, voluminous composition is emphasized with classic-type portal-entrance.

Accurately profiled rectangular frame of the portal, profiled cavity and epigraphic heading of Arabic are represented in classic form, in the background of the entire wall of the facade. Among eastern style portals of Middle Ages of the city, the portal of this mosque is the most classic.

== Museum ==
Ancient coins and coins are exhibited and preserved in the former mosque. The main exposition of the museum is currency units and coins and other interesting ancient exhibits from the era of the Sasanids, Safavids, Shirvanshahs and others, which existed in various periods since the beginning of money circulation in Azerbaijan. The exhibits are divided into separate periods and grouped in various showcases. The general features of the period, specifications, types and information about the location of currency units of that period are placed on a separate board outside the showcases.

== Gallery ==
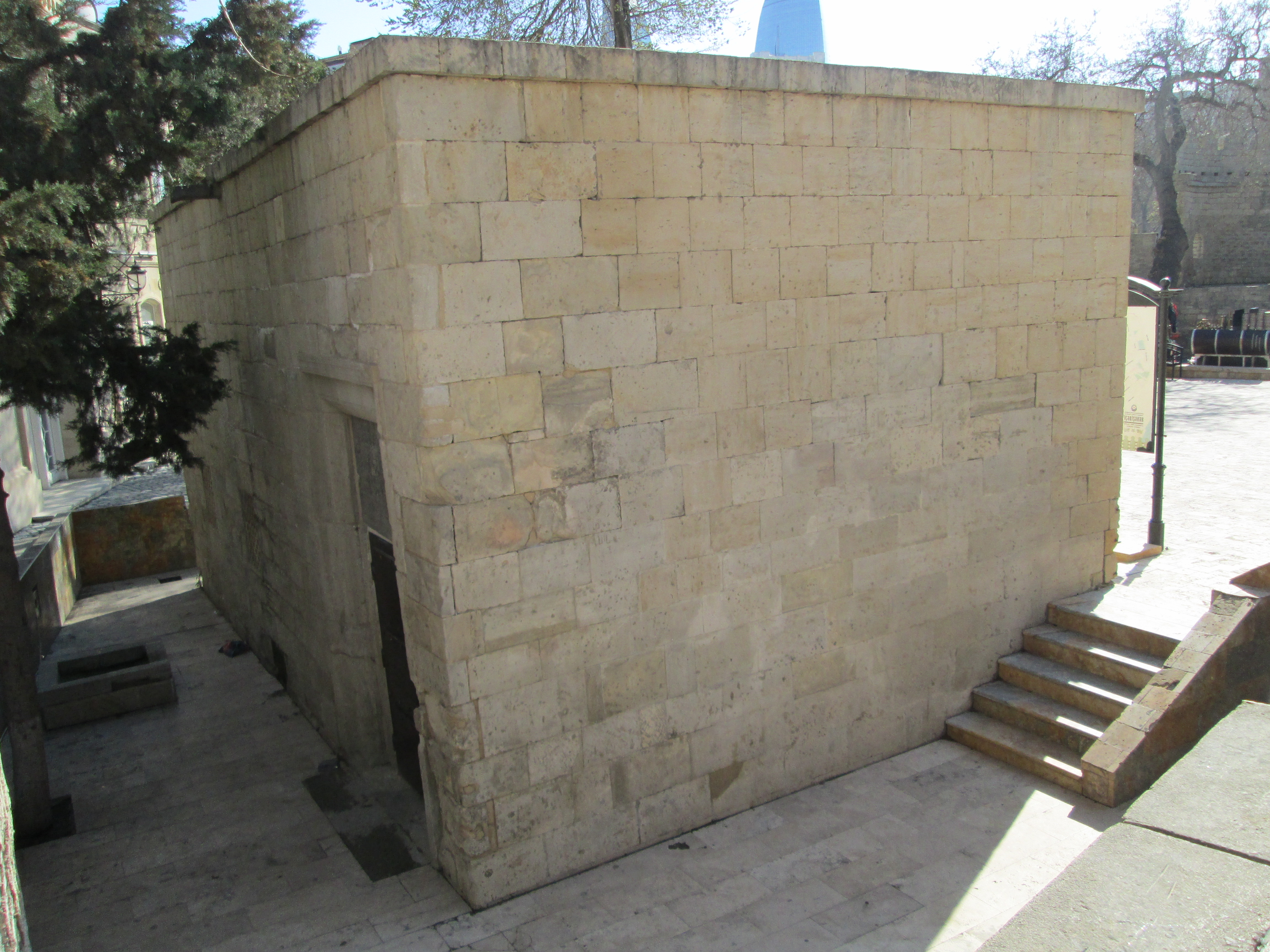

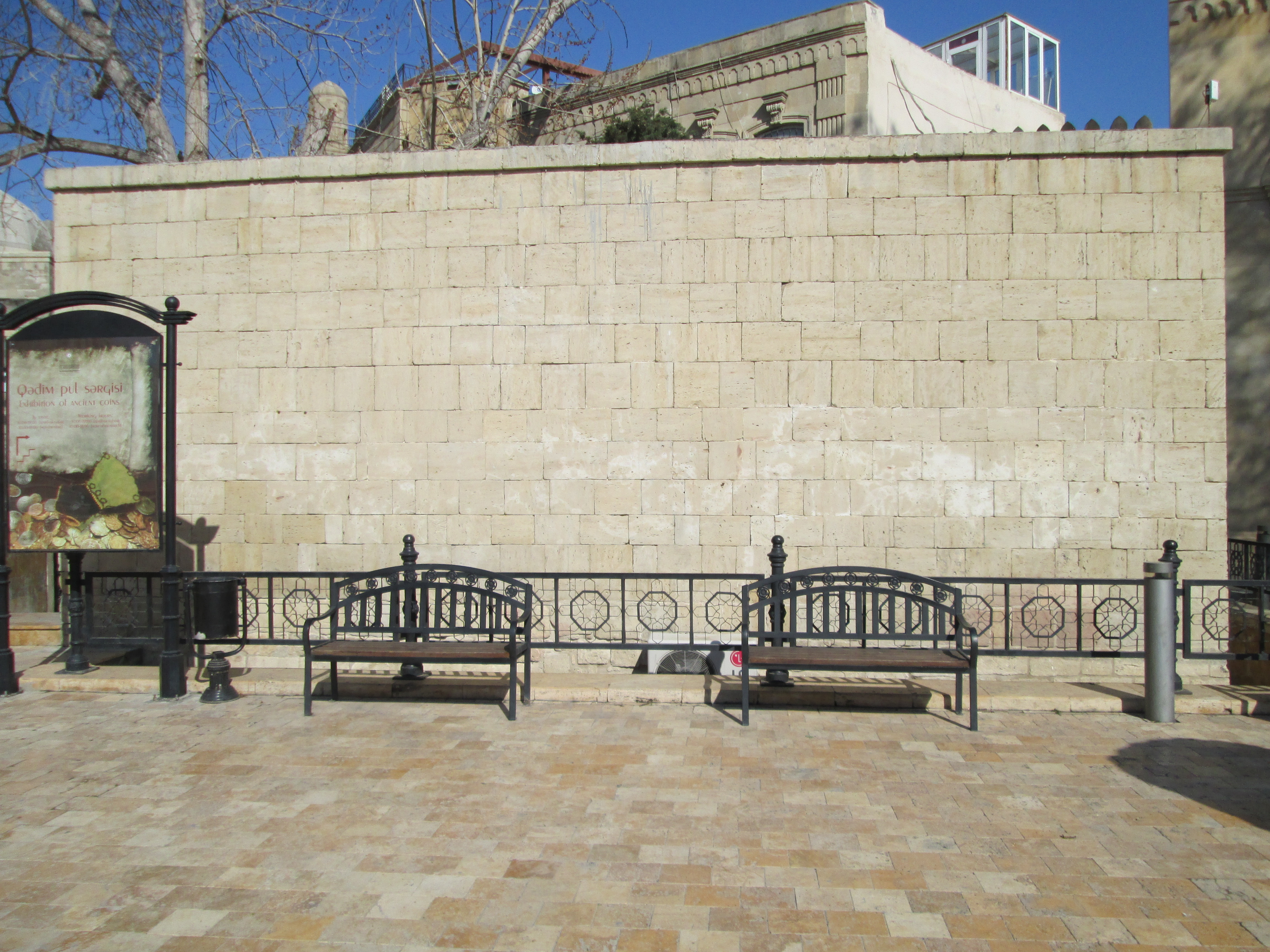

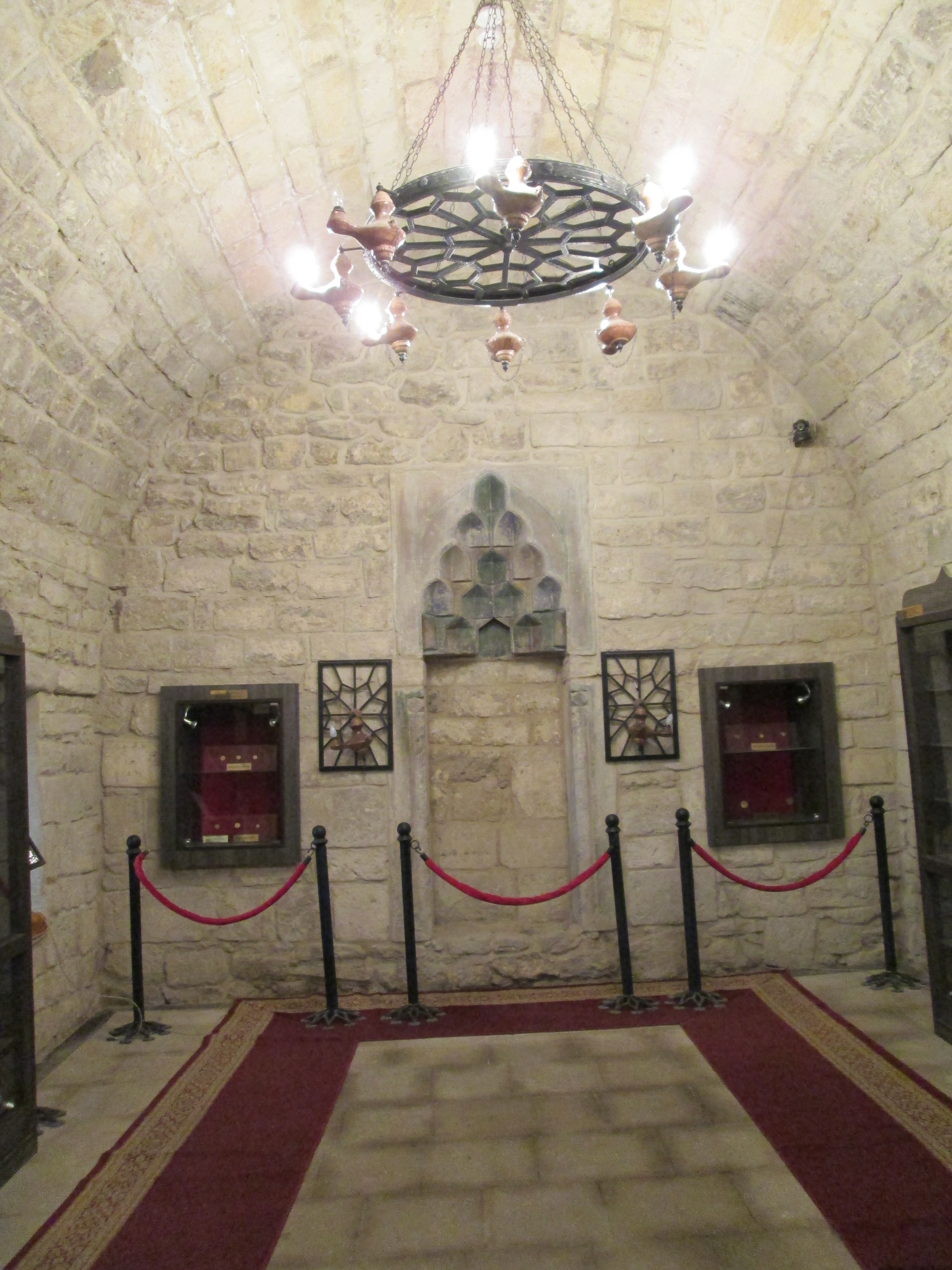

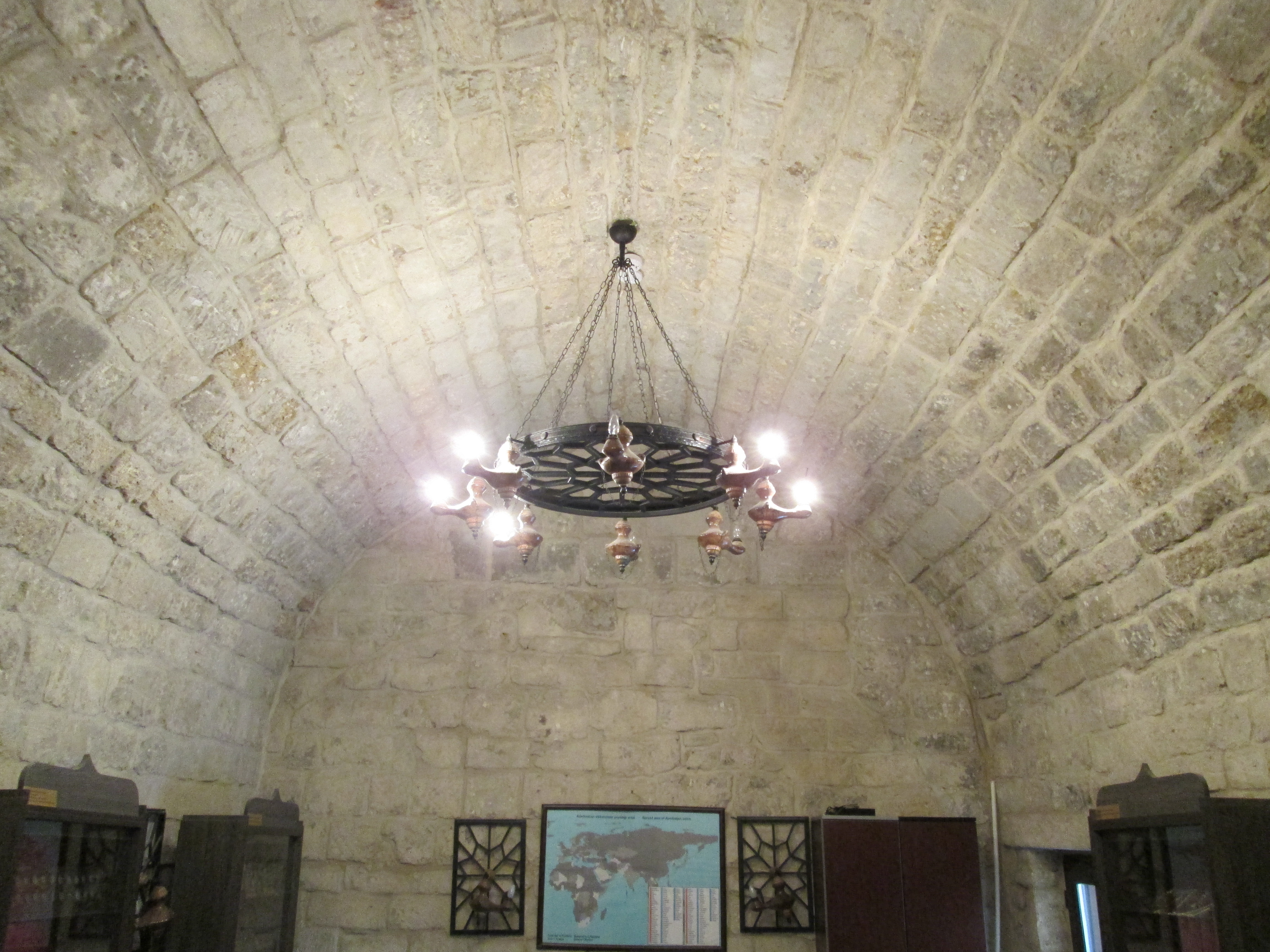

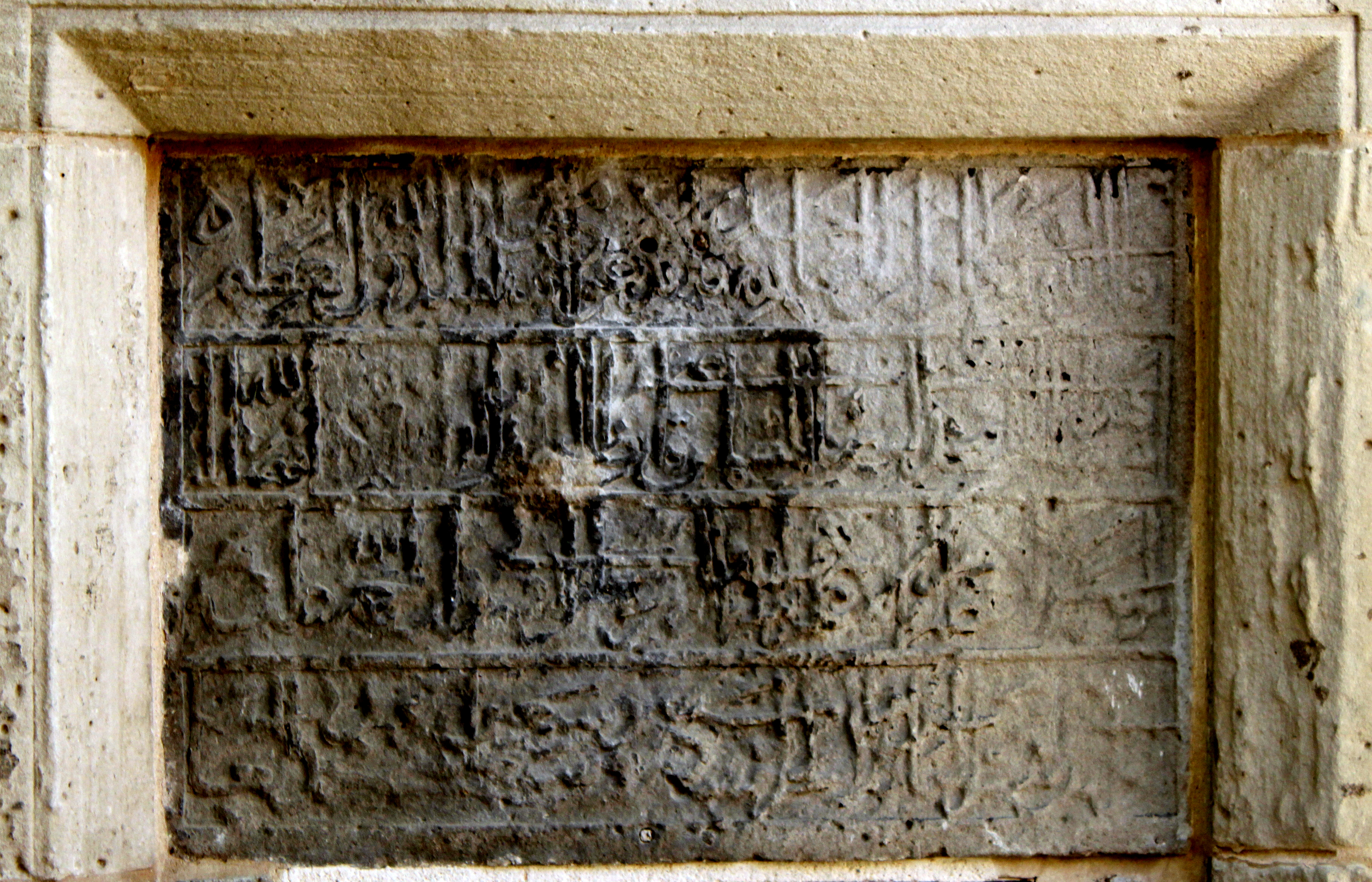

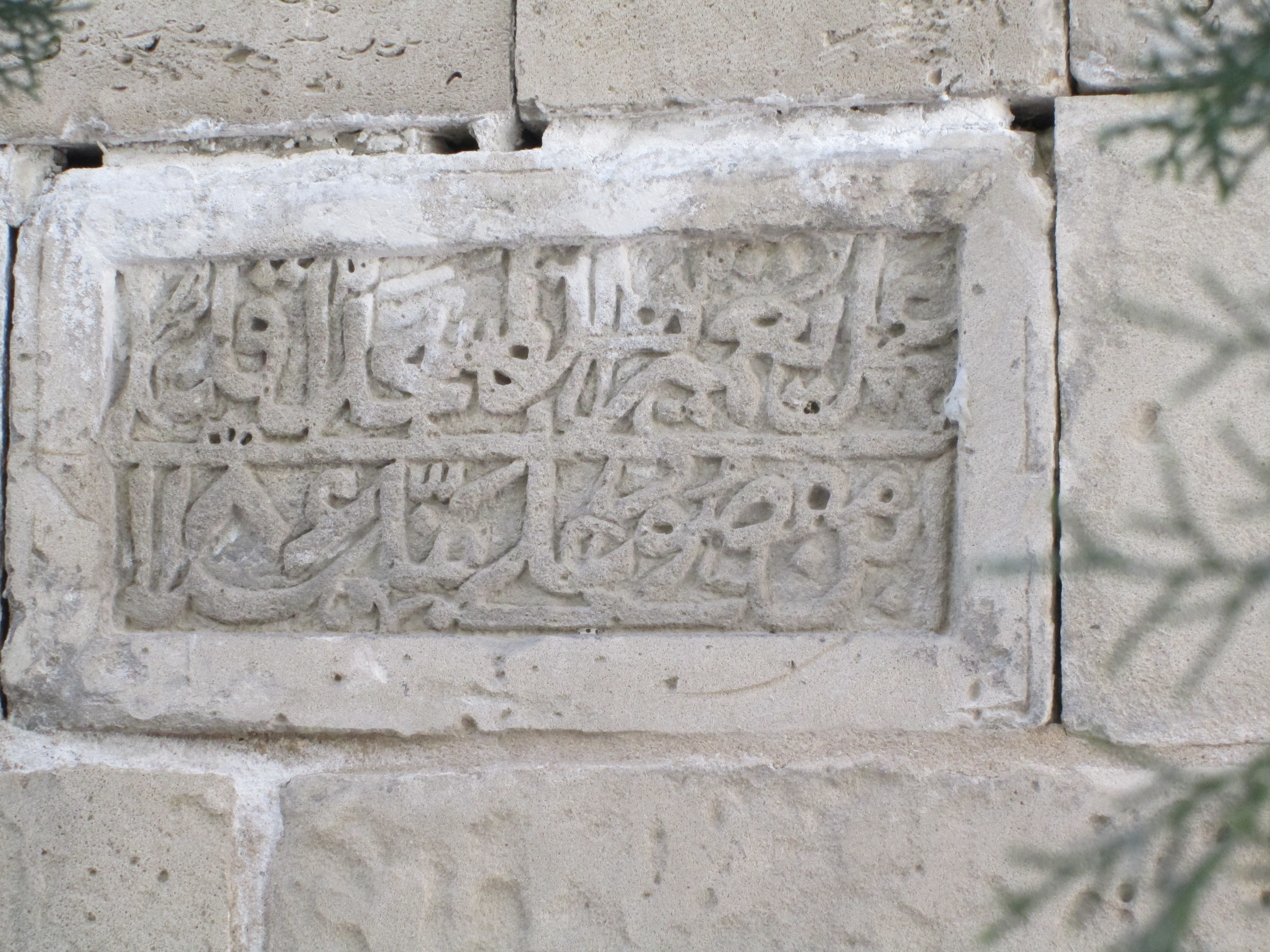

== See also ==
- Islam in Azerbaijan
- List of mosques in Azerbaijan
- List of mosques in Baku
