= List of mosques in Baku =

This is a list of notable mosques in Baku, Azerbaijan.

Mosques in Baku
Name	Year completed	Image	Notes
Jinn Mosque	14th century		
Takyeh (Old City, Baku)	13th century		
Molla Ahmad Mosque	1300		
Haci Bani Mosque	16th century		
Chin Mosque	1375		
Gileyli Mosque	1309		
Khidir Mosque	1301		
Sayyid Yahya Murtuza Mosque	17th century		
Sheikh Ibrahim Mosque	1416		
Juma Mosque (Baku)	1899		
Ashur Mosque	1169		
Tuba Shahi Mosque	1482		
Ajdarbey Mosque	1913		
Taza Pir Mosque	1914		
Haji Heybat Mosque	1791		
Bibi-Heybat Mosque	1997		
Heydar Mosque	2014		
