= Mirza Ahmed Mosque =

Former mosque in Baku, Azerbaijan

- Azerbaijani: Mirzə Əhməd Məscidi
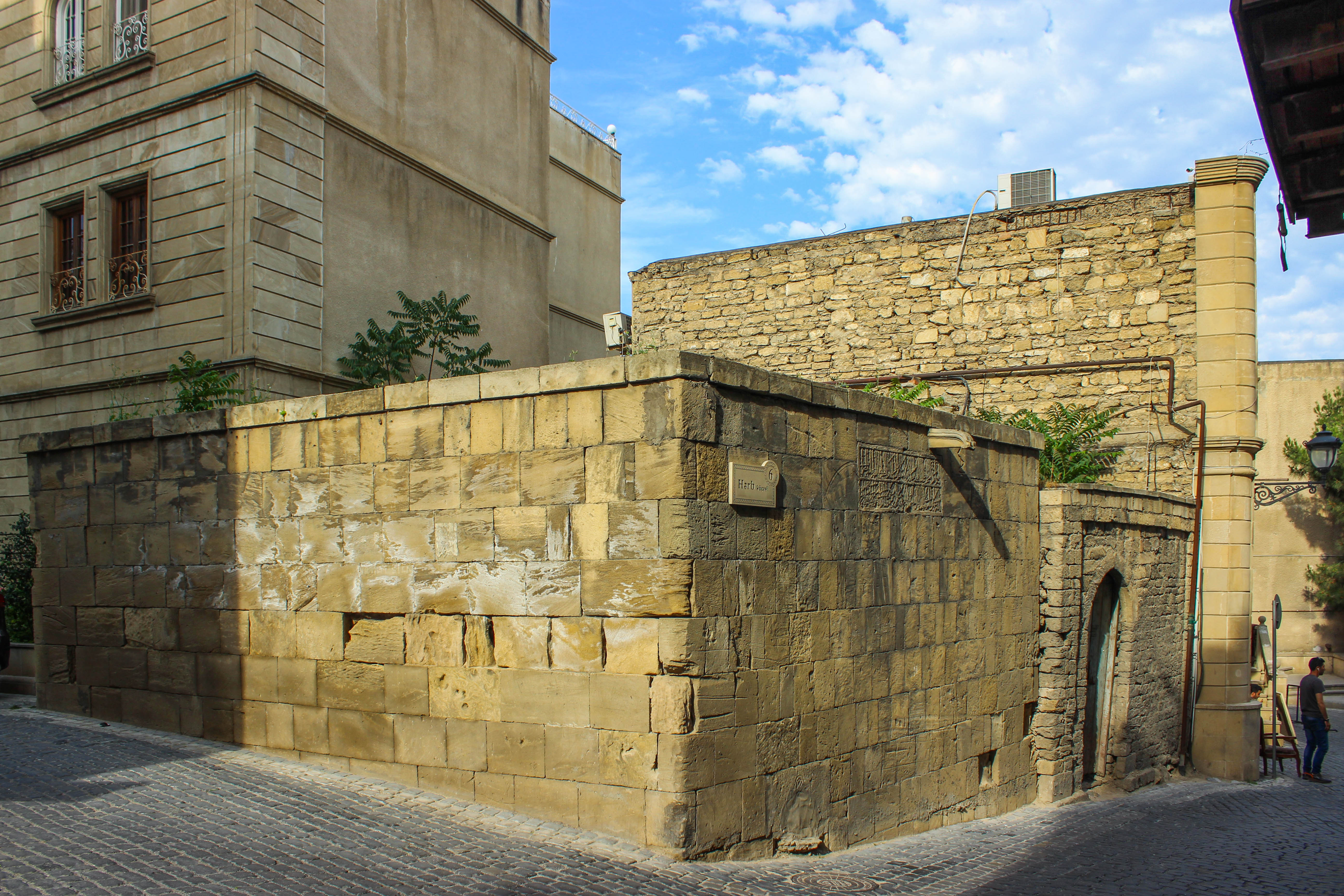
- The former mosque in 2019

- Location of the former mosque in Azerbaijan

Religion
- Affiliation: Islam (former)
- Ecclesiastical or organizational status: Mosque (former)
- Status: Abandoned

Location
- Location: Mirza Alakbar Sabir Street, Old City, Baku
- Country: Azerbaijan
- Interactive map of Mirza Ahmed Mosque
- Coordinates: 40°22′02″N 49°50′08″E

Architecture
- Architect: Haji Mirza Ahmed
- Type: Mosque architecture
- Style: Islamic; Shirvan-Absheron
- Completed: 1345

The Mirza Ahmed Mosque (Azerbaijani: Mirzə Əhməd Məscidi) is a former mosque, located in the Icherisheher of Baku, the capital of Azerbaijan. Completed in 1345, and built by Haji Mirza Ahmed, the former mosque is situated on the Mirza Alakbar Sabir Street, in a row with residential buildings.

== Architecture ==
On plan, the former mosque has a quadrangular shape. It consists of a square vestibule, a service room and a prayer hall with niches. The architectural structure of the mosque has domes made of local stone and pointed arches.

In the centre of the entrance door, there is an inscription from the Koran, as well as the name of the architect. The roof of the mosque, as well as the adjacent auxiliary premises, were destroyed. There is an assumption that the mosque was built on the site of an older temple.

== See also ==
- Islam in Azerbaijan
- List of mosques in Azerbaijan
- List of mosques in Baku
