= Haji Bani Mosque =

Former mosque in Baku, Azerbaijan

- Azerbaijani: Hacı Bani məscidi Persian: مسجد حاجی بنی
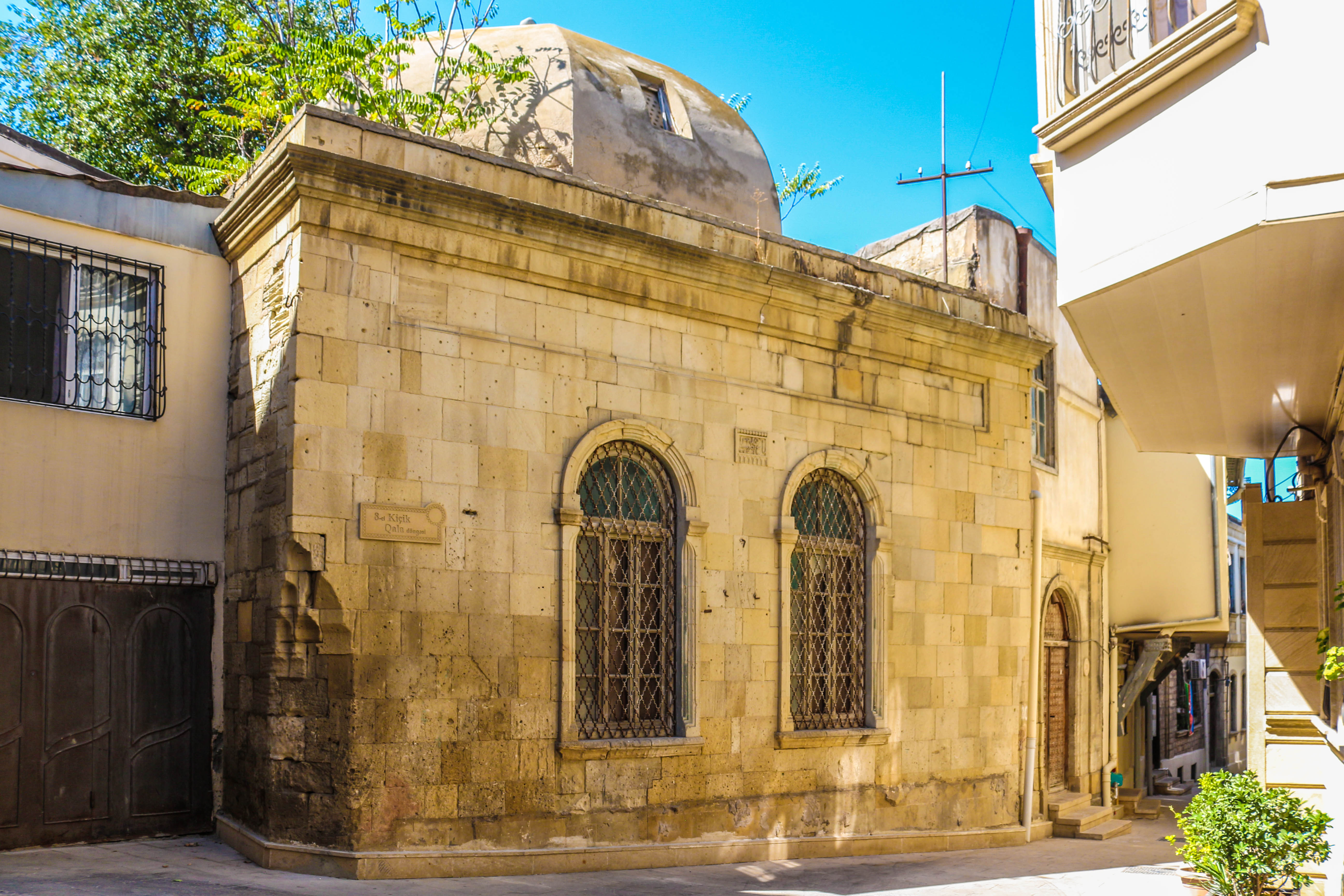
- The former mosque in 2016

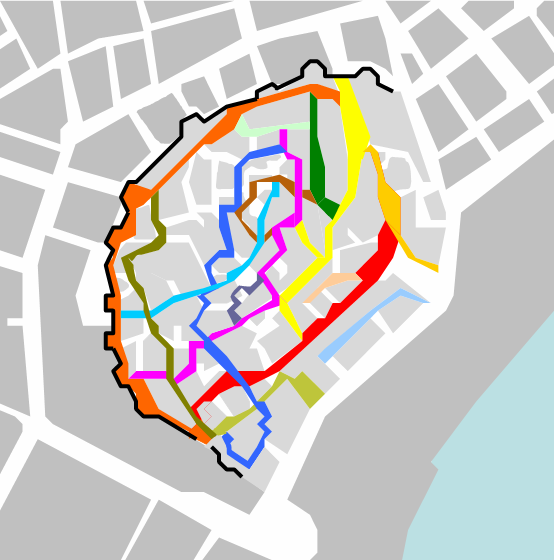
- Location of the former mosque in the Baku Old City

Religion
- Affiliation: Islam (former)
- Ecclesiastical or organisational status: Mosque (16th century–1928)

Location
- Location: Old City, Baku
- Country: Azerbaijan
- Coordinates: 40°22′01″N 49°50′01″E

Architecture
- Completed: 16th century

Specifications
- Dome: One
- Inscriptions: One
- Materials: Stone

The Haji Bani Mosque (Azerbaijani: Hacı Bani məscidi, Persian: مسجد حاجی بنی) is a former mosque, located in the Old City of Baku, in Azerbaijan.

The 16th-century former mosque was designated as a nationally significant immovable historical and cultural monument by the decision No. 132 of the Cabinet of Azerbaijan on August 2, 2001.

== Overview ==
The Haji Bani Mosque is situated near the Palace of the Shirvanshahs complex in the Old City of Baku. The former mosque does not have a minaret. According to a short epigraphic inscription on the facade, the mosque was constructed in the sixteenth century by the architect Haji Bani, and underwent major restoration in 1320 AH (1902/1903 CE).

After the Soviet occupation in Azerbaijan, official measures to combat religion began in 1928. In December of the same year, the Azerbaijan Communist Party Central Committee transferred many mosques, churches, and synagogues to the balance of educational clubs for use in enlightening directions. If there were 3,000 mosques in Azerbaijan in 1917, by 1927, this number had reduced to 1,700, and by 1933, it was down to 17.

After the restoration of Azerbaijan's independence, the mosque was included in the list of nationally significant immovable historical and cultural monuments by the decision No. 132 of the Cabinet of Azerbaijan on August 2, 2001.

== Architecture ==
In the mosque, directly opposite the entrance, there is a large-sized mihrab adorned with a stalactite design. During this restoration, renovation works were carried out, and a vestibule and a special section for women (shebistan) were added. The prayer hall is illuminated twofold thanks to the paired semicircular windows. The restoration works maintained and preserved traditional architectural styles and motifs in both the interior and exterior. The mosque's expressive silhouette, the foundation on a cubical base, the distinctive Absheron-type stone pointed dome, and the beautifully emphasized corner of the building in the direction of the street reflect the characteristic features of local architecture.

== See also ==
- Islam in Azerbaijan
- List of mosques in Azerbaijan
- List of mosques in Baku
