= Gileyli Mosque =

Mosque in Baku, Azerbaijan

- Azerbaijani: Gileyli Məscidi; Persian: مسجد گیلیلی
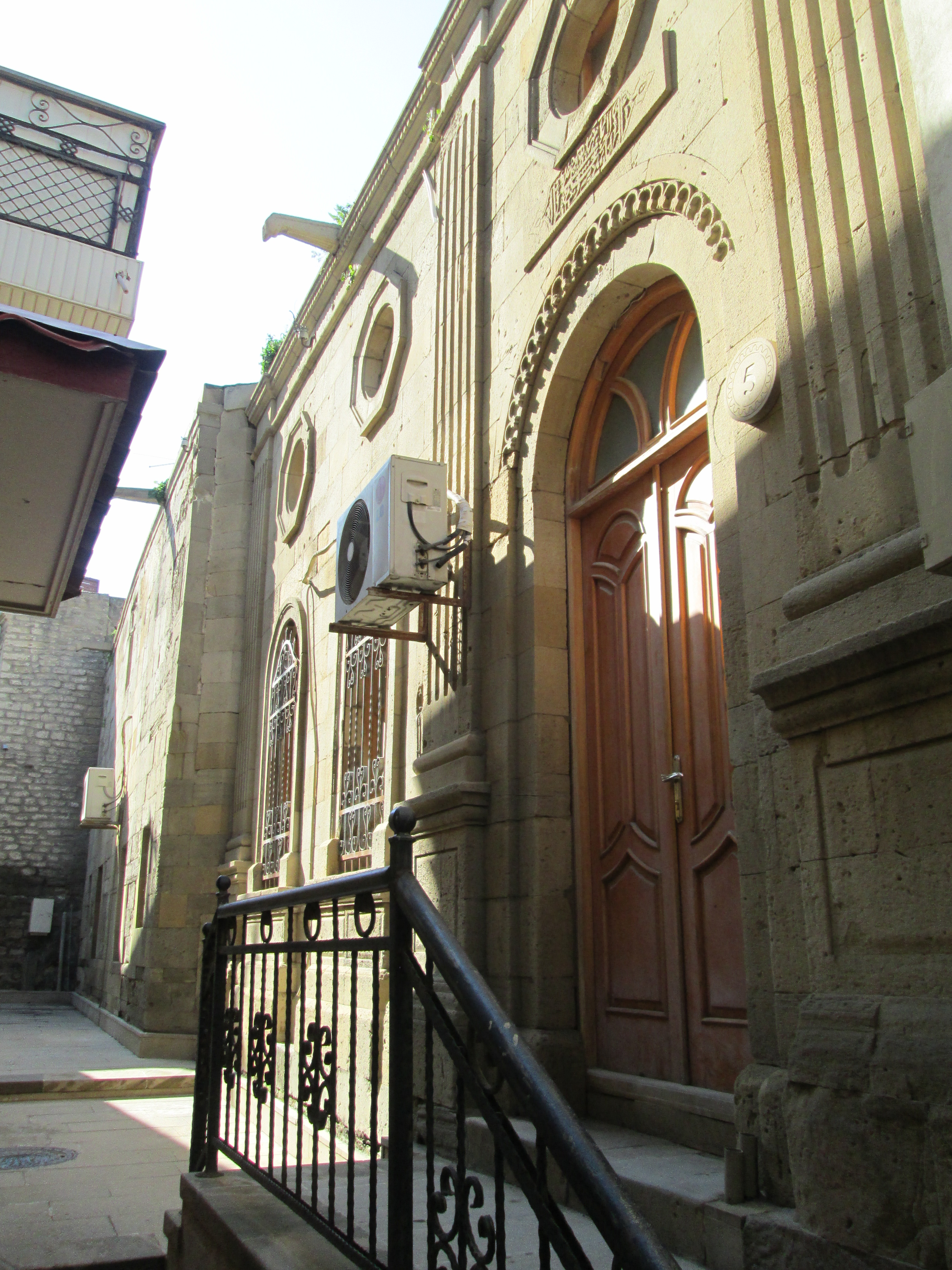
- The mosque entrance in 2015

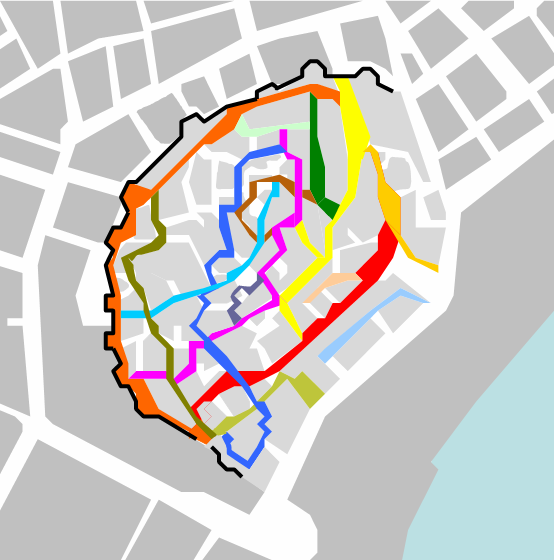
- Location of the mosque in the Baku Old City

Religion
- Affiliation: Islam
- Ecclesiastical or organizational status: Mosque
- Status: Active

Location
- Location: Old City, Baku
- Country: Azerbaijan
- Interactive map of Gileyli Mosque
- Coordinates: 40°21′59″N 49°50′09″E

Architecture
- Type: Mosque architecture
- Style: Islamic; Shirvan-Absheron
- Completed: 1309

Specifications
- Dome: Two
- Dome dia. (outer): 14 by 10 m (46 by 33 ft)
- Materials: Stone

The Gileyli Mosque (Azerbaijani: Gileyli Məscidi, Persian: مسجد گیلیلی) or Jomard Garay Mosque (Azerbaijani: Comərd Gəray Məscidi, Persian: مسجد جومارد گرای) is a mosque, located on Mirza Mansur street in the Old City of Baku in Azerbaijan. Completed in 1309 by the Iranian Shirvanshahs, the building was registered as a national architectural monument by the Cabinet of Ministers of the Republic of Azerbaijan on August 2, 2001, No. 132.

== History ==
The Gileyli Mosque was constructed in two stages: in 1309, during the Shirvanshahs period, and in the second half of the 19th century.

The name of the mosque corresponds to the name of the quarter where lived merchants of silk, originally from Gilan.

== Architecture ==
Originally, the mosque once had doors made of walnut tree, but it was burned and replaced.

The old part has a cruciform-dome composition. The arms of the cruciform are deep domes; at the corners small rooms are placed. The mihrab with accurate proportion, profiled and decorated with architectural elements and details enriches the interior of the worshipping hall, which differs with its rigidness and tectonics of voluminous masses. The new section built in the 19th century does not affect the integrity of the scheme, but expanding the convenience. Its pointed-form dome repeats formed architectural atmosphere of the place, and becomes an integral part of the composition structure. Here are implemented new elements of European architectural composition. It's vividly seen on the structure of the façade.

In 1805 a rectangular room 11 m (36 ft) long was attached to the mosque. Great attention is paid to the portal where an ornament in the form of a stalactite belt is applied. The windows are decorated with carved lattices.

== Gallery ==
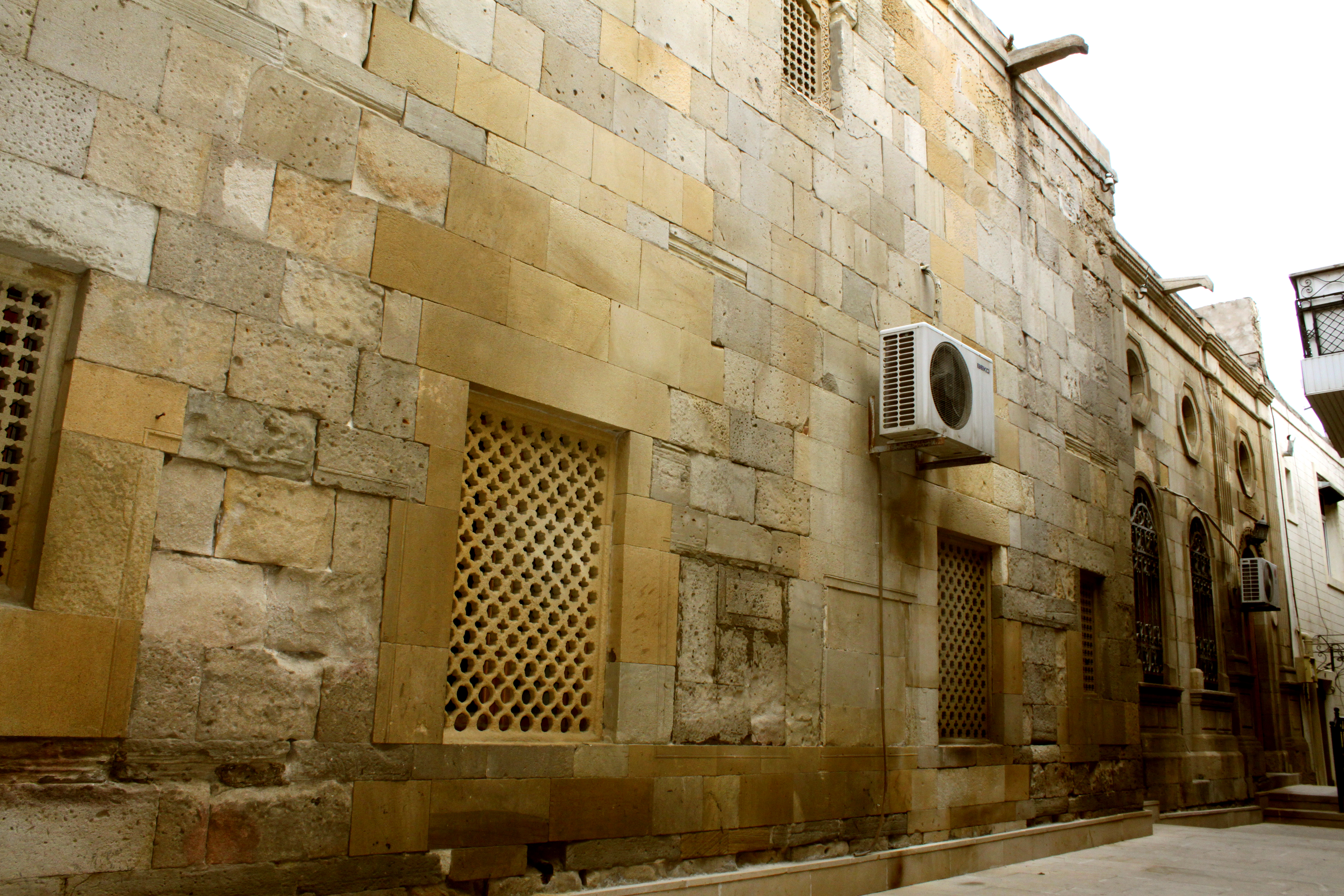

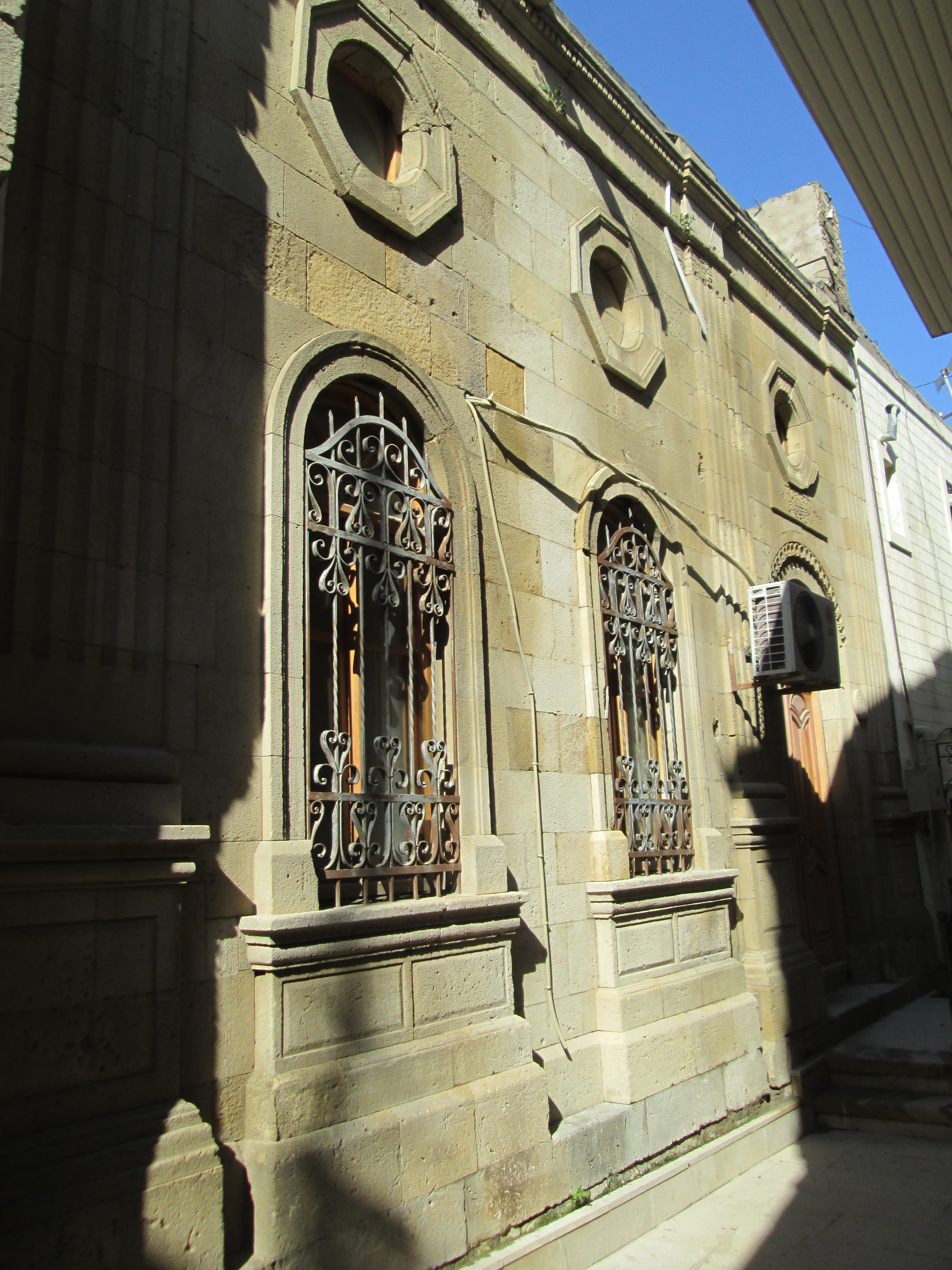

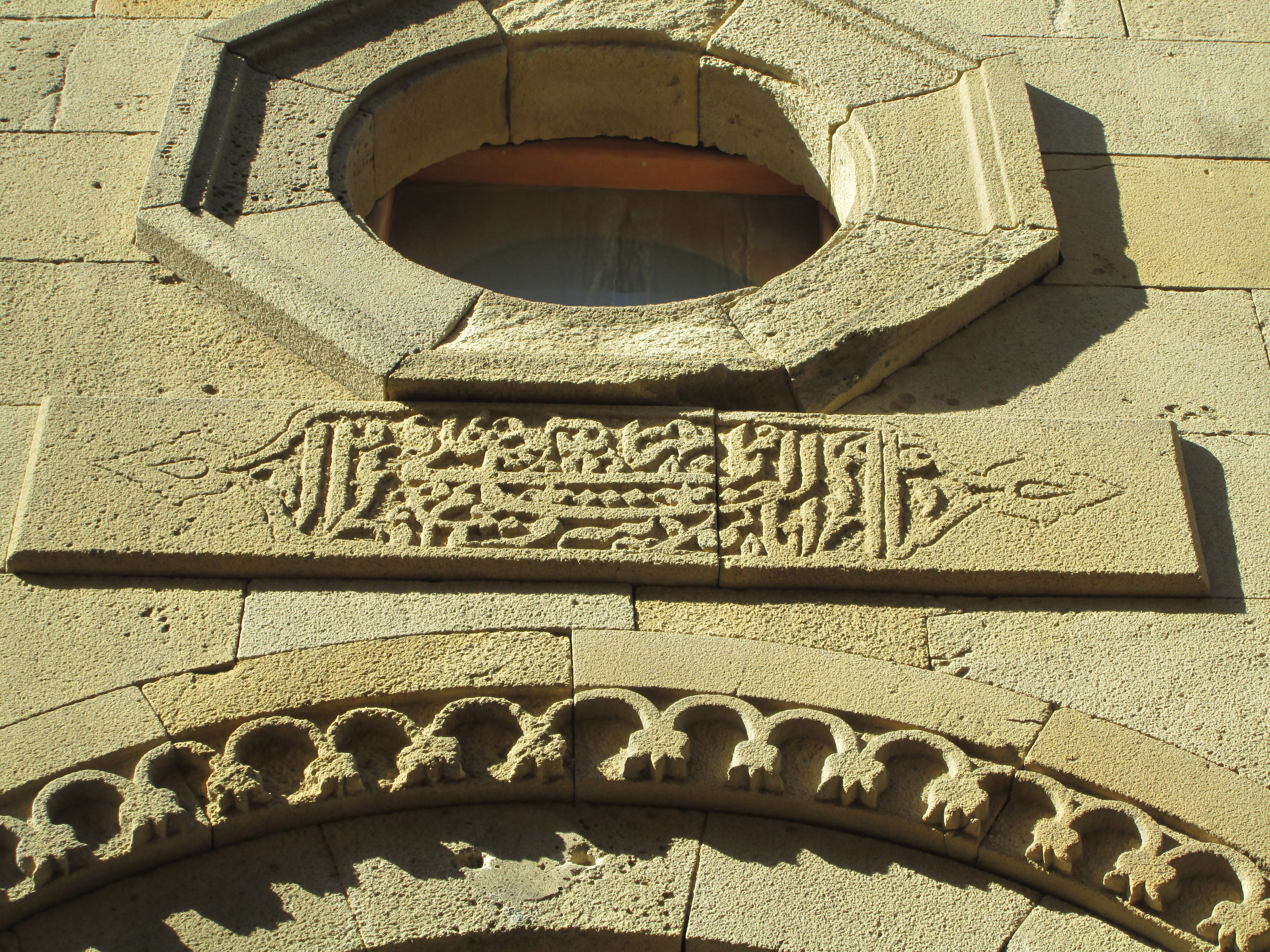

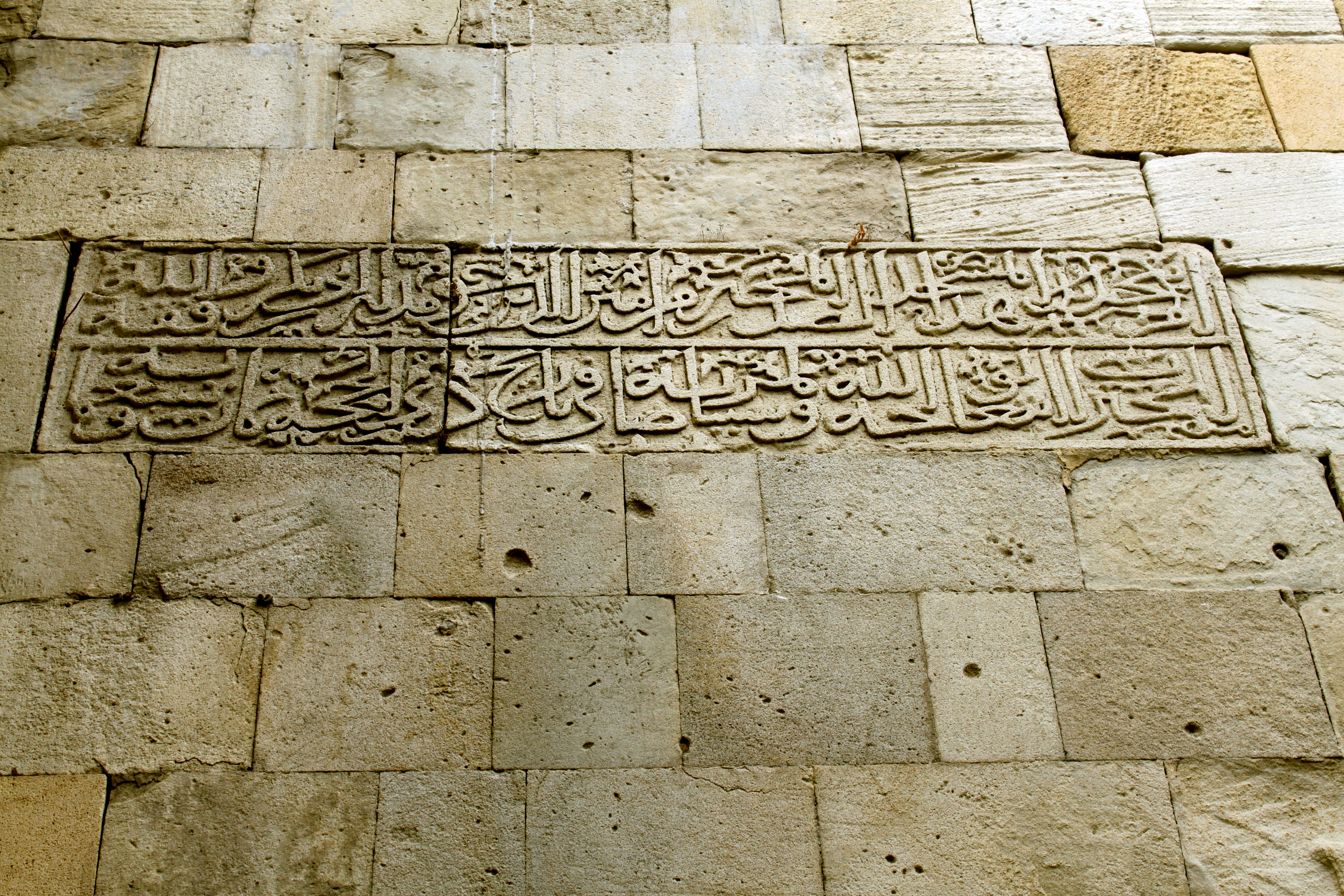

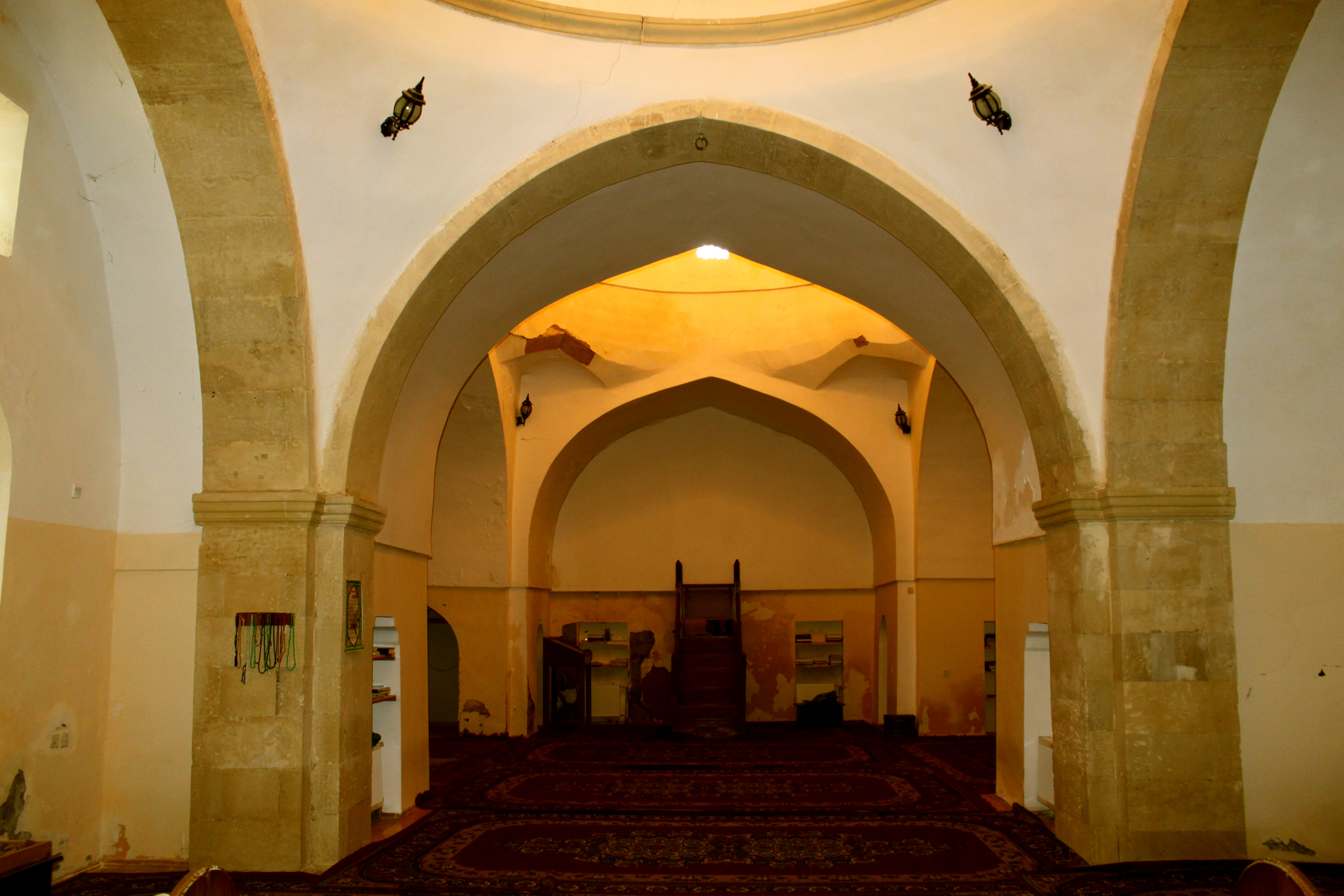

== See also ==
- Islam in Azerbaijan
- List of mosques in Azerbaijan
- List of mosques in Baku
