= Ajdarbey Mosque =

Mosque in Baku, Azerbaijan

- Arabic: Əjdərbəy Məscidi; Arabic: مسجد أجدر باي
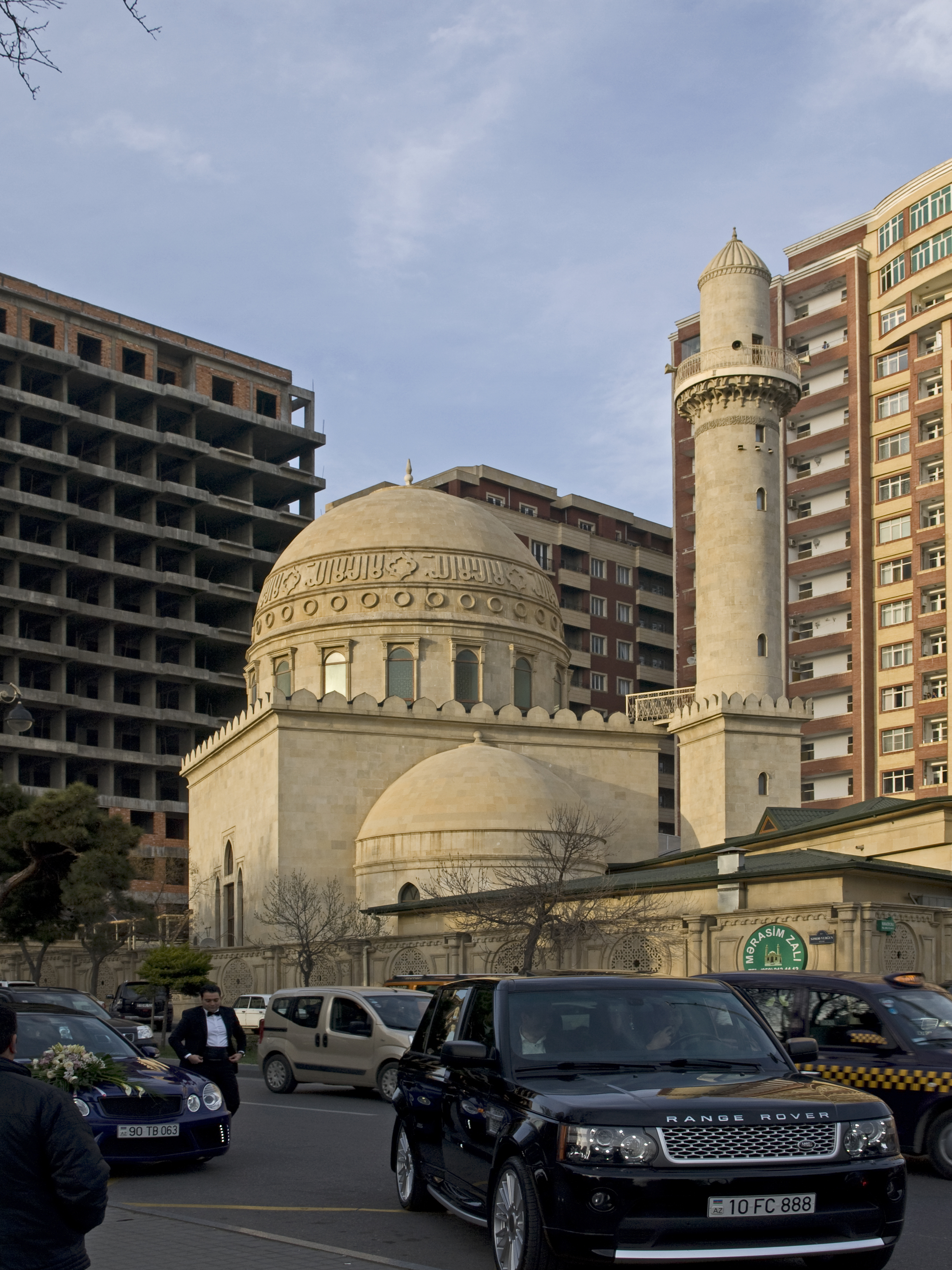
- The mosque in 2016

- Location of the mosque in Baku

Religion
- Affiliation: Islam (both Sunni and Shia)
- Ecclesiastical or organizational status: Mosque: (1913–1917); (since 1945)
- Status: Active

Location
- Location: Samed Vurgun Street, Baku
- Country: Azerbaijan
- Interactive map of Ajdarbey Mosque
- Coordinates: 40°23′9″N 49°50′16″E

Architecture
- Architect: Zivar bey Ahmadbeyov
- Type: Mosque architecture
- Funded by: Haji Ajdar bey Ashurbeyov
- Groundbreaking: 2 March 1912
- Completed: 1913

Specifications
- Capacity: 3,000 worshipers
- Interior area: 4,000 m^{2} (43,000 sq ft)
- Dome: 1
- Minaret: 1

The Ajdarbey Mosque (Azerbaijani: Əjdərbəy Məscidi; Arabic: مسجد أجدر باي), also known as the Blue Mosque and the Ittifag Mosque, is a mosque, located in Baku, Azerbaijan. It was built from 2 March 1912 to 3 December 1913 and is located on Samed Vurgun Street, formerly Krasnovodskaya Street, north of the city center.

== Overview ==
The project of the mosque was made by the architect Zivar bay Ahmadbayov, and the construction was sponsored by Haji Ajdar bey Ashurbeyov. The Kanni-Tepe city quarter, where the mosque was built, was at the time filled by one-floor private houses. The building of the mosque has an angle of approximately 45 degrees to Krasnovodskaya Street so that the building could be better appreciated. For the same purpose, it was built on the slope of the hill.

The architecture is simple; there is a big domed prayer room, with a blue interior to the dome ceiling, and a minaret next to it. An iwan is from the east of the prayer room, and a mihrab is from the south and the west. The dome is put on a tall tholobate, to enhance the volume. There is extensive and fine stone carving covering the walls. It was made by Salman Atayev, who also worked on other buildings in Baku constructed in the 1910s.

During Soviet occupation of Azerbaijan, worship at the mosque ceased; and was resumed following World War II. A grant of 3 million manats was awarded in 2010 by President Ilham Aliyev to restore the partially damaged mosque and Aliyev opened the restored mosque in 2011.

== See also ==
- Islam in Azerbaijan
- List of mosques in Azerbaijan
- List of mosques in Baku
