= Sayyid Yahya Murtuza Mosque =

Former mosque in Baku, Azerbaijan

Sayyid Yahya Murtuza mosque
- Azerbaijani: Seyid Yahya Murtuza məscidi Persian: مسجد سید یحیی مرتضی
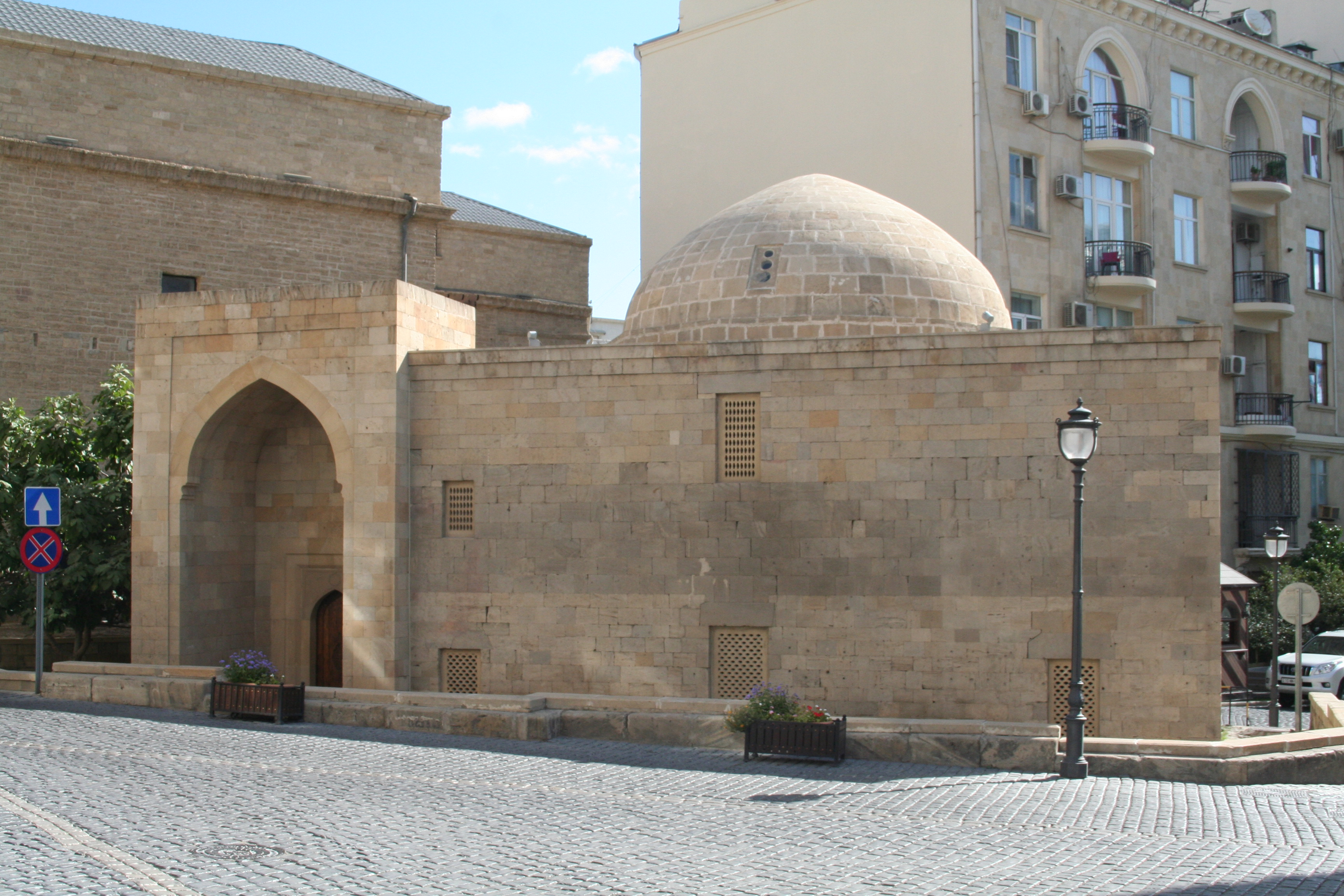
- The former mosque in 2015

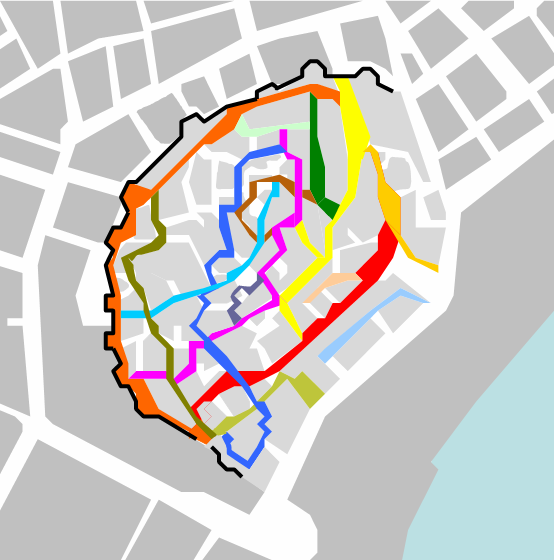
- Location of the former mosque in the Baku Old City

Religion
- Affiliation: Islam (former)
- Ecclesiastical or organizational status: Mosque (17th century–1928); Profane use (1928–1991)
- Status: Abandoned (as a mosque); Restored

Location
- Location: Old City, Baku
- Country: Azerbaijan
- Interactive map of Sayyid Yahya Murtuza mosque
- Coordinates: 40°21′53″N 49°50′07″E

Architecture
- Type: Mosque architecture
- Style: Islamic; Shirvan-Absheron
- Founder: Sayyid Yahya Murtuza
- Completed: 17th century
- Dome: One

The Sayyid Yahya Murtuza mosque (Azerbaijani: Seyid Yahya Murtuza məscidi, Persian: مسجد سید یحیی مرتضی) is a historical former mosque, located on Asaf Zeynalli street, in the Old City of Baku, in Azerbaijan. Completed in the 17th century, the building was registered as a national architectural monument by the decision of the Cabinet of Ministers of the Republic of Azerbaijan dated August 2, 2001, No. 132.

== History ==
Located on the medieval caravan trade route, the former mosque was built in the early 17th century. It was built on own expenses of Sayyid Yahya Murtuza, who was one of the most influential personalities of his era. He acted as a religious clergyman figure in the mosque. He was buried in the courtyard of the mosque after his death. At present, his grave is located next to the entrance door of the former mosque.

The former mosque operated as a carpenter workshop during the Azerbaijan SSR period.

After the 1990s, the mosque became a part of Icheri Sheher Juma Mosque. Currently, the Hazrat Mohammed mosque religious community operates in the mosque.

The former mosque is square shaped in the plan and has a central dome and no minaret. On the south wall there is a stalactic tiered mihrab.

== Gallery ==
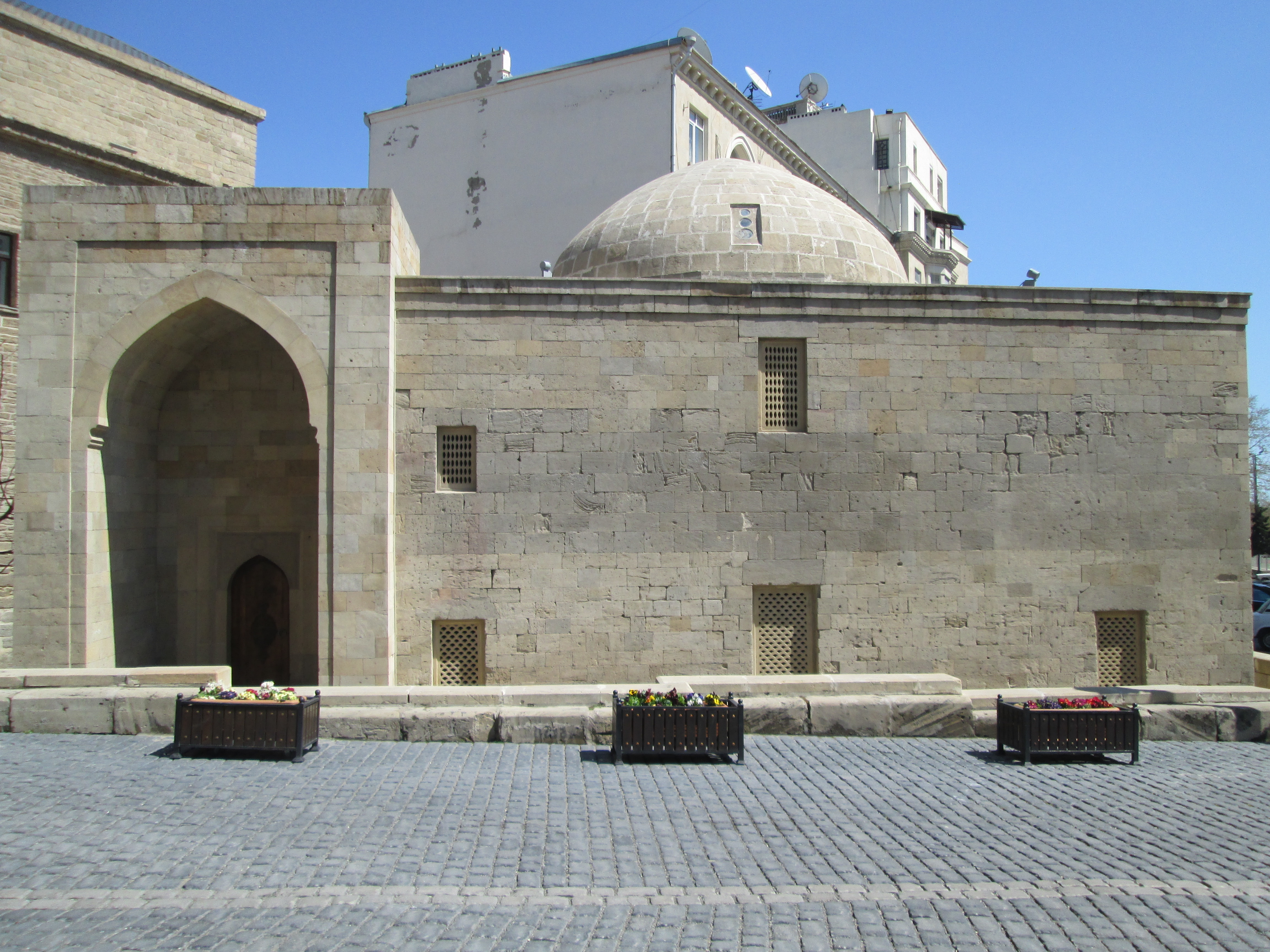

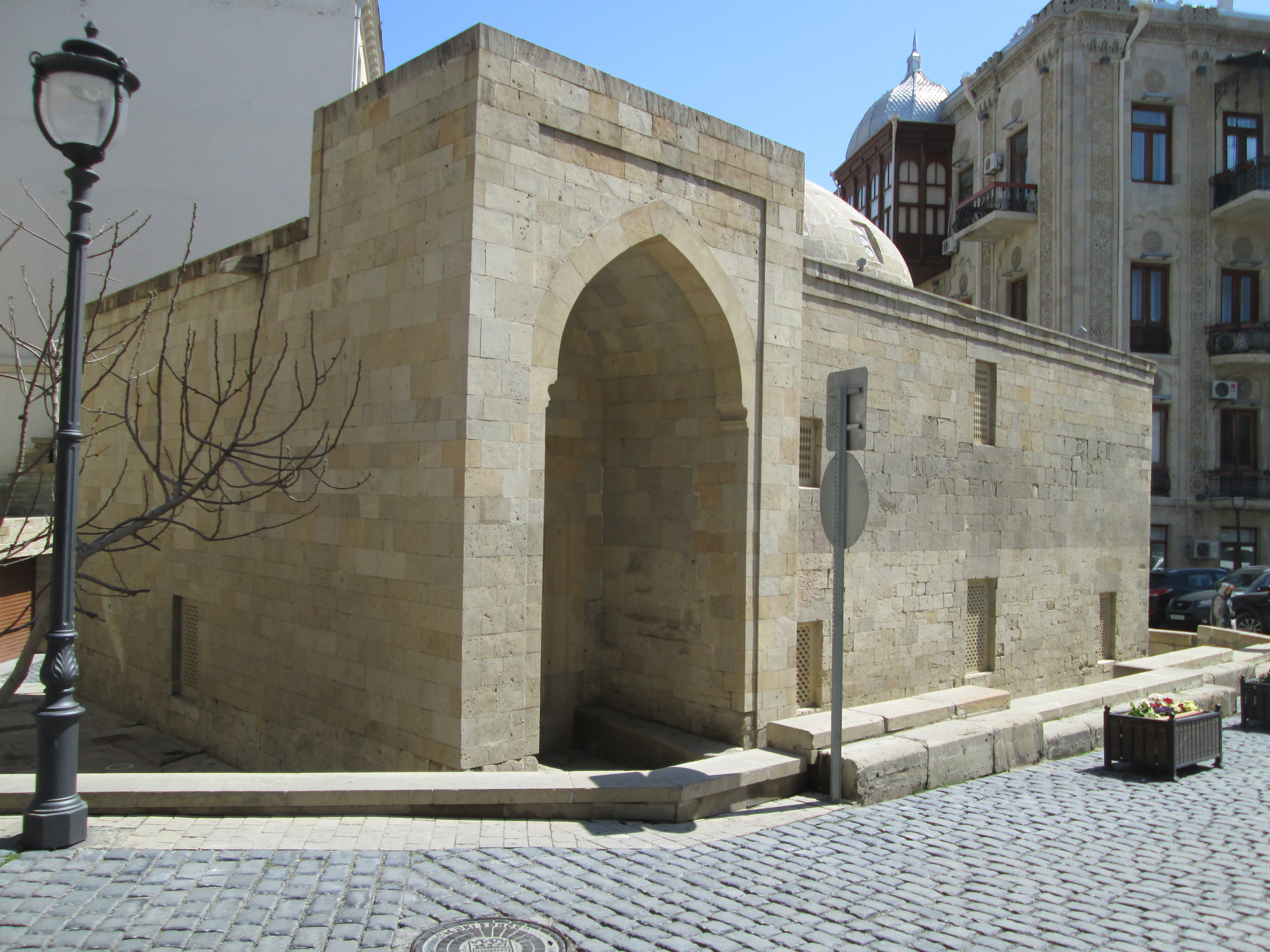

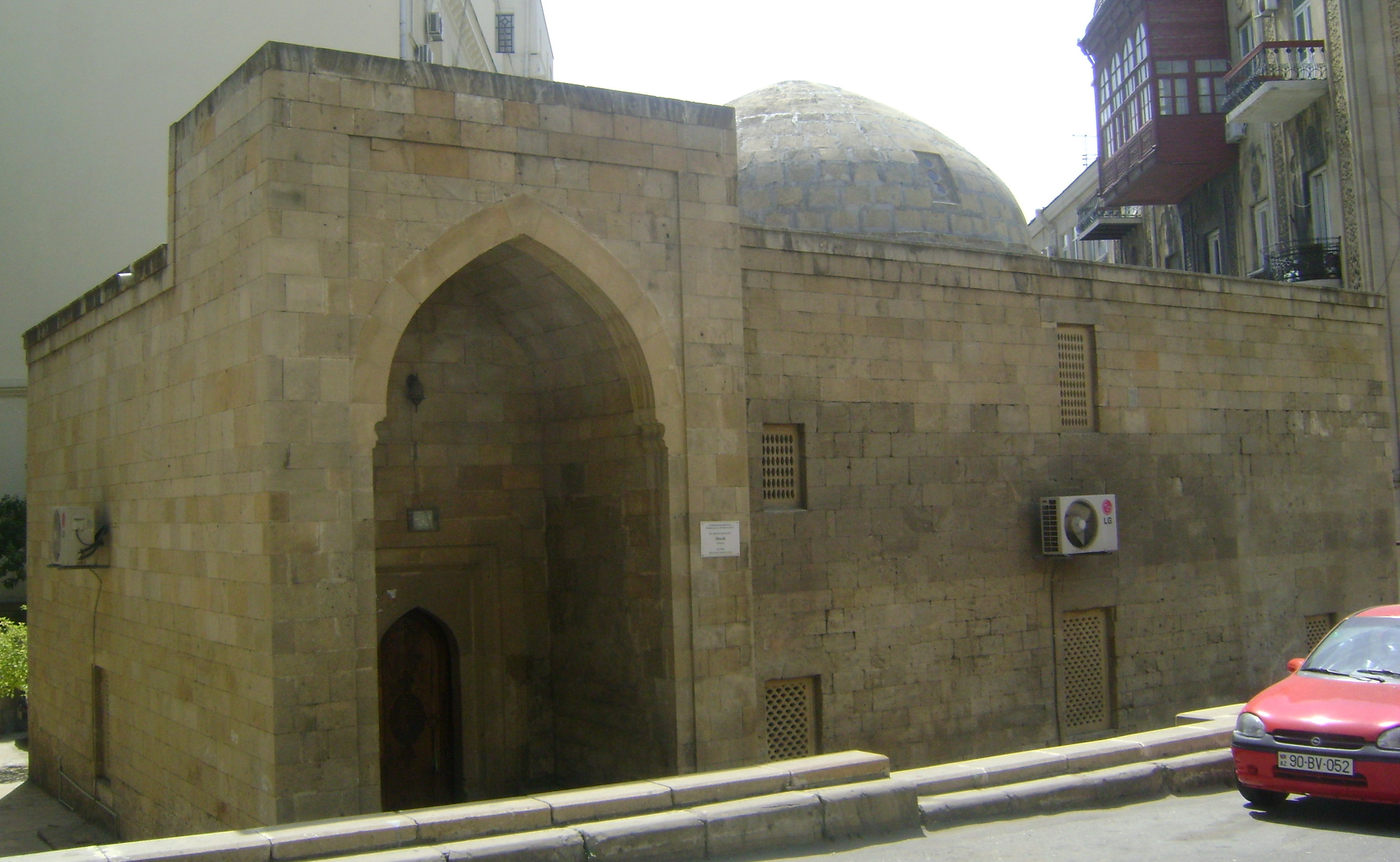

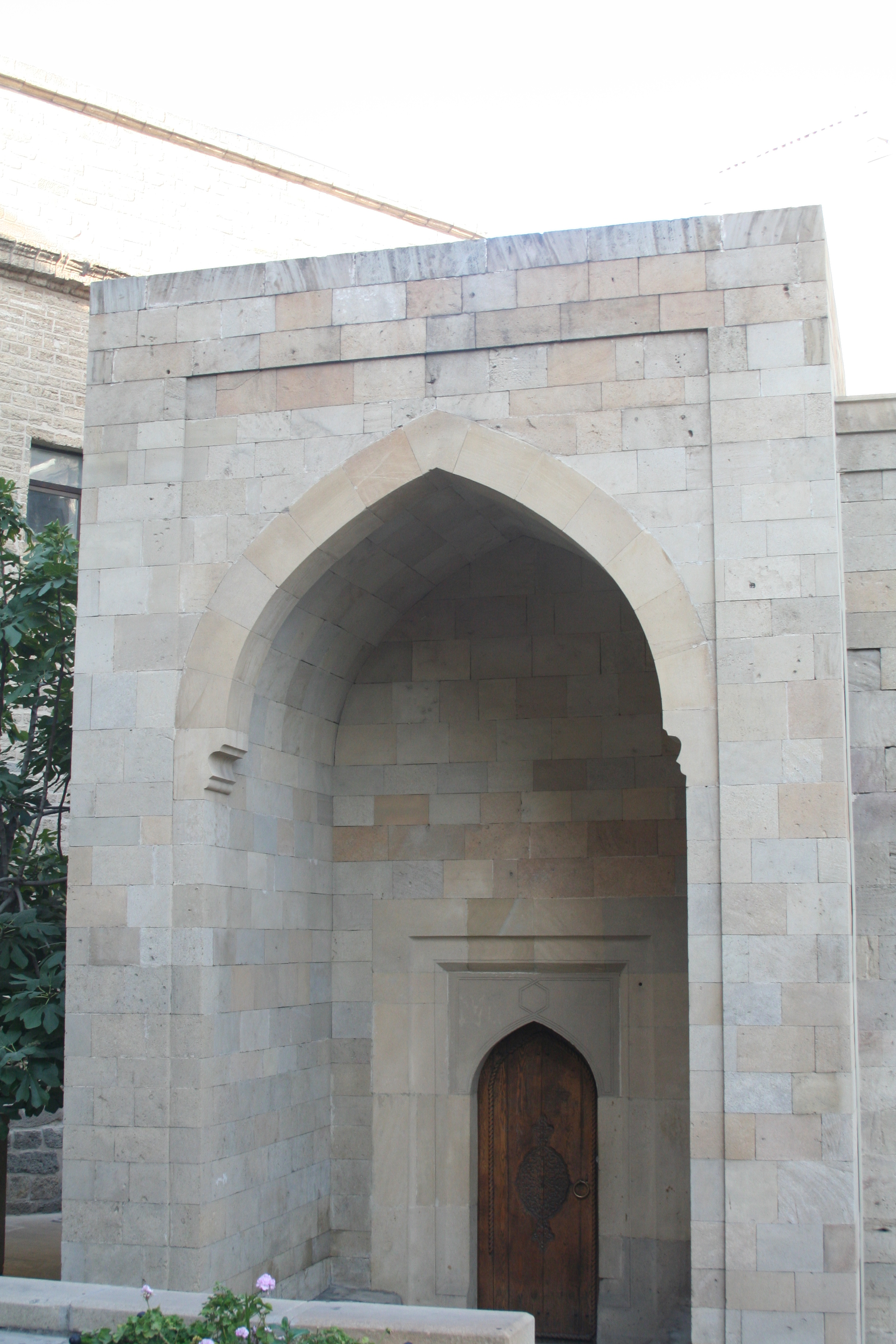

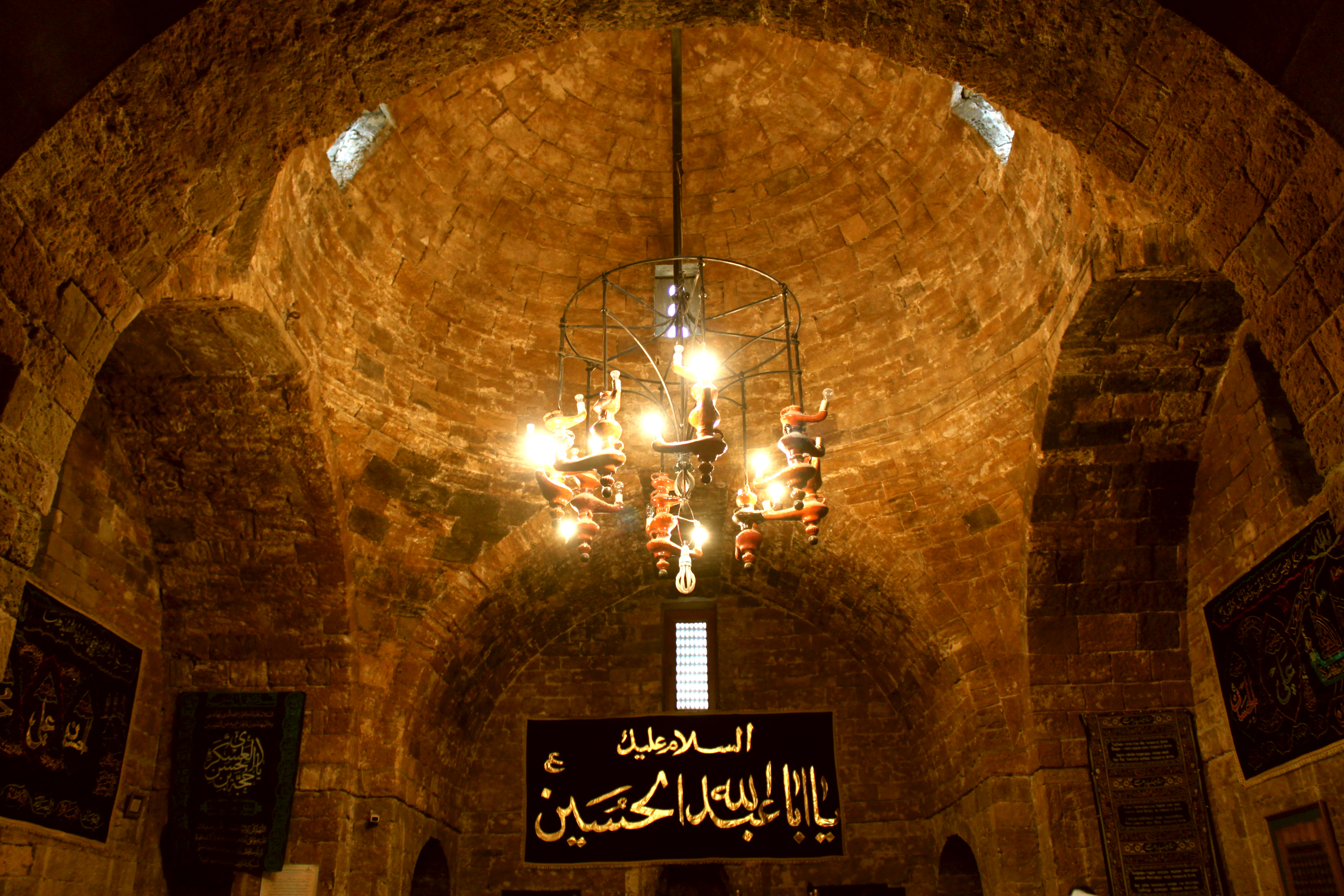

== See also ==
- Islam in Azerbaijan
- List of mosques in Azerbaijan
- List of mosques in Baku
