= Sheikh Ibrahim Mosque =

Mosque in Baku, Azerbaijan

- Azerbaijani: Şeyx İbrahim Məscidi; Persian: مسجد شیخ ابراهیم
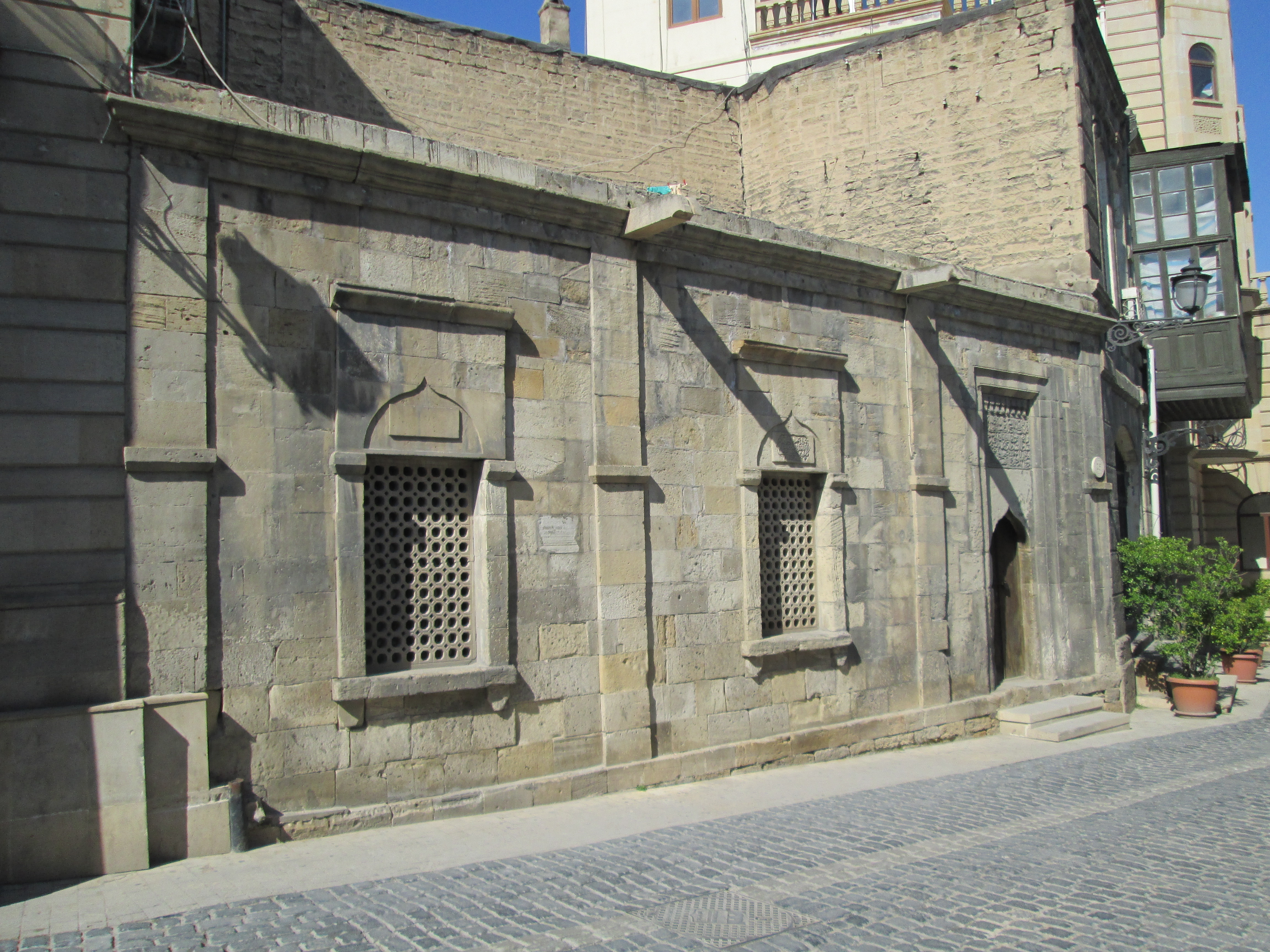

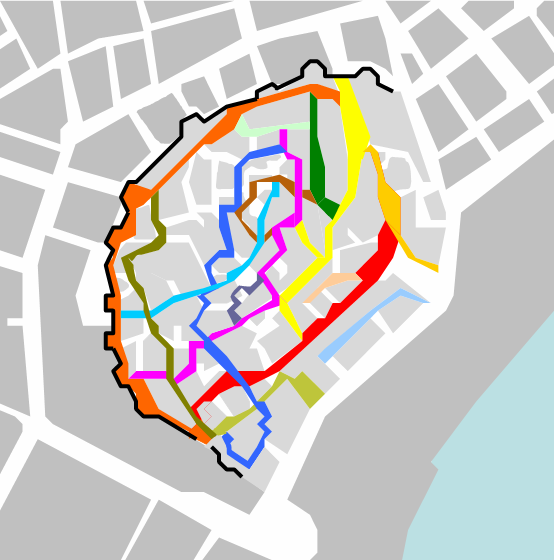
- Location of the mosque in the Baku Old City

Religion
- Affiliation: Islam
- Ecclesiastical or organizational status: Mosque (15th century–1928); Profane use (1928–1991); Madrassa (since c. 1991)
- Status: Active (as a madrassa)

Location
- Location: Old City, Baku
- Country: Azerbaijan
- Interactive map of Sheikh Ibrahim Mosque
- Coordinates: 40°21′53″N 49°50′04″E

Architecture
- Type: Mosque architecture
- Style: Islamic; Shirvan-Absheron
- Founder: Hаji Amirshаh ibn Yаgub
- Completed: 838 AH (1434/1435 CE)

Specifications
- Dome: One
- Inscriptions: Two (maybe more)
- Materials: Stone

The Sheikh Ibrahim Mosque (Azerbaijani: Şeyx İbrahim Məscidi, Persian: مسجد شیخ ابراهیم) is a historical mosque, located on Asaf Zeynalli Street, in the Old City of Baku, in Azerbaijan.

Completed in the 15th century by the Iranian Shirvanshahs, the mosque was designated as an important immovable historical and cultural monument in Azerbaijan by the decision of the Cabinet of Ministers of the Republic of Azerbaijan on August 2, 2001, with the number 132.

During the Soviet occupation, worship in the mosque was halted. Currently, the building of the mosque houses a madrasa, where educational activities are conducted, located near the Jumu'ah Mosque.

== History ==
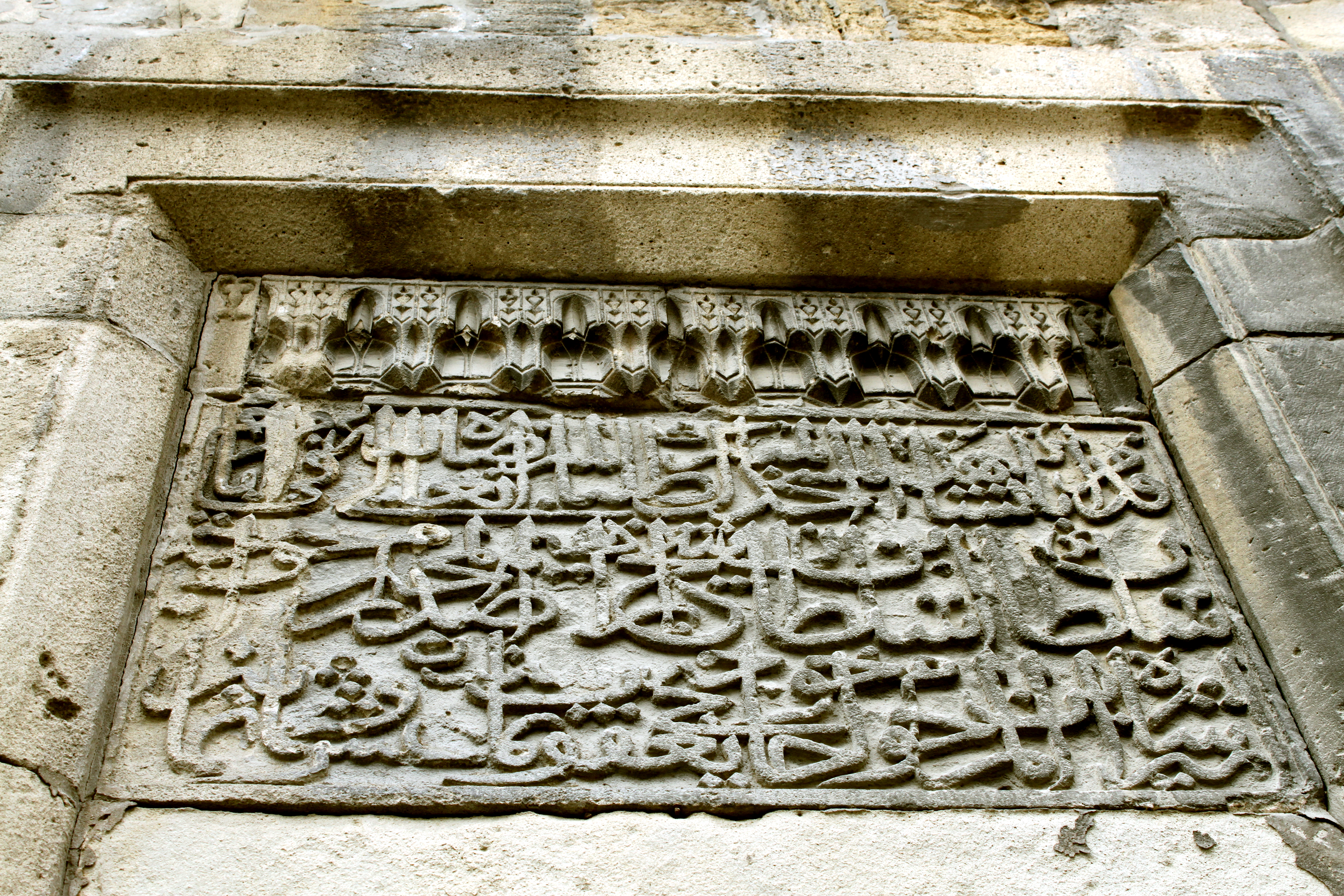
Inscription on the mosque

The Sheikh Ibrahim Mosque was built in 838 AH (1434/1435 CE) (Note: H. Q. 818; M. 13 March 1415 – 29 February 1416.) in the current Asaf Zeynalli Street in the Old City. The inscription on the mosque indicates that it was commissioned by Hаji Amirshаh ibn Yаgub and was constructed during the reign of Shirvanshah I Ibrahim. The mosque is named after Sultan Sheikh Ibrahim, as mentioned in the inscription. The inscription, translated into English, reads:

During the time of Sultan Sheikh Ibrahim ibn Sultan, the late Haji Yaqub, the honorary head of Haji Amir Shah, ordered the construction of this mosque in the year eight hundred and eighteen.

In another inscription, it is indicated that the mosque was restored by Agha Gafar Haji Murad oghlu. In Azerbaijan, after the Soviet occupation, an official struggle against religion began in 1928. In December 1928, the Central Committee of the Communist Party of Azerbaijan handed over many [mosque, churches, and synagogues for educational purposes to the balance of clubs. If there were 3,000 mosques in Azerbaijan in 1917, this number decreased to 1,700 in 1927 and to 17 in 1933. The Sheikh Ibrahim Mosque also ceased its activities after the Soviet occupation.

After Azerbaijan restored its independence, the mosque was included in the list of nationally significant immovable historical and cultural monuments with the decree number 132 issued by the Cabinet of Ministers of the Republic of Azerbaijan on August 2, 2001.

Currently, it is functioning as a madrasa under Juma Mosque.

== Architectural features ==
The mosque is in quadrangle form. It is covered with a stone dome. The Mihrab is a niche indicating the direction of Mecca; however it is not located on the traditional side wall but on the longitudinal wall. In the nineteenth century, the surface of the façade wall of the mosque was divided into three quadrangular frames. It led the façade to get the shape of the architectural school of Europe. Within each frame, windows were installed, which were completed with cracks and the entrance were developed in the form of portal. The ancient content of the national cultural monument is kept and national and European motifs are combined as a united architectural platform. Each frame contains a window with a completed arch, and the entrance is designed in a portal form.

== See also ==
- Islam in Azerbaijan
- List of mosques in Azerbaijan
- List of mosques in Baku
