= Khidir Mosque =

Mosque in Baku, Azerbaijan

- Azerbaijani: Xıdır Məscidi; Persian: مسجد خدیر
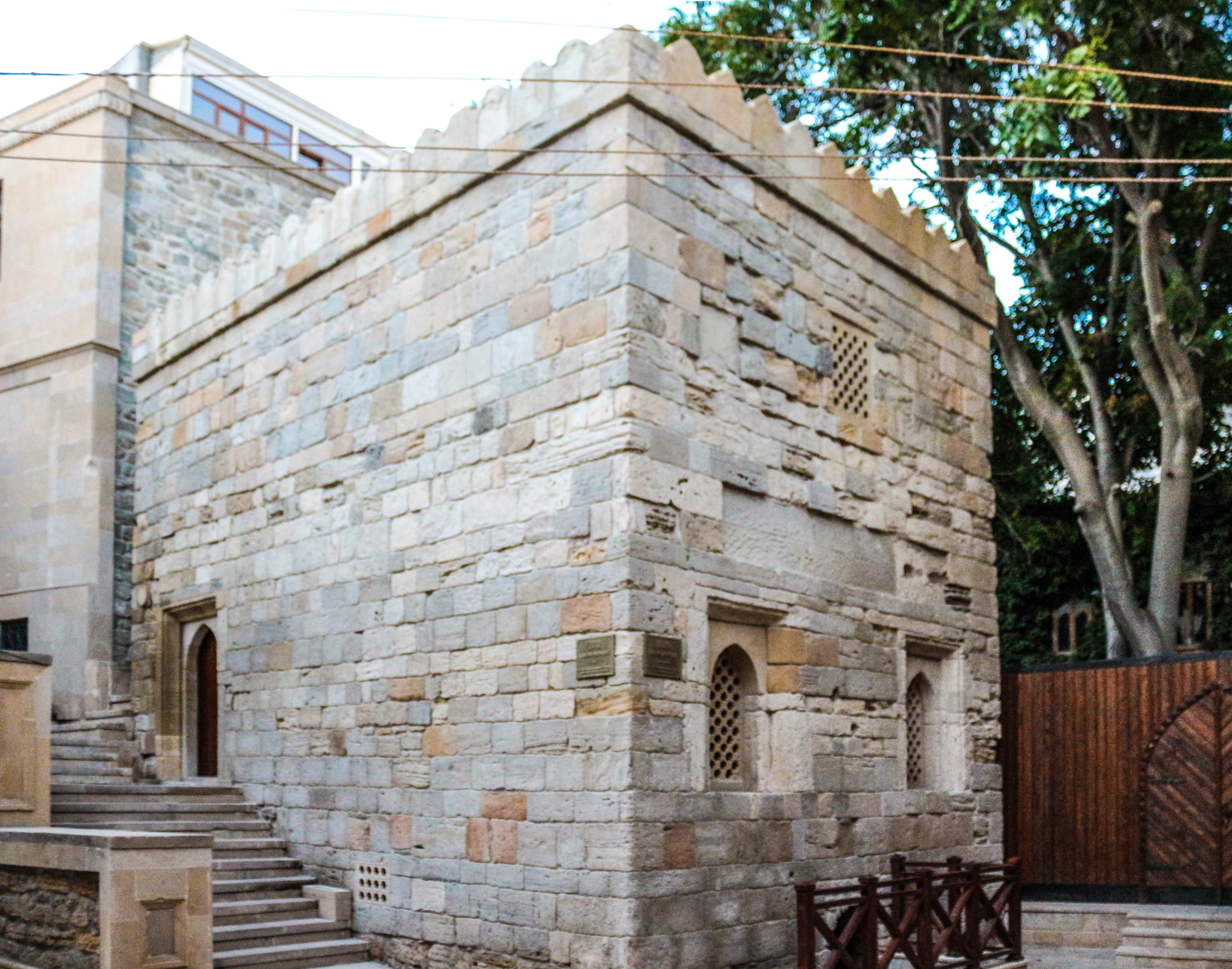
- The former mosque in 2016

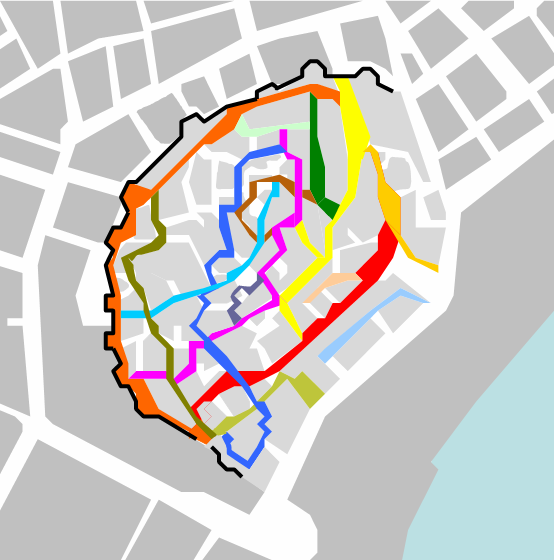
- Location of the former mosque in the Baku Old City

Religion
- Affiliation: Islam (former)
- Ecclesiastical or organizational status: Mosque (1301–1928); Profane use (1928–1991)
- Status: Abandoned (as a mosque); Restored

Location
- Location: Old City, Baku
- Country: Azerbaijan
- Interactive map of Khidir Mosque
- Coordinates: 40°21′54″N 49°50′03″E

Architecture
- Type: Mosque architecture
- Style: Islamic; Shirvan-Absheron
- Completed: 1301 CE

Specifications
- Dome: One
- Materials: Stone

The Khidir Mosque (Azerbaijani: Xıdır Məscidi, Persian: مسجد خدیر) is a former mosque, located on Muslim Magomayev street, in the Old City of Baku, in Azerbaijan. Completed in the 14th century by the Iranian Shirvanshahs, the building was registered as a national architectural monument by the decision of the Cabinet of Ministers of the Republic of Azerbaijan dated August 2, 2001, No. 132.

== History ==
The mosque was built in 1301 on a street-stair. In turn, it affected the way of the architectural placement of the mosque.

In 1988, archaeological excavations on the lower floor of the dome and restoration works on the portal were carried out. The mosque was built on Zoroastrian temple.

== Architecture ==
Proportional division of the interior, composition methods and stone elements are clearly expressed with vividly carving, and with mihrab with artistic expression the hall gets an interesting view. Straight profiled windows are installed on the south façade of the mosque. Through the whole perimeter of the mosque, the low-profiled crown expresses the methods of eastern composition.

== Gallery ==
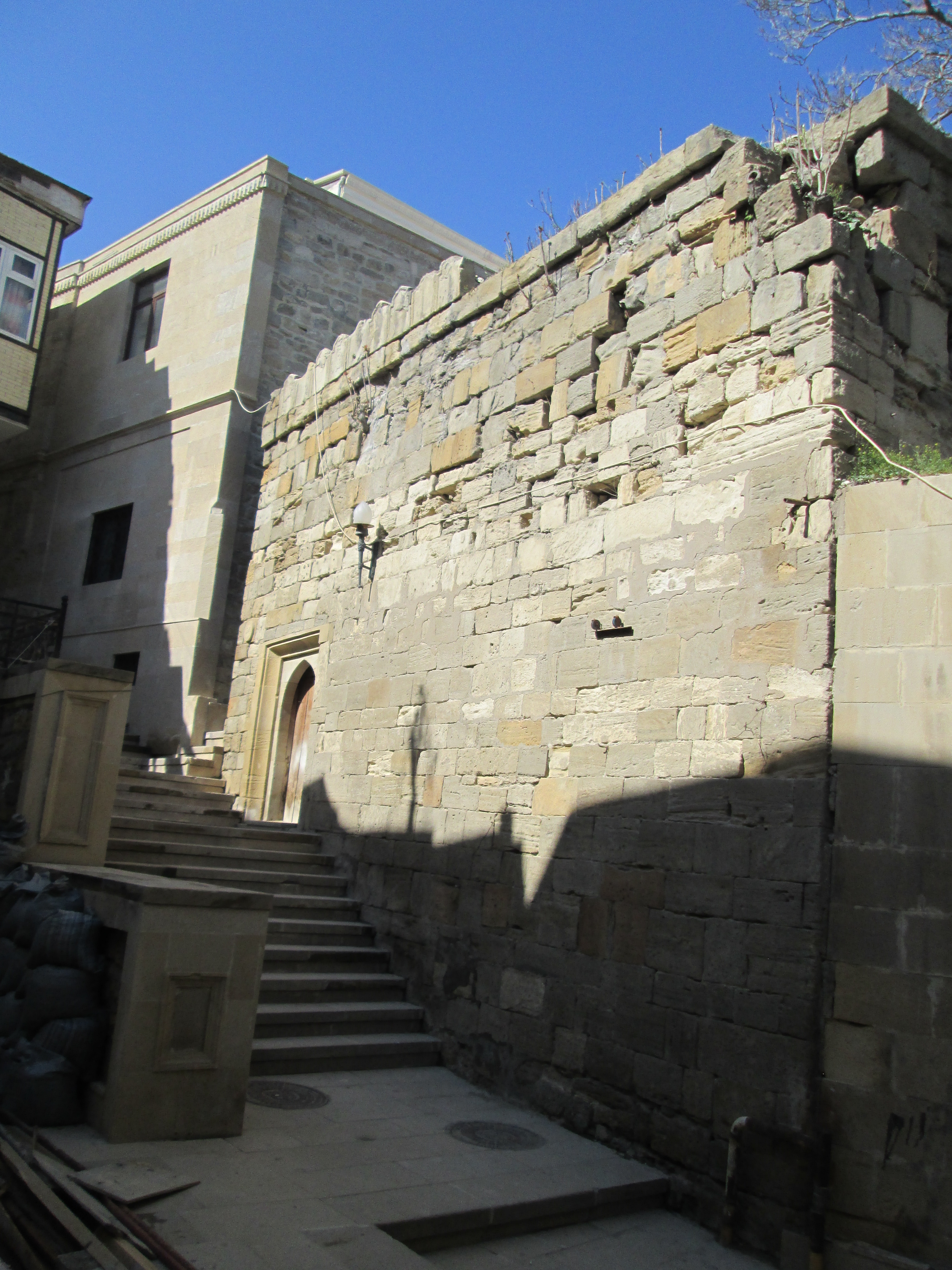

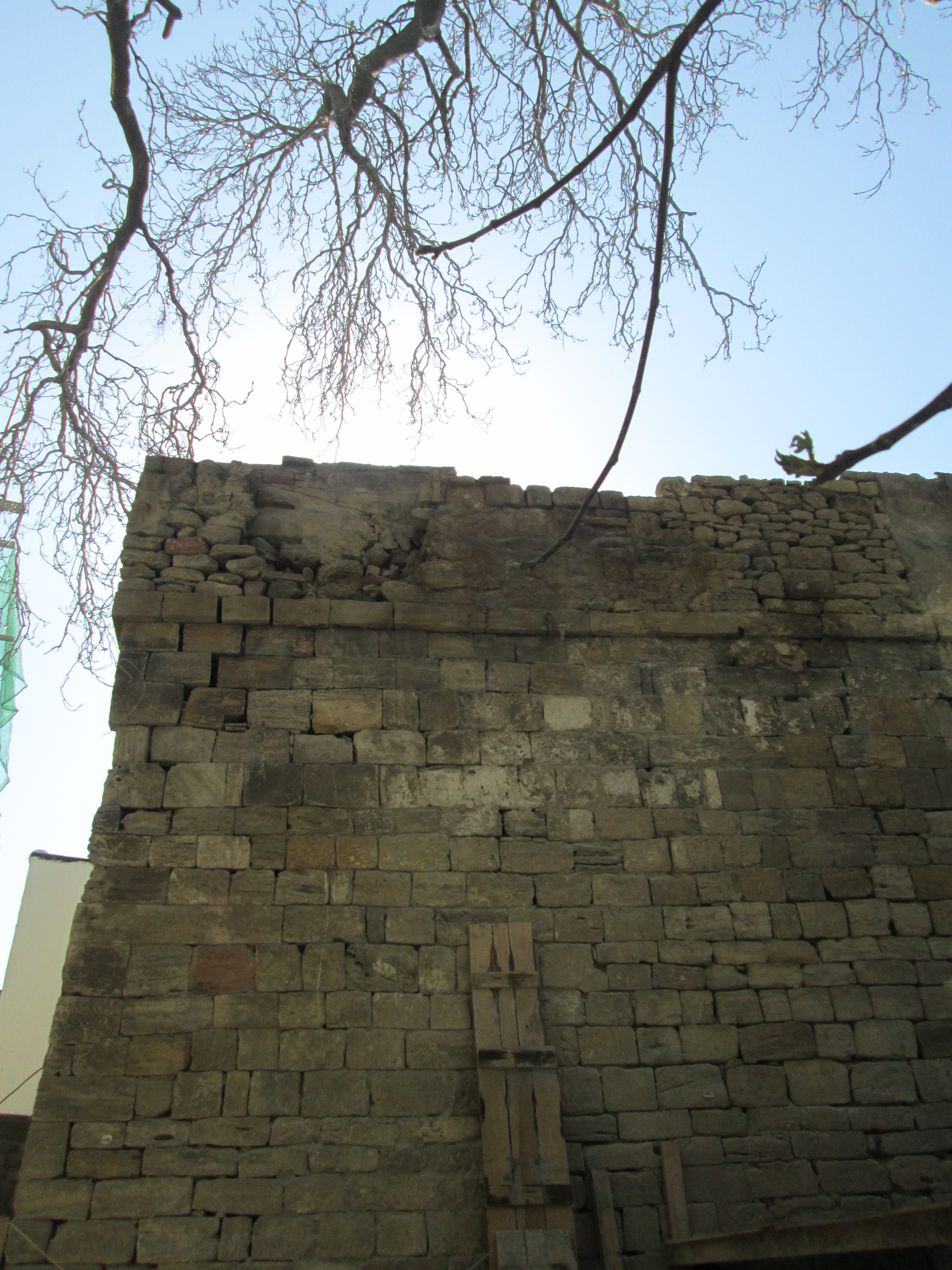

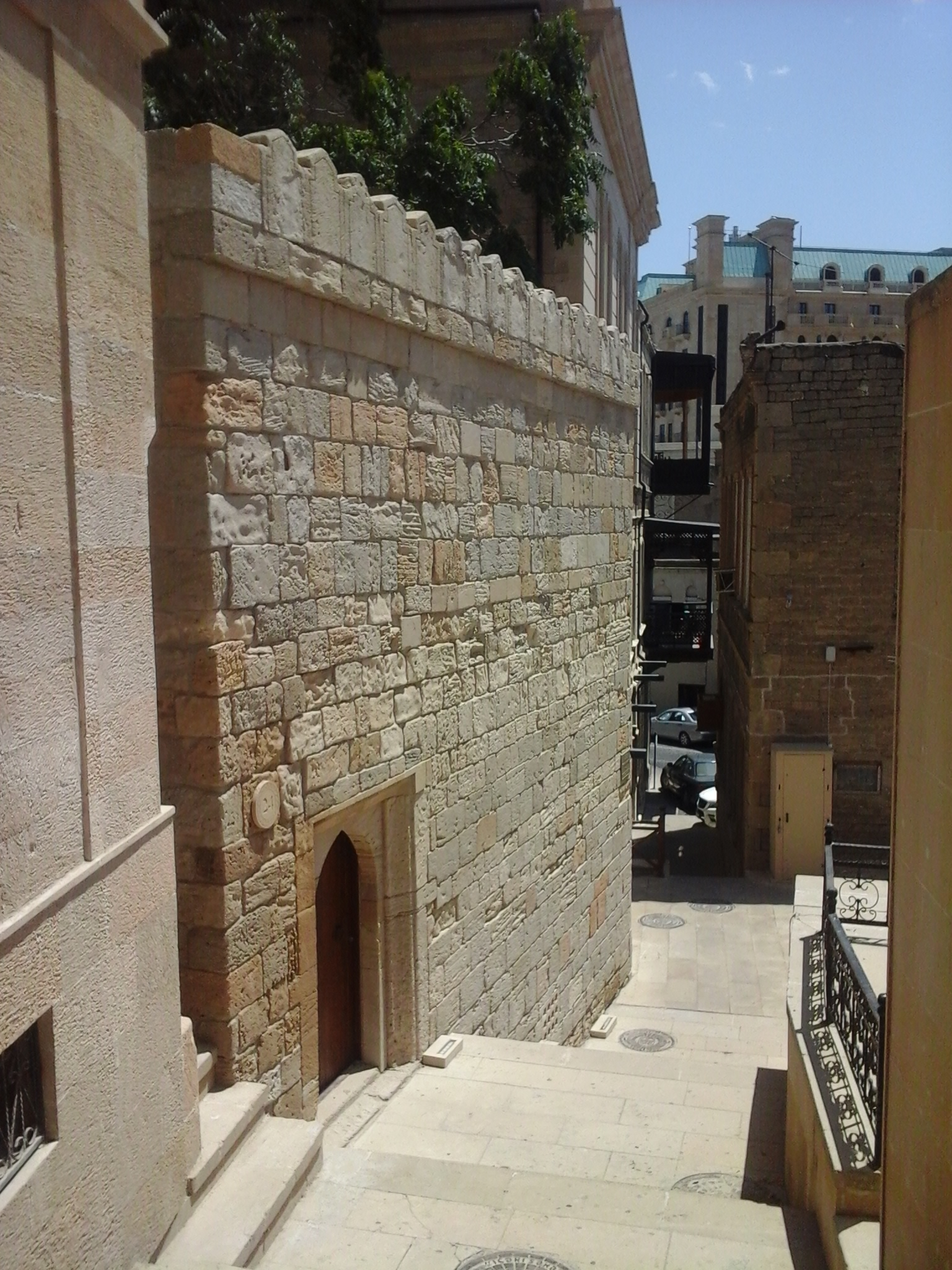

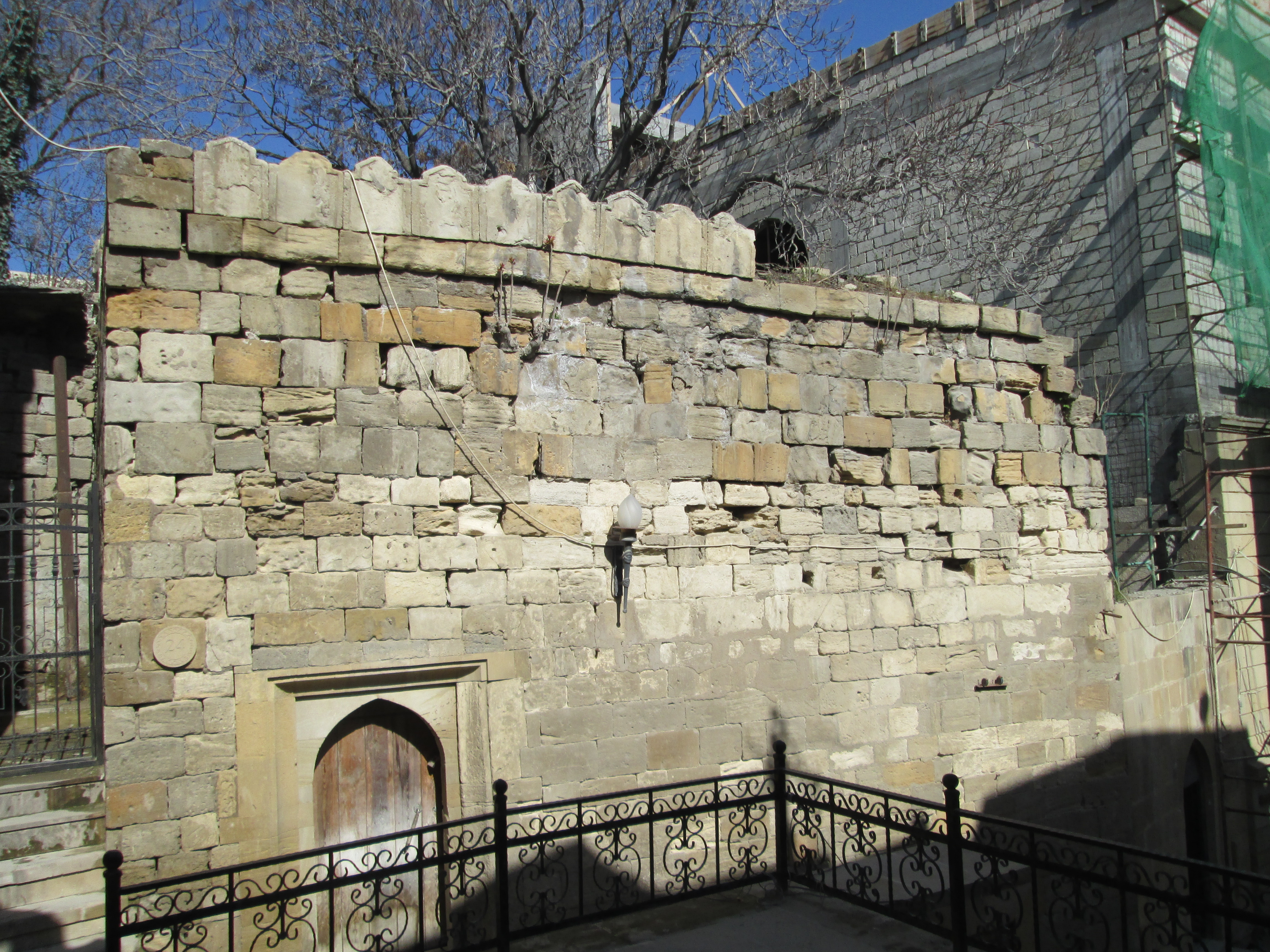

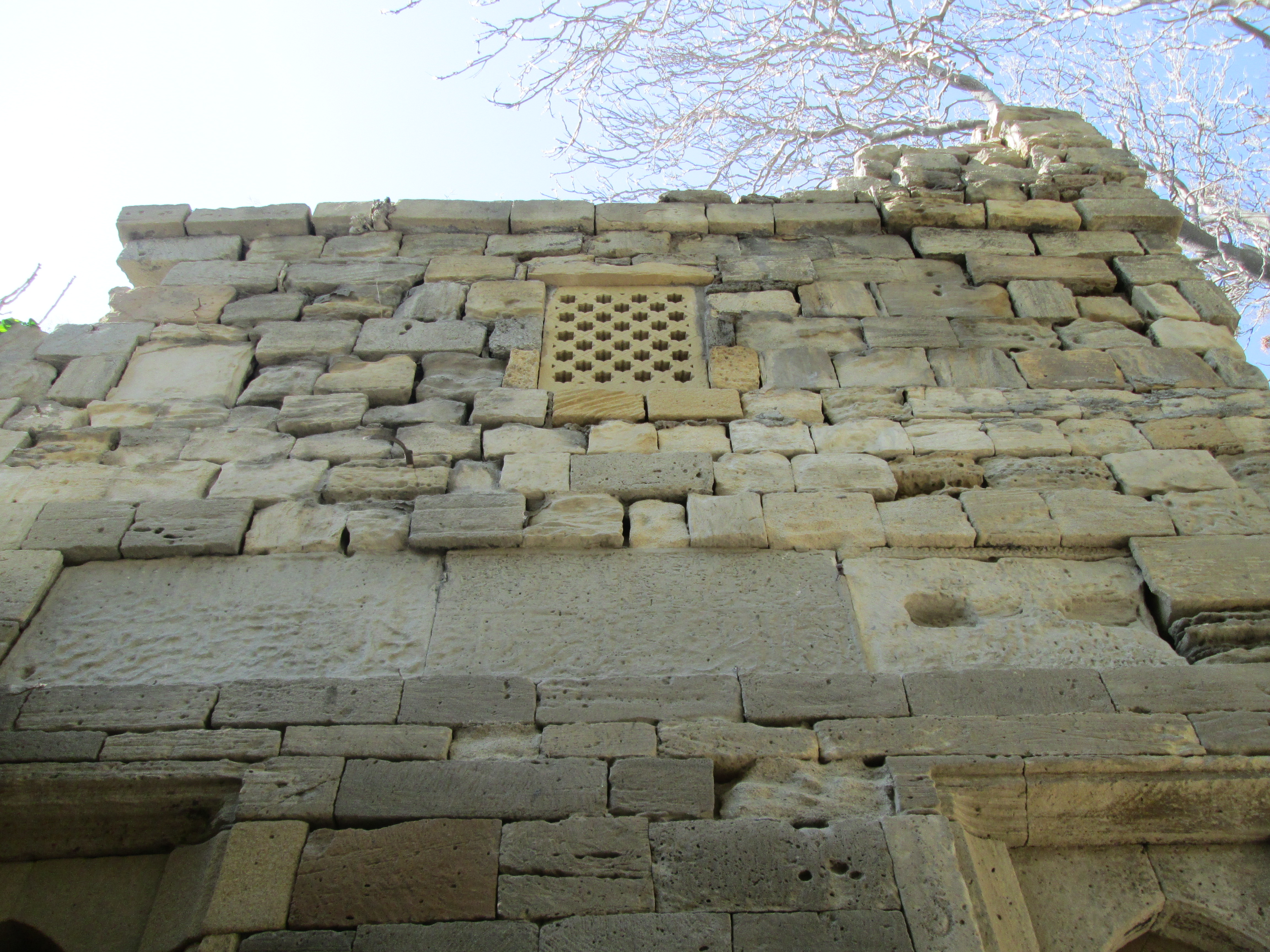

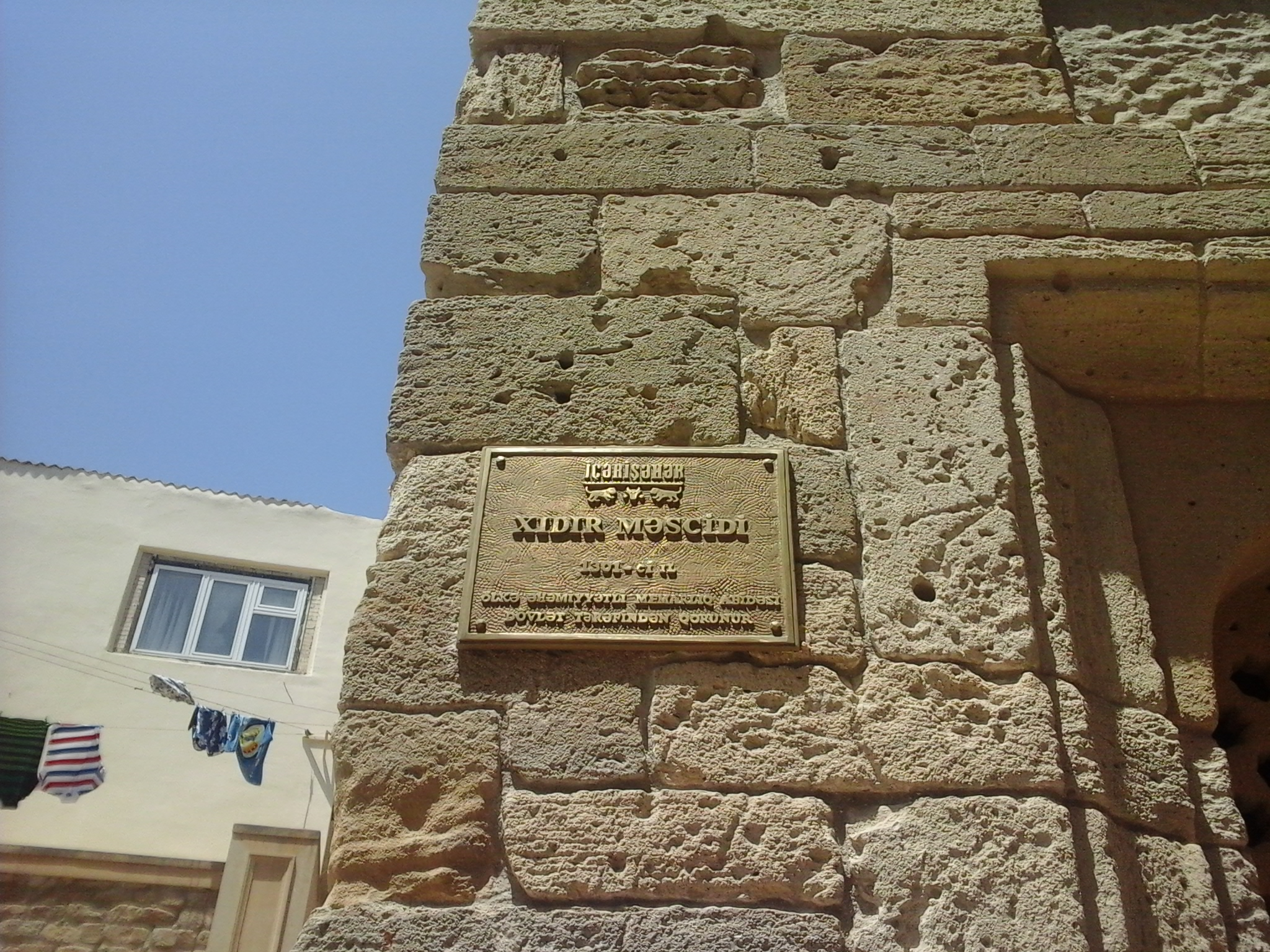

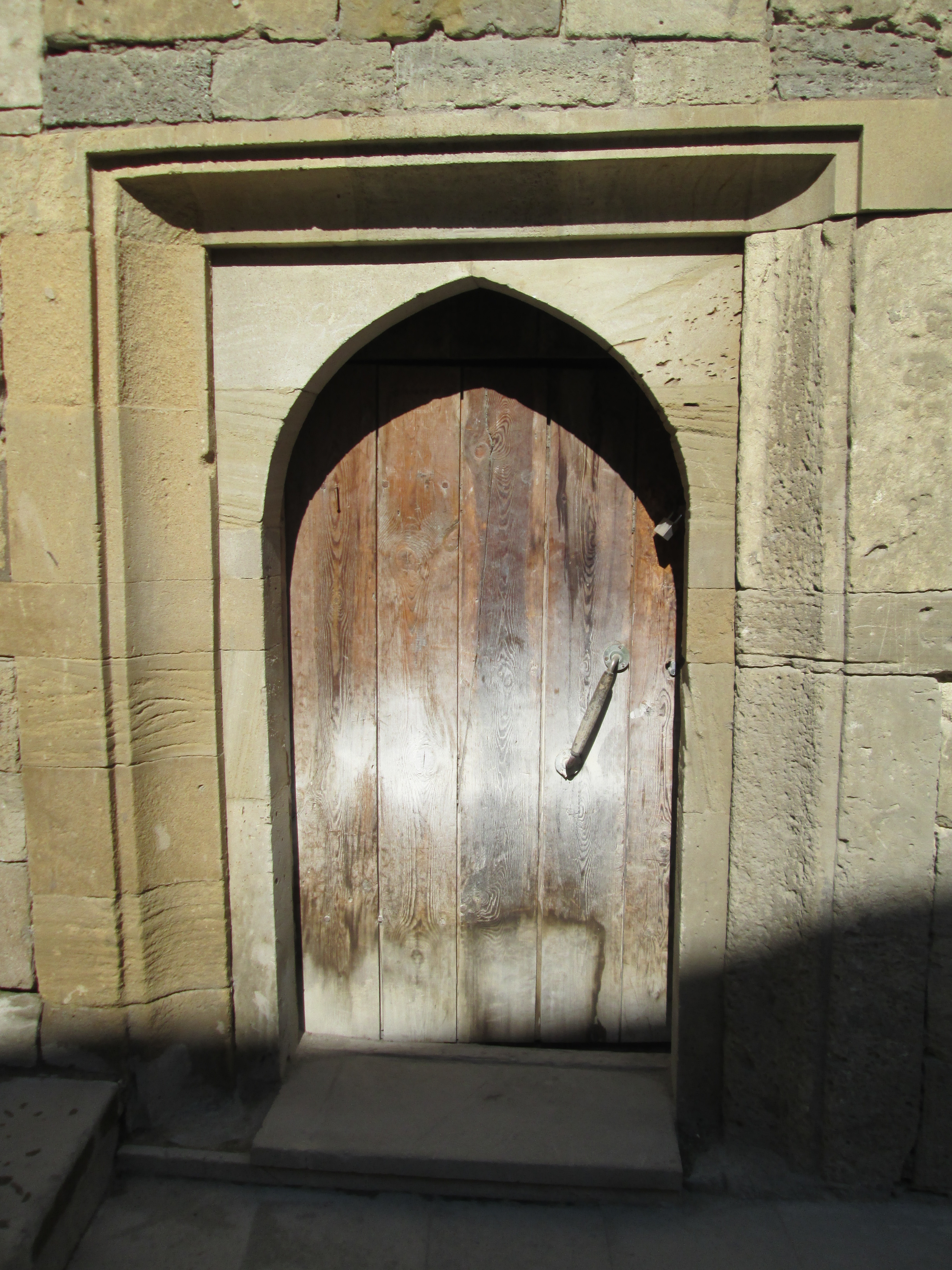

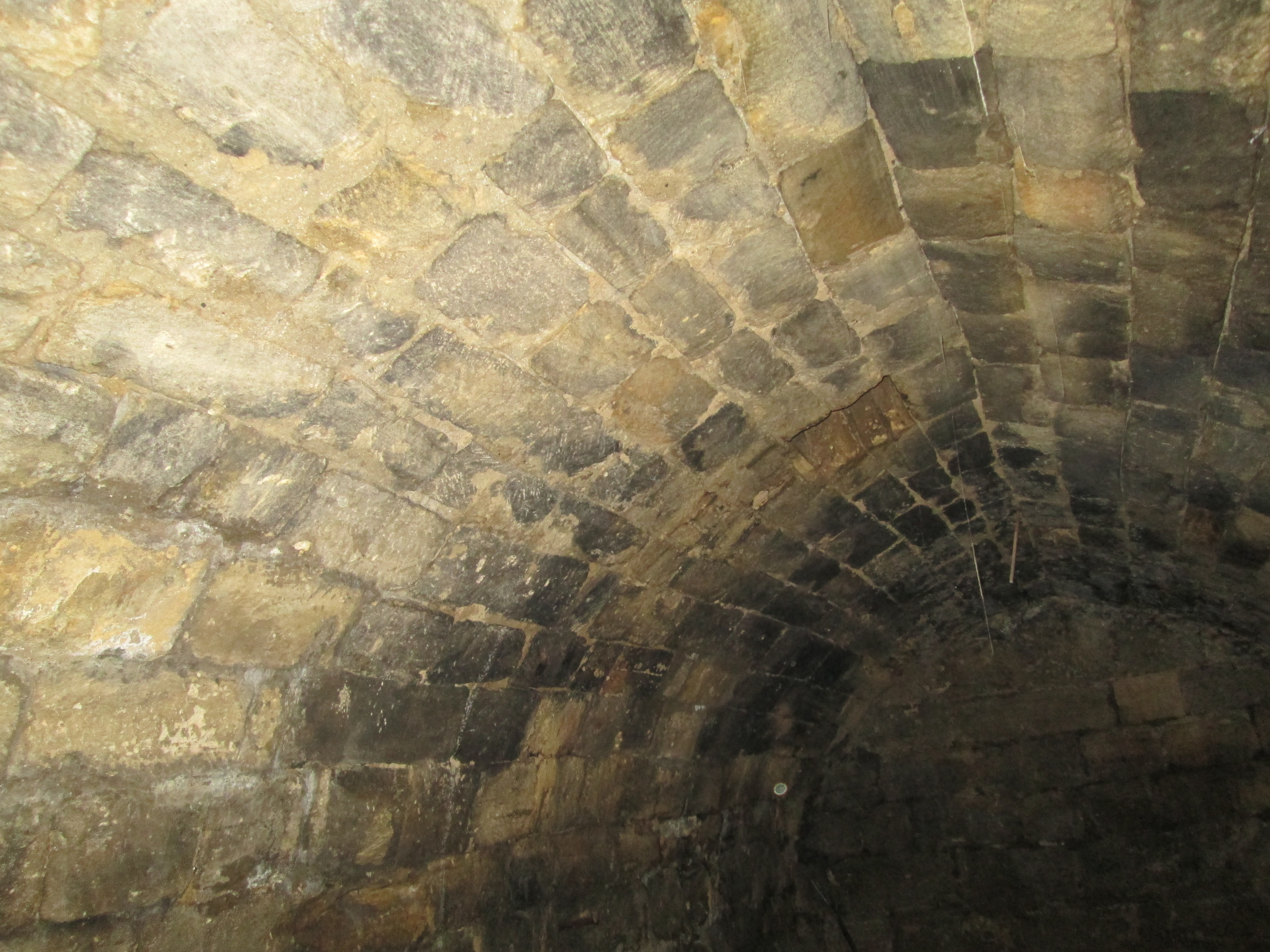

== See also ==
- Islam in Azerbaijan
- List of mosques in Azerbaijan
