= Haji Heybat Mosque =

Former mosque in Baku, Azerbaijan

Haji Heybat mosque
- Azerbaijani: Hacı Heybət məscidi
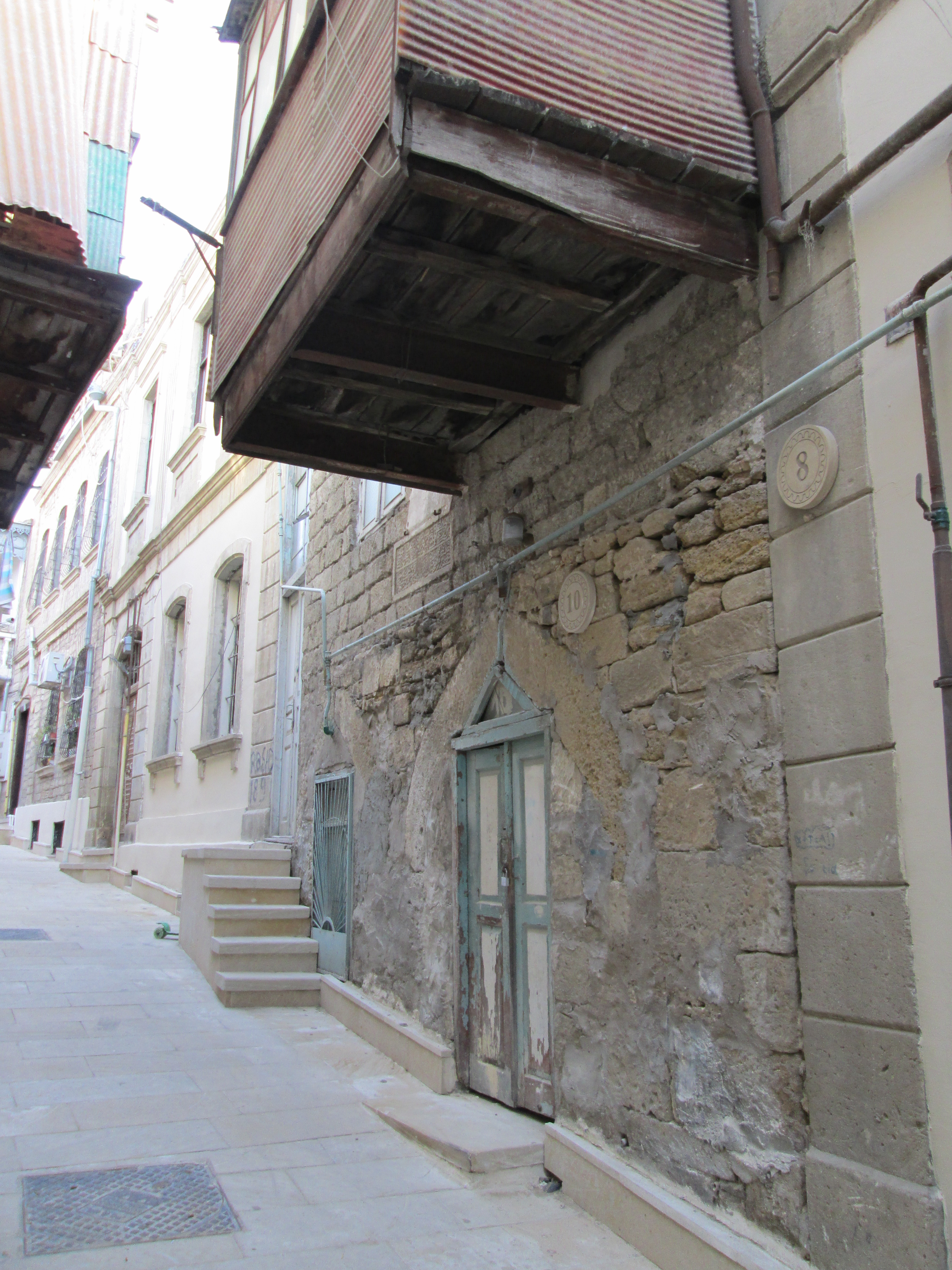
- Entrance to the former mosque in 2015

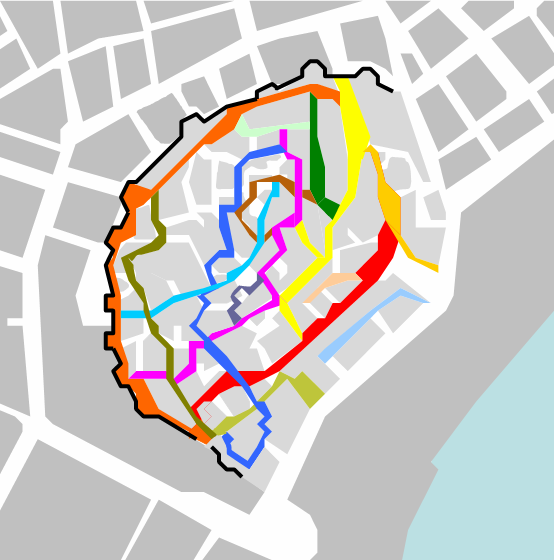
- Location of the former mosque in the Baku Old City

Religion
- Affiliation: Islam (former)
- Ecclesiastical or organizational status: Mosque (1791–1928); Profane use (since 1928)
- Status: Abandoned (as a mosque); Restored

Location
- Location: Old City, Baku
- Country: Azerbaijan
- Interactive map of Haji Heybat mosque
- Coordinates: 40°22′02″N 49°50′00″E

Architecture
- Architect: Haji Heybat ibn Amir Ali
- Type: Mosque architecture
- Style: Islamic; Shirvan-Absheron
- Completed: 1206 AH (1791/1792 CE)

Specifications
- Dome: One
- Materials: Stone

The Haji Heybat mosque (Azerbaijani: Hacı Heybət məscidi) is a former mosque, located on Kichik Gala street, in the Old City of Baku, in Azerbaijan.

The mosque was built in 1206 AH (1791/1792 CE), designed by architect Hаji Hеybat Amir Ali оghlu.

== Architecture ==
The mosque is small, and it is on the row of neighborhoods. In plan, the mosque is in the form of a quadrangle. It consists of a square shaped vestibule, a service room and a worshipping room with niches.

The architectural structure of the mosque is in a local style. The mosque has a stone domes and pointed arches. Simply expressed entrance with crown and epigraphic inscriptions on topics of Quran and information about the architect of the monument indicate the value of the mosque. In the interior of the worshipping room, in one of the corners, there is a grave of the architect and his wife.

== Gallery ==
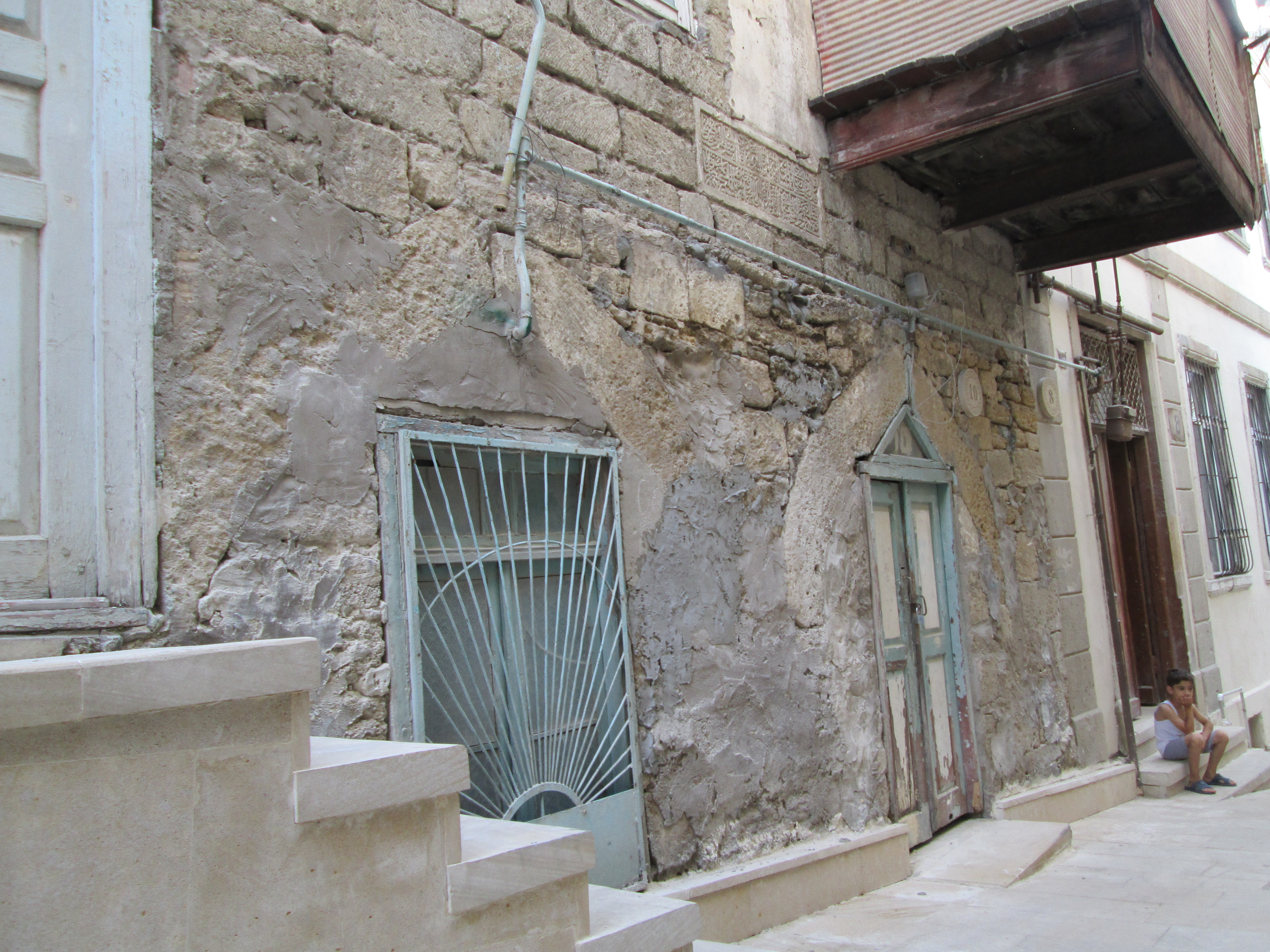

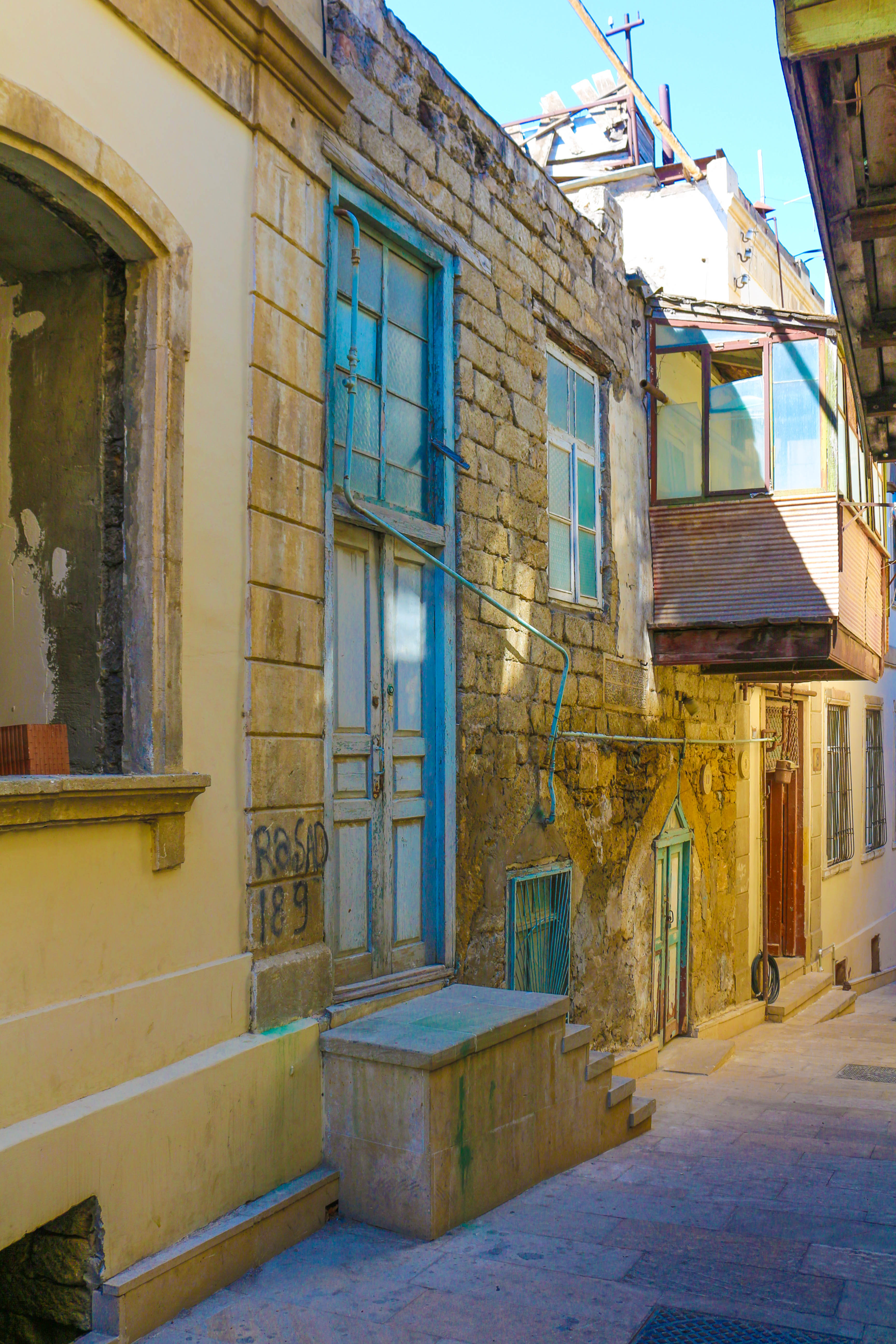

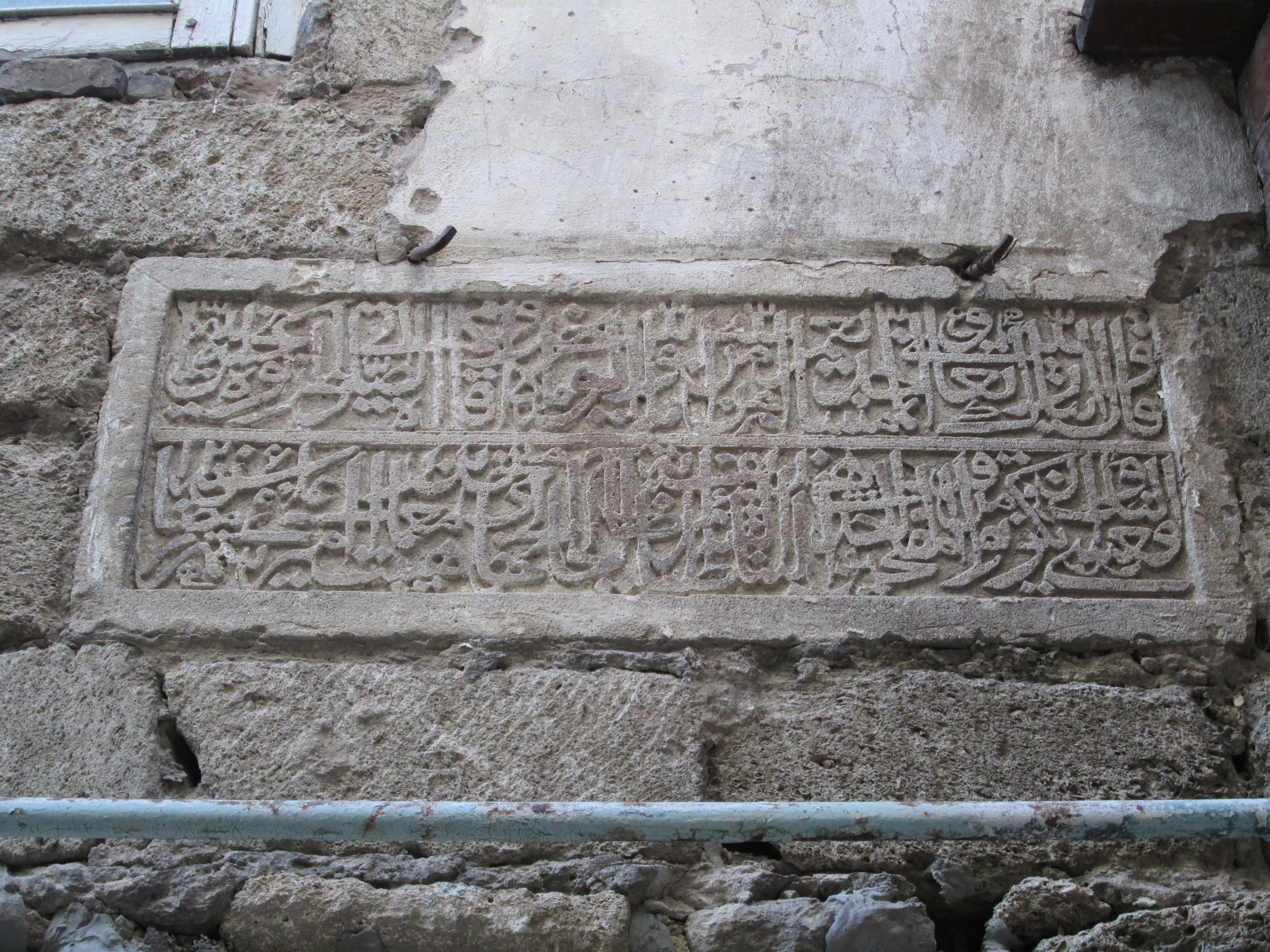

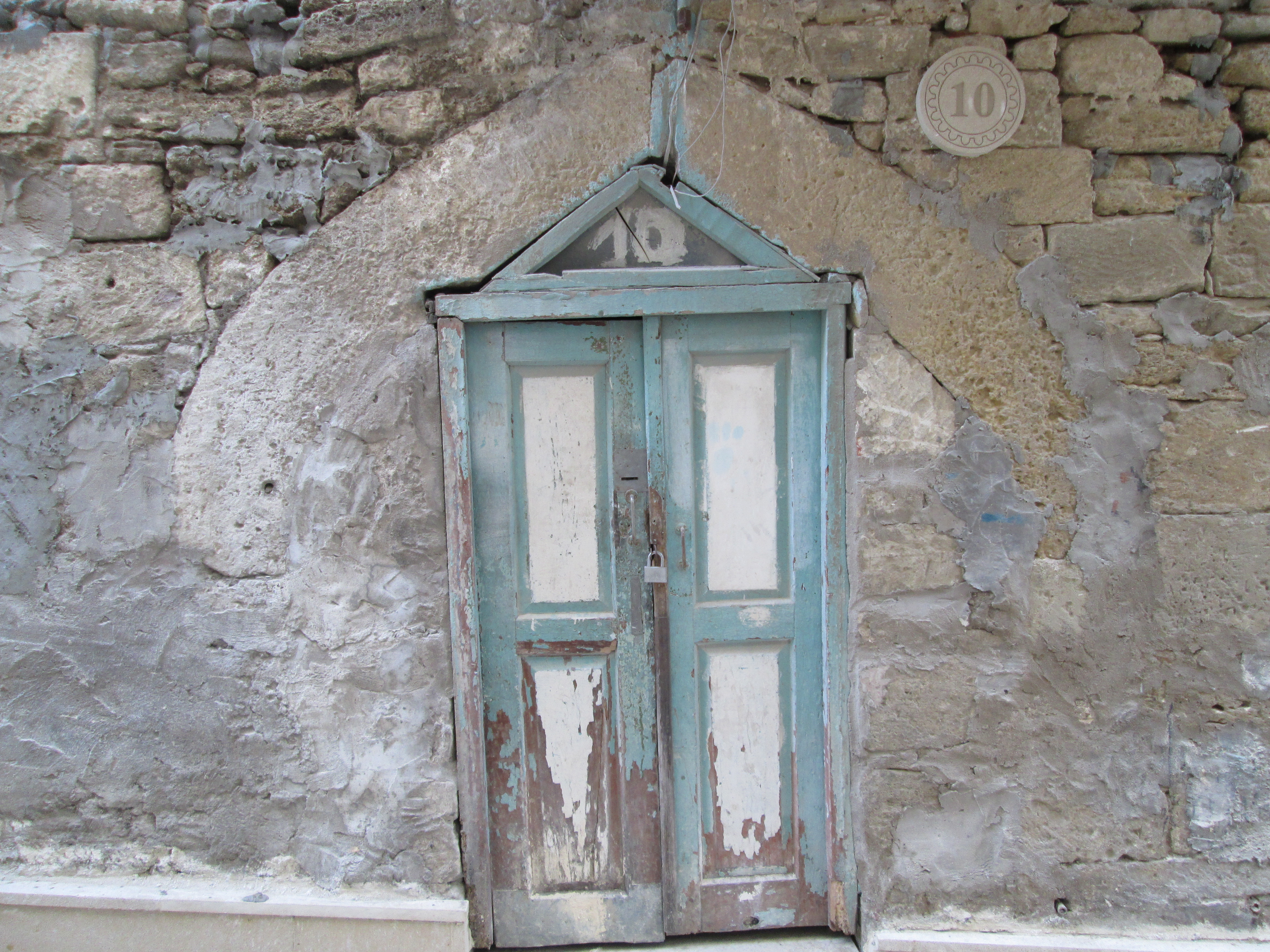

== See also ==
- Islam in Azerbaijan
- List of mosques in Azerbaijan
