= Dara Bathhouse =

- Azerbaijani: Dərə hamam
- Interactive map of the Dara Bathhouse area

General information
- Type: Bath
- Architectural style: Azerbaijani architecture
- Location: Shaki, Azerjaijan, 5 Huseyn Akbarov Str.
- Completed: XIX century

UNESCO World Heritage Site
- Official name: Historic Centre of Sheki with the Khan’s Palace
- Criteria: Cultural: (ii), (v)
- Designated: 2019 (43rd session)
- Reference no.: 1549
- Region: Western Asia
- Area: 120.5 ha
- Buffer Zone: 146 ha

Dara Bathhouse or Dara Hamam (Azerbaijani: Dərə hamam) is a 19th-century monument in Sheki. It is located on the territory of the Historical and Architectural Reserve "Yukhary Bash". It is currently in an unusable condition. By the Decree of the Cabinet of Ministers of the Republic of Azerbaijan No 132 dated with 2 August 2001, the building is protected by state and is included in the list of the architectural monuments.

== History ==
In 1870, the businessman Mammadnabi ordered the construction of the Dara Bathhouse at a depth of 6 meters. The bathhouse consists of two large halls and utility rooms. It has a saloon, called outdoor or external, and a number of other bathing rooms. The locker rooms are connected to the bathing salon through utility rooms. Each saloon is covered with a dome on the top, in which small holes are made for the light to enter. Pools with cold and hot water are connected to utility rooms on the opposite side of the soap section. These pools are called "khazina". The water for the bath was supplied through clay pipes from a nearby old water pipe. The bath functioned until the 1980s. Its total area is 89 m^{2} (960 sq ft) It consists of a dressing room, a bath, a room and a corridor. The area of the dressing room is 120 m^{2} (1,300 sq ft), (10 metres (33 ft) wide, 12 metres (39 ft) long, and 13 metres (43 ft) high). The room size is 12 m^{2} (130 sq ft) (3 metres (9.8 ft) wide, 4 metres (13 ft) long). The bath's area is 50 square metres (540 sq ft), 5 m (16 ft) wide, 10 m (33 ft) long, and 8 metres (26 ft) high. The area of the first special room is 25 m^{2} (270 sq ft), 5 by 5 metres (16 ft × 16 ft). The area of the second special room is 7.5 square metres (81 sq ft), 2.5 by 2.5 metres (8 ft 2 in × 8 ft 2 in). The total area is 89 m^{2} (960 sq ft) with 80-centimetre (31 in) thick walls. From the outside, the building is 6 metres (20 ft) below the ground level.

Due to the recent disuse, the bath has fallen into disrepair, there is a danger of its destruction.
