= Architecture of Azerbaijan =

The architecture of Azerbaijan (Azerbaijani: Azərbaycan memarlığı) refers to the architecture development in what now constitutes the territory of the Republic of Azerbaijan.

The architecture in Azerbaijan typically combines elements of East and West. Many medieval structures such as the Maiden Tower and Palace of the Shirvanshahs in the walled city of Baku survive in modern Azerbaijan.

Among other medieval architectural treasures reflecting the influence of several schools are the Shirvan shahs' palace in Baku, the Palace of Shaki Khans in the town of Shaki in north-central Azerbaijan, the Surakhany Temple on the Apsheron Peninsula, a number of bridges spanning the Aras River, and several mausoleums. In the nineteenth and early twentieth centuries, little monumental architecture was created, but distinctive residences were built in Baku and elsewhere. Among the most recent architectural monuments, the Baku subways are noted for their lavish decor. The urban planning and architectural activities are regulated by the State Committee for City Building and Architecture of Azerbaijan Republic.

== Palaces ==
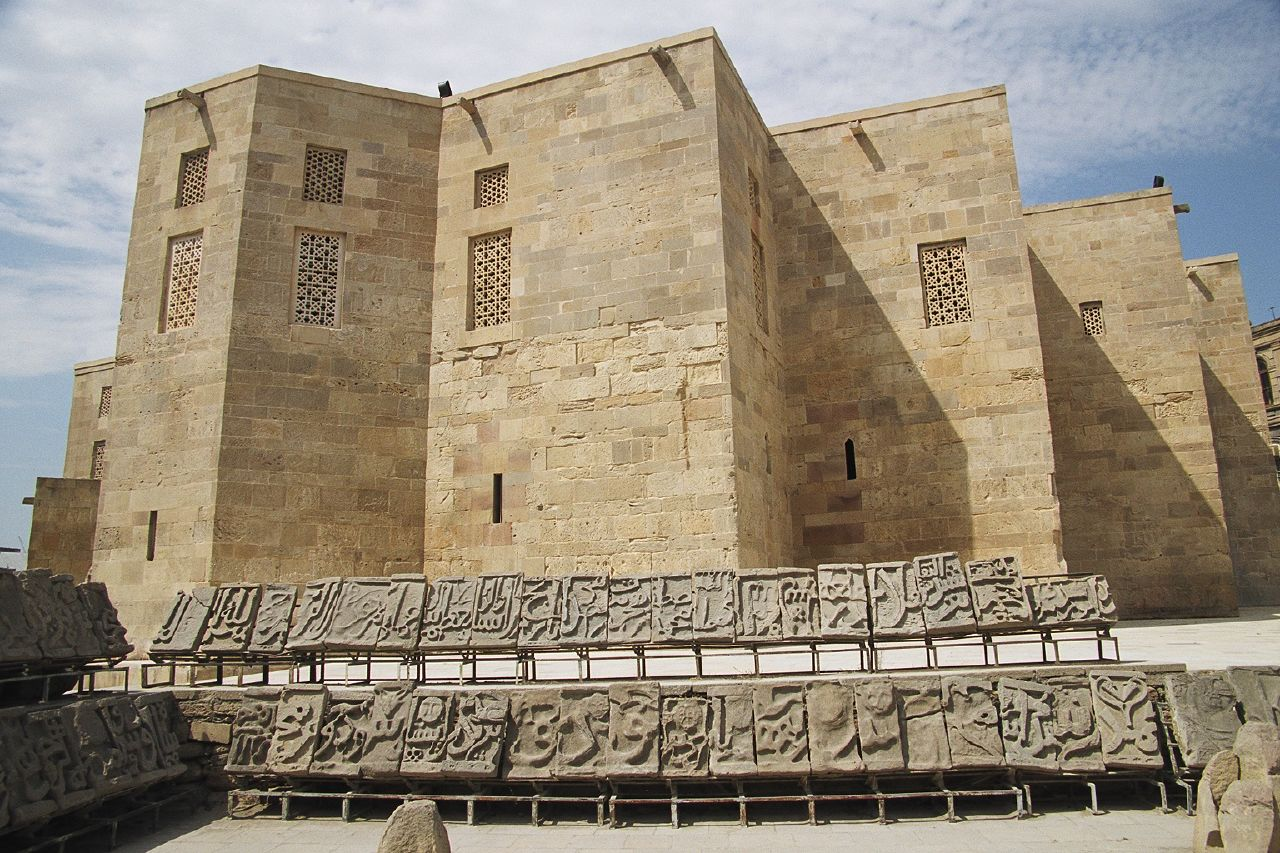
Palace of the Shirvanshahs, Baku

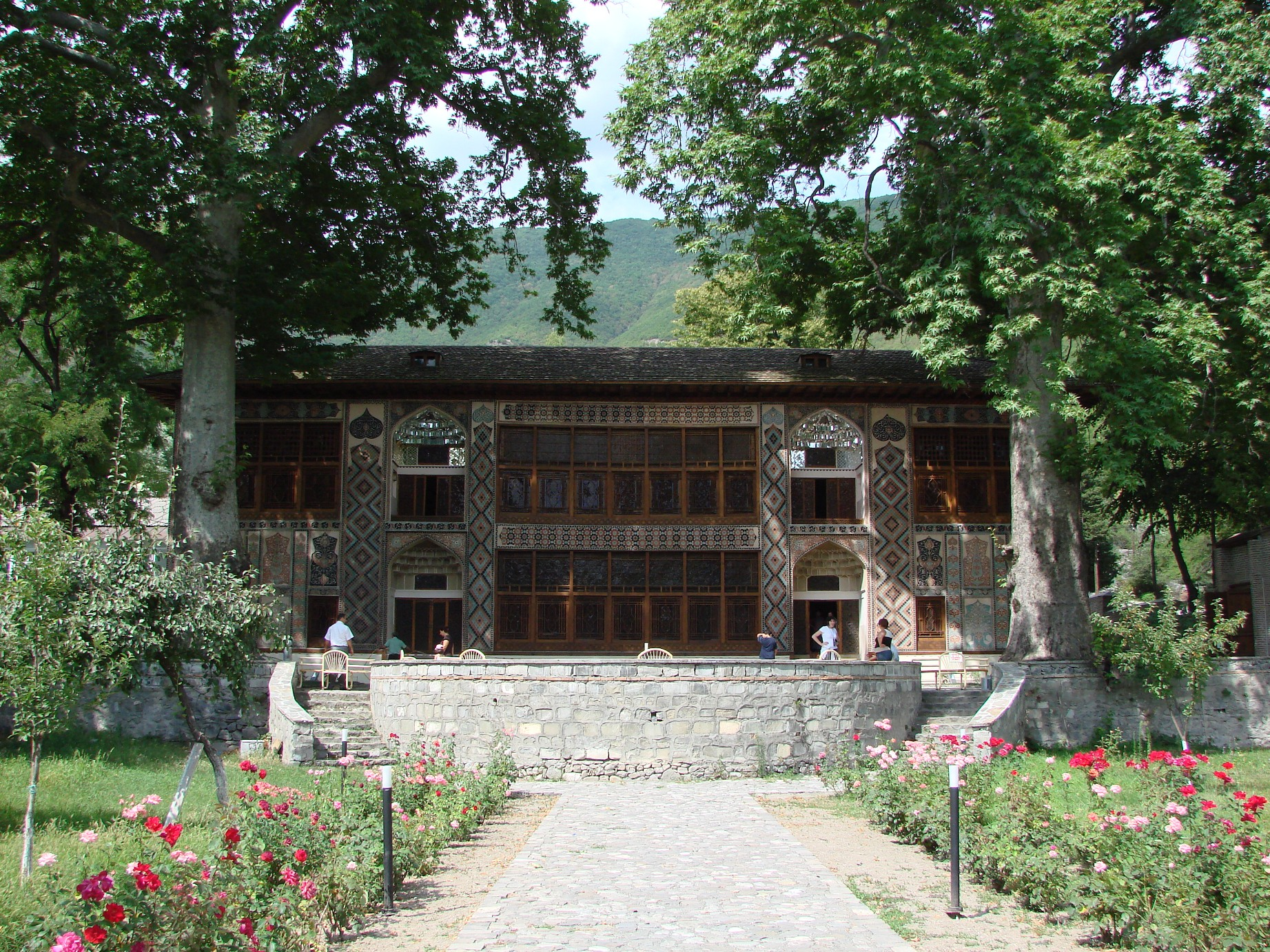
Palace of Shaki Khans, Shaki

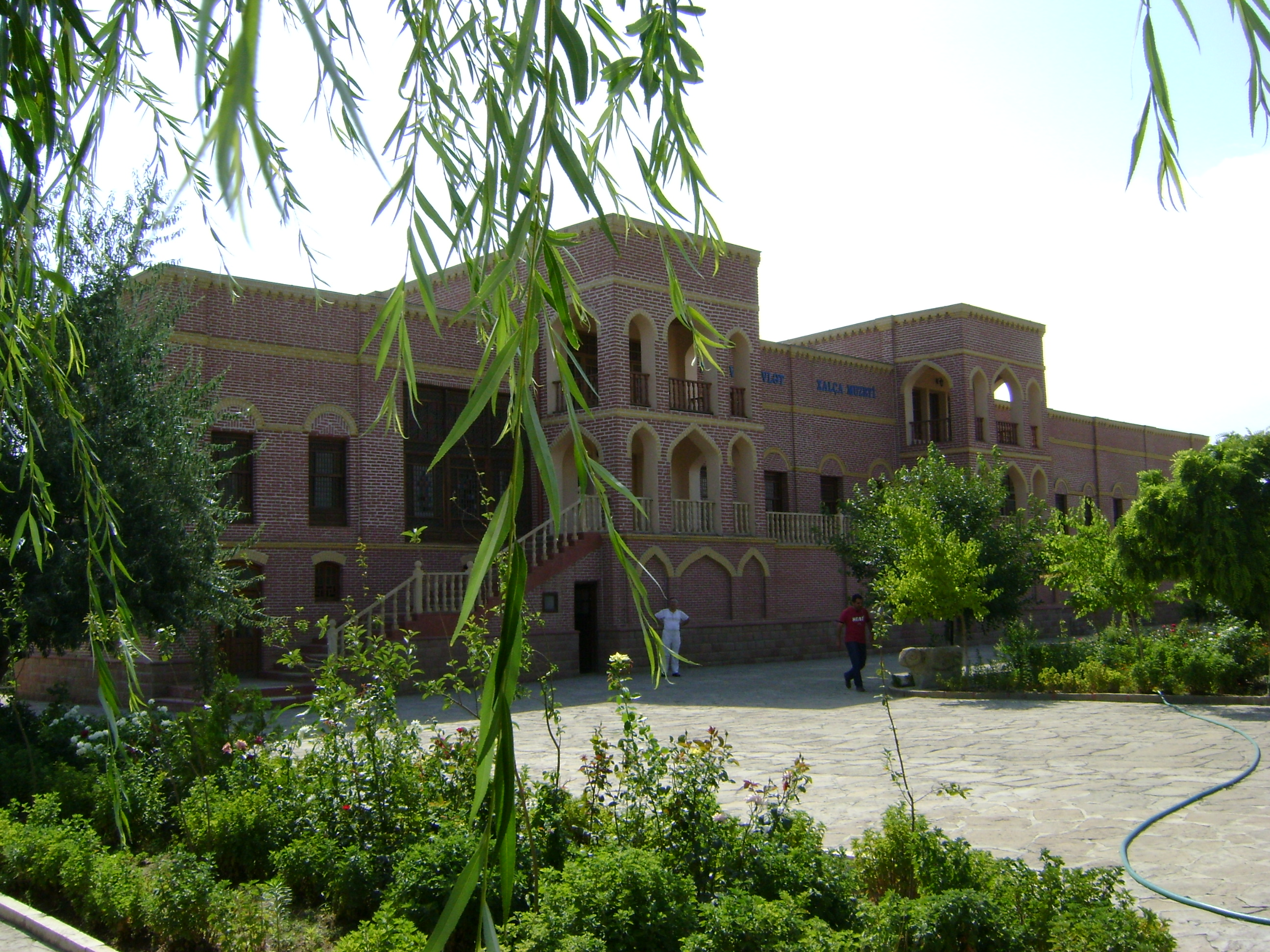
Palace of Nakhchivan Khans

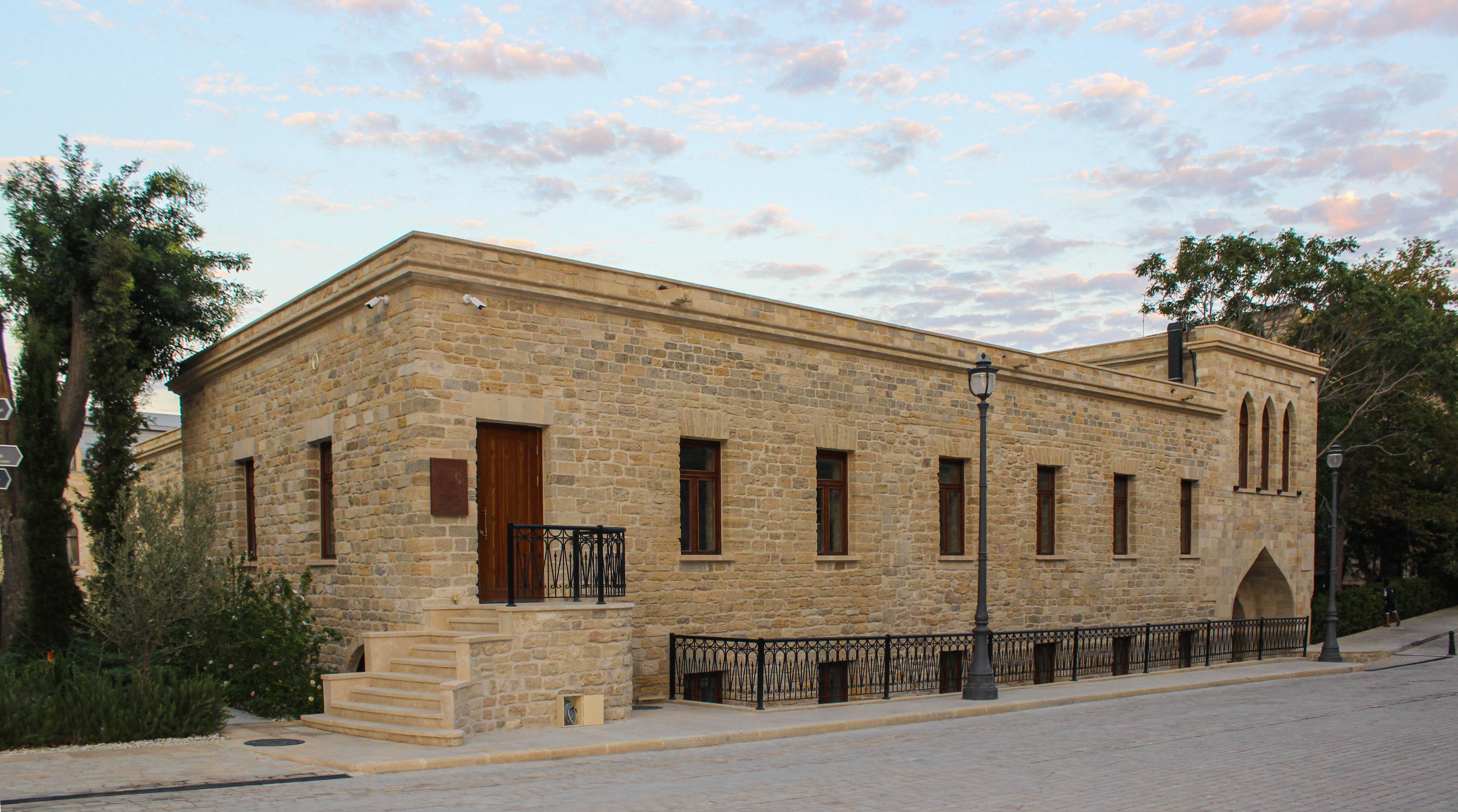
Baku Khans' Palace

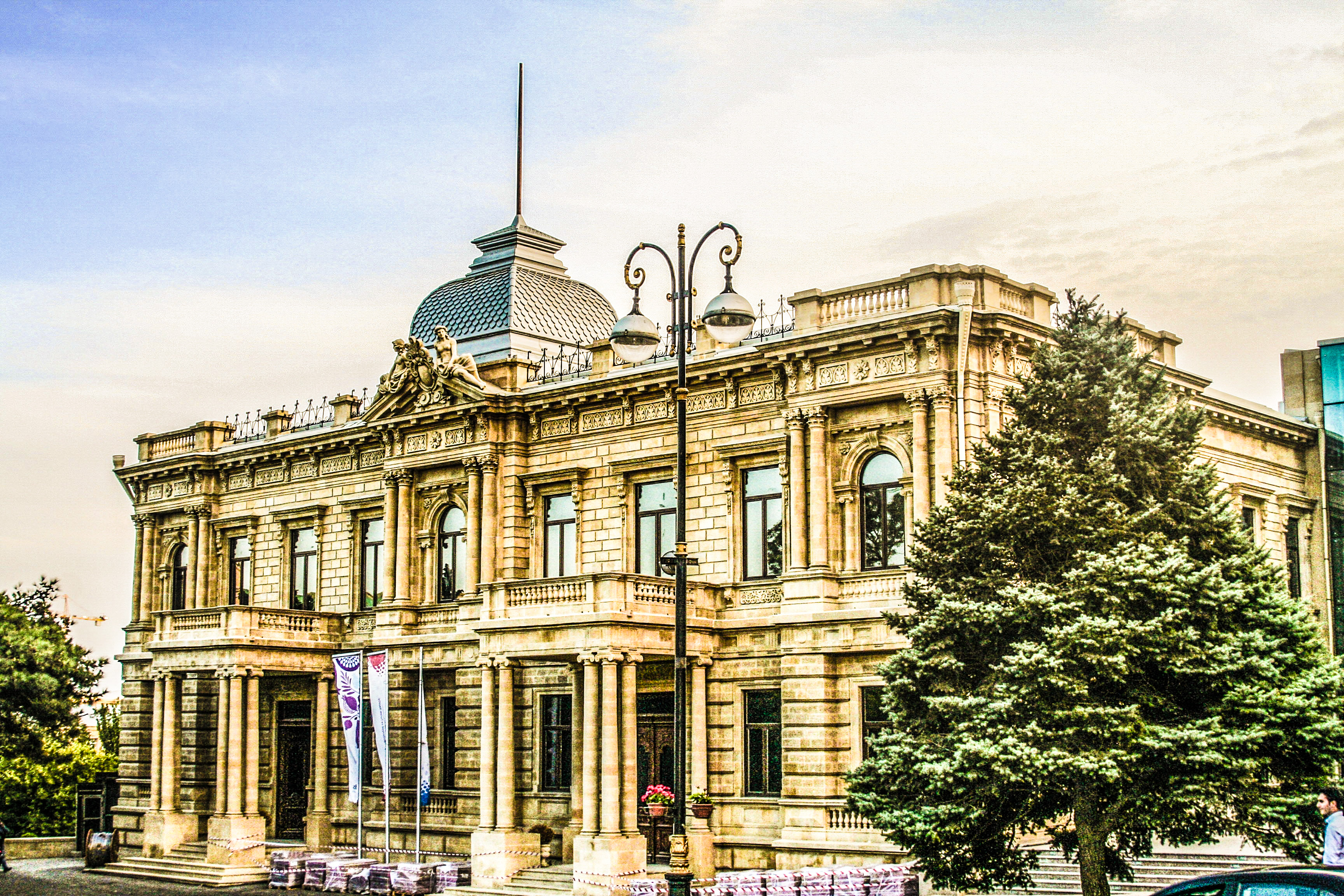
Palace of De Boure

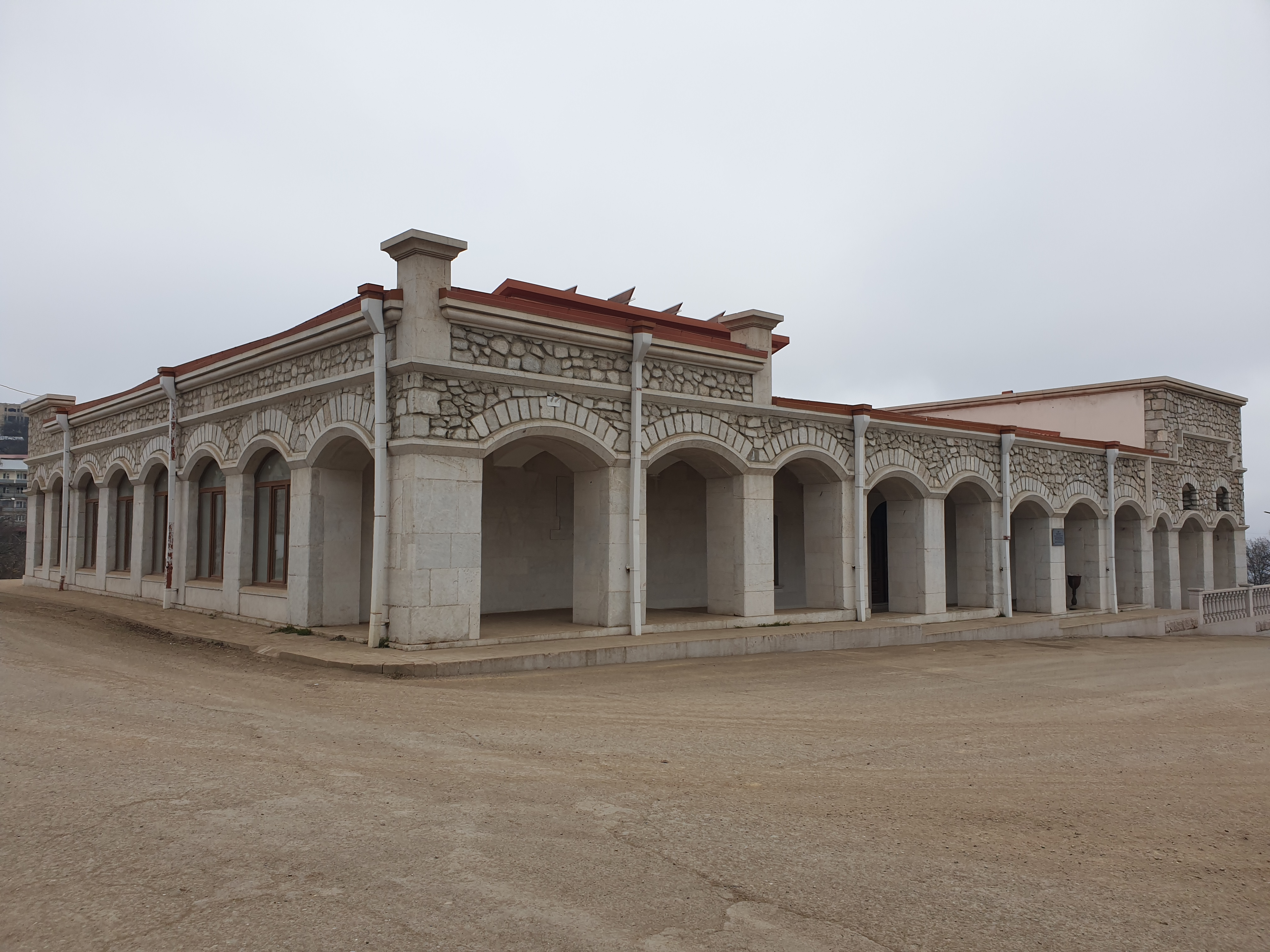
Masjidli Caravanserai

== Skyscrapers and highrises ==
At the end of the 1990s the highrise buildings abundantly appeared in Baku, the capital city of Azerbaijan and have, since then, continued to appear.

Flame Towers

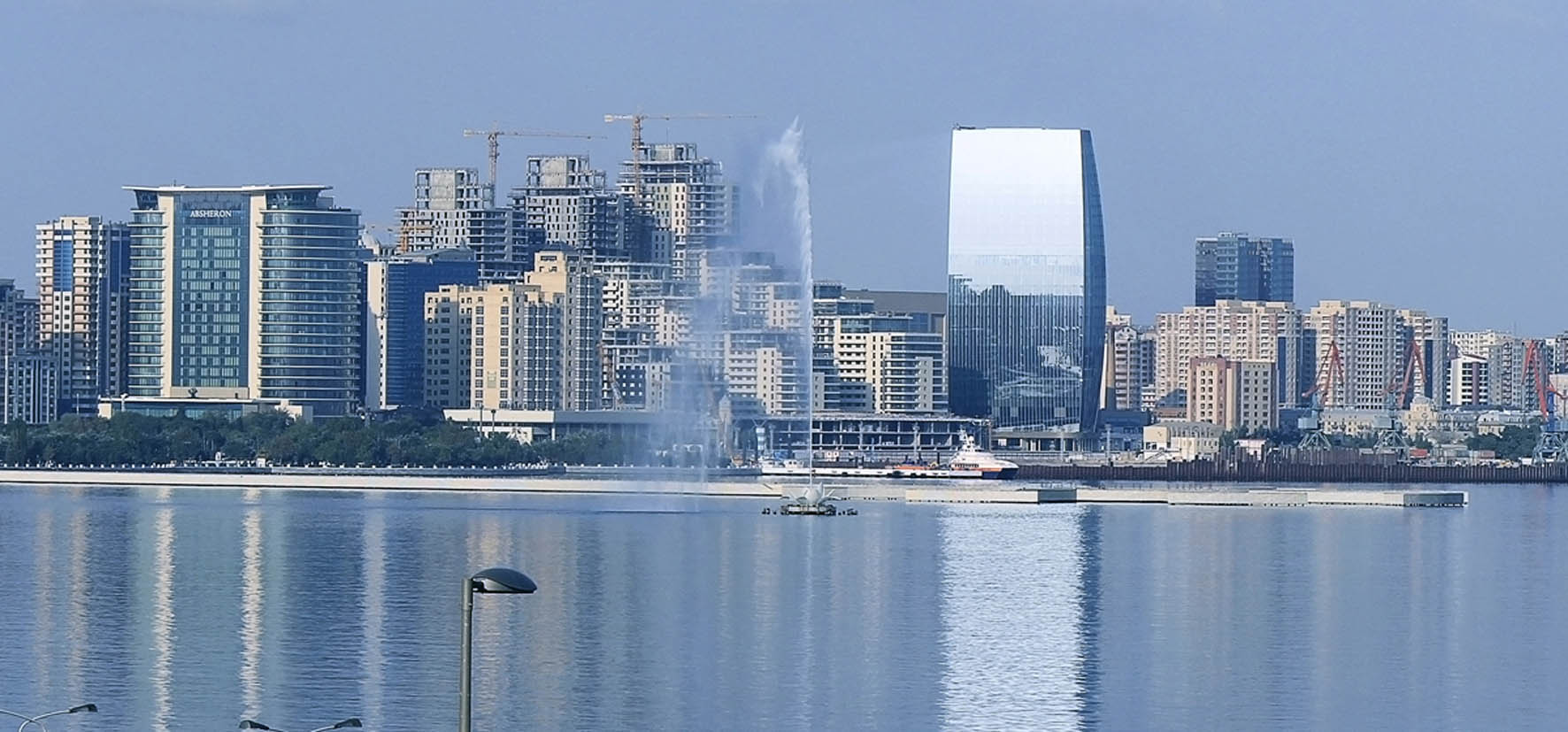
Port Baku Towers

Ritz-Carlton Baku Hotel

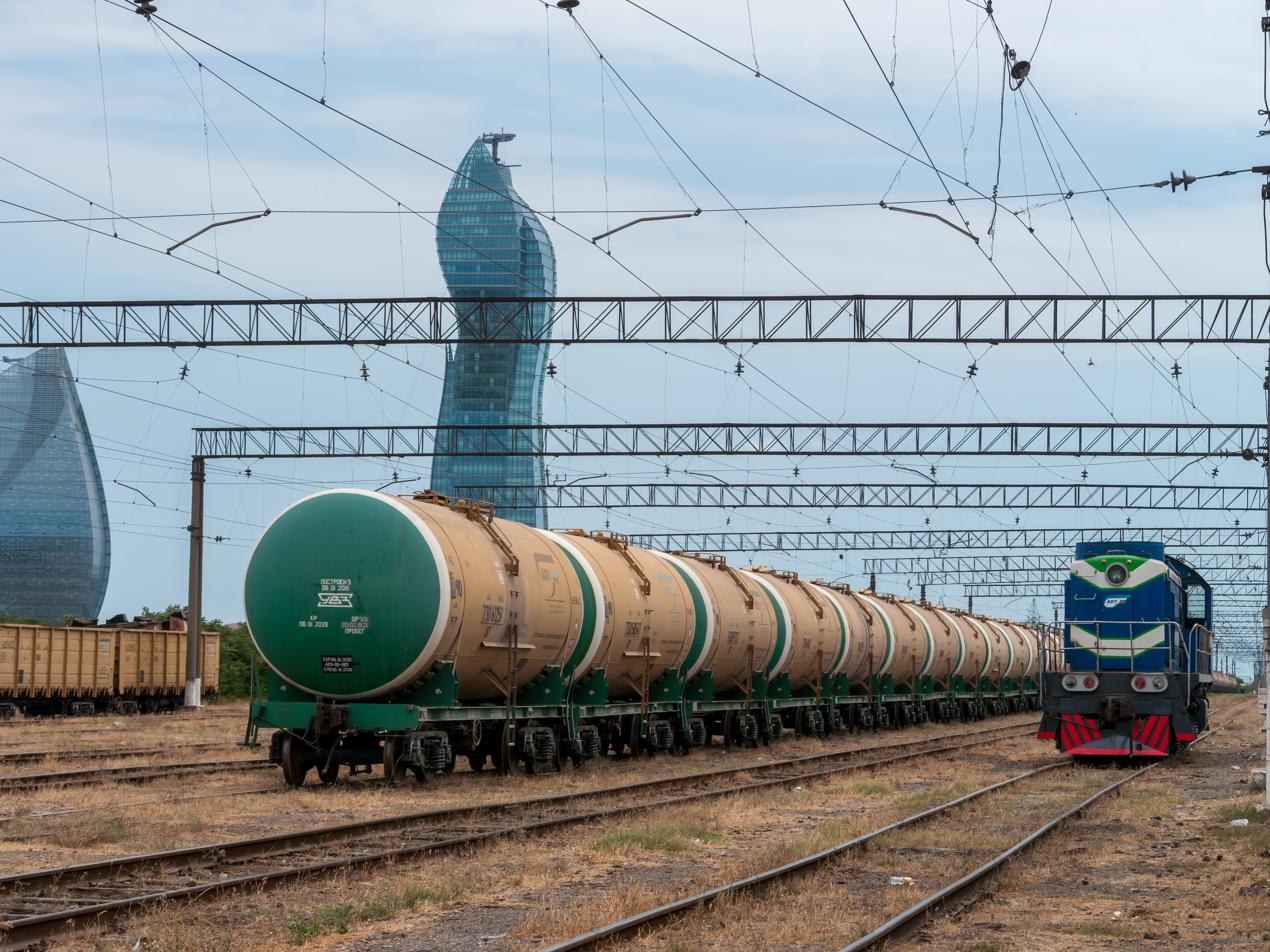
SOCAR Tower

Crescent Development project

== 20th-century architecture of Azerbaijan ==
The initial stage of architectural development in Azerbaijan during the Soviet era is related to the establishment of working settlements around Baku such as Binagadi, Rasulzade, Bakikhanov, Montin, and Mammadyarov.

The general layout of the Greater Baku, one of the first major plans in the former USSR, also included construction of new regions. In addition to measures to solve the housing problem, transport communication has also been improved in the Absheron.

The first graduate program of the Faculty of Construction in Polytechnical Institute of Azerbaijan was in 1929. The young architects S.Dadashov and M.Useynov designed and constructed the Bayil factory (a present-day maternity hospital), the new building of the Azerbaijan Industrial Institute (the present Azerbaijan State Academy of Oil and Industry) (1932), House of Fine Arts Workers, a number of residential buildings, and the Pedagogical Technical School in Gazakh (all in 1933).

In the 1930s, a new stage in Azerbaijani architecture began. The construction of Governmental House of Baku was started in 1934, but the beginning of the Second World War ceased the construction operation. After the War in 1945, the construction of the unfinished building began anew, with completion in 1952.

The Nizami Theatre and the former building of the Ministry of Food Industry of the Republic of Azerbaijan (both during 1937–1939), which were constructed on the bases of Dadashov and Useinov's projects, were different from other buildings due to their volume-space structure and architectural solutions.

At the end of the 1930s, many school buildings were built in the country; in addition, the general layouts of Yevlakh, Khankendi and Sheki cities were started.

The National Library named after M. F. Axundov, was built in 1961 in a synthesis of modern and classical styles. The project of this library was provided by Mikhail Huseynov, known as the largest library building in the Caucasus.

Yusif ibn Kuseyr and Momina Khatun mausoleums created by Ajami Nakhchivani, whose 850th anniversary was celebrated in 1976, were rescued from destruction and reconstructed.

The Presidential Palace was built on the basis of a project built under design Fuad Orujov (project manager), Tahir Allahverdiyev (architect) and Madat Khalafov (designer) between 1977 and 1986. The palace is a twelve-storey building with façades of marble and granite.

Different decisions and events, related to problems of protection of historically Azerbaijani towns and all town-building systems, have been carried out. Shaki (1968), Icharishahar in Baku, Shusha and Ordubad (all in 1977), Lahidj settlement (1980), Nardaran village (1992), Shabran town, Davachi region (2002), Ilisu village, Qakh region (2002), Arpachay bank, Ordubad region (2002), Chiraggala tower, Davachi region (2002), Kish village, Shaki region (2003), Pir Huseyn khanagah (abode), and Hadjigabul region (2004) were announced as historical reserves of the architecture of Azerbaijan.

== 21st-century architecture of Azerbaijan ==
=== Flame Towers ===
Azerbaijan has long been called The Land of Fire. For this reason, many flame figures are being used in this country. The Flame Towers architecture is the most prominent representative of flame figures in Azerbaijan. The flame-shaped structure is equipped with LED screens. It is the tallest building in the country with height of 182 m. The total area of the building is 235,000 square meters. The Flame Towers consist of three buildings, including hotel, apartments, and offices. The building's construction began in 2007, with completion in 2012. In 2013, it was awarded the "best hotel and tourist center" grant by MIPIM.

Heydar Aliyev Center

=== Haydar Aliyev Culture Center ===
One of the most important and visible example of new architecture in Azerbaijan is Haydar Aliyev Center. The Haydar Aliyev Cultural Center includes the history of rise of the Caspian Sea in the Azerbaijani mythology. Iraqi-British architect Zaha Hadid was appointed as an architectural designer of the Haydar Aliyev Center in 2007. The center is considered to be one of the symbols of modern Baku. The area of the complex is 15.93 hectares. The straight line has not been used in the project. The lines of the building symbolize the merging of the past with the future. Center aims breaking from the monumental Soviet architecture which is quite common in Baku and to express the sensibilities of Azeri culture and the optimism of a nation that looks to the future.

Baku Crystal Hall

=== Baku Crystal Hall ===
The Baku Crystal Hall is sport-entertainment complex, which was built to host the Eurovision 2012 in Baku. On August 2, 2011, it was announced that main agreement was signed with the German construction company named ‘’Alpine Bau Deutschland AG’’ and necessary preparation had begun. Arena construction was completed on 16 April 2012. The capacity of this hall is 25,000 spectators and VIP rooms in the arena. The magnificent lighting system used in the Baku Crystal Hall consists of over 2,500 projectors and more than 3,000 meters of cable which were brought from Germany. Light-emitting diodes with an area of more than 1,300 m are placed in the form of electronic windows on the scene of the Baku Crystal Hall.

Baku Olympic Stadium

=== Baku Olympic Stadium ===
The construction of the stadium has started on June 6, 2011 with the participation of President Ilham Aliyev, former FIFA and UEFA presidents – Sepp Blatter and Michel Platini respectively. The opening ceremony of Baku Olympic Stadium was held on March 6, 2015 and stadium is considered to hold major sport events in Azerbaijan. This multifunctional stadium is the largest stadium in Azerbaijan with total capacity of 68,700 seats for spectators. The Baku Olympic Stadium is chosen to be the 7th best stadium in the world by StadiumDB. The construction of the stadium was given to TEKFEN which is the Turkish company with Design &Build contracts. Several hotels, parking spaces (total 3,617 car places) and green space (81,574 square meters) has been created in the area around the stadium. Baku Olympic Stadium is consisting of VVIP, VIP – CIP Suites total 127 each with 720 spectator's capacity, 1,800 Seating Capacity Warm Up Area, MEP Building, Info Centre and Two External Buildings.

National Gymnastic Arena

=== National Gymnastics Arena ===
The National Gymnastics Arena, designed for 9,000 people, is located close to the Koroghlu metro station on the Heydar Aliyev highway. The number of seats can be altered from 5,000 to 9,000 seats depending on the capacity and nature of the competition. The Arena has 2 stages, VIP category for serving sponsors on each floor, resting rooms, and a dining room.

== Gallery ==
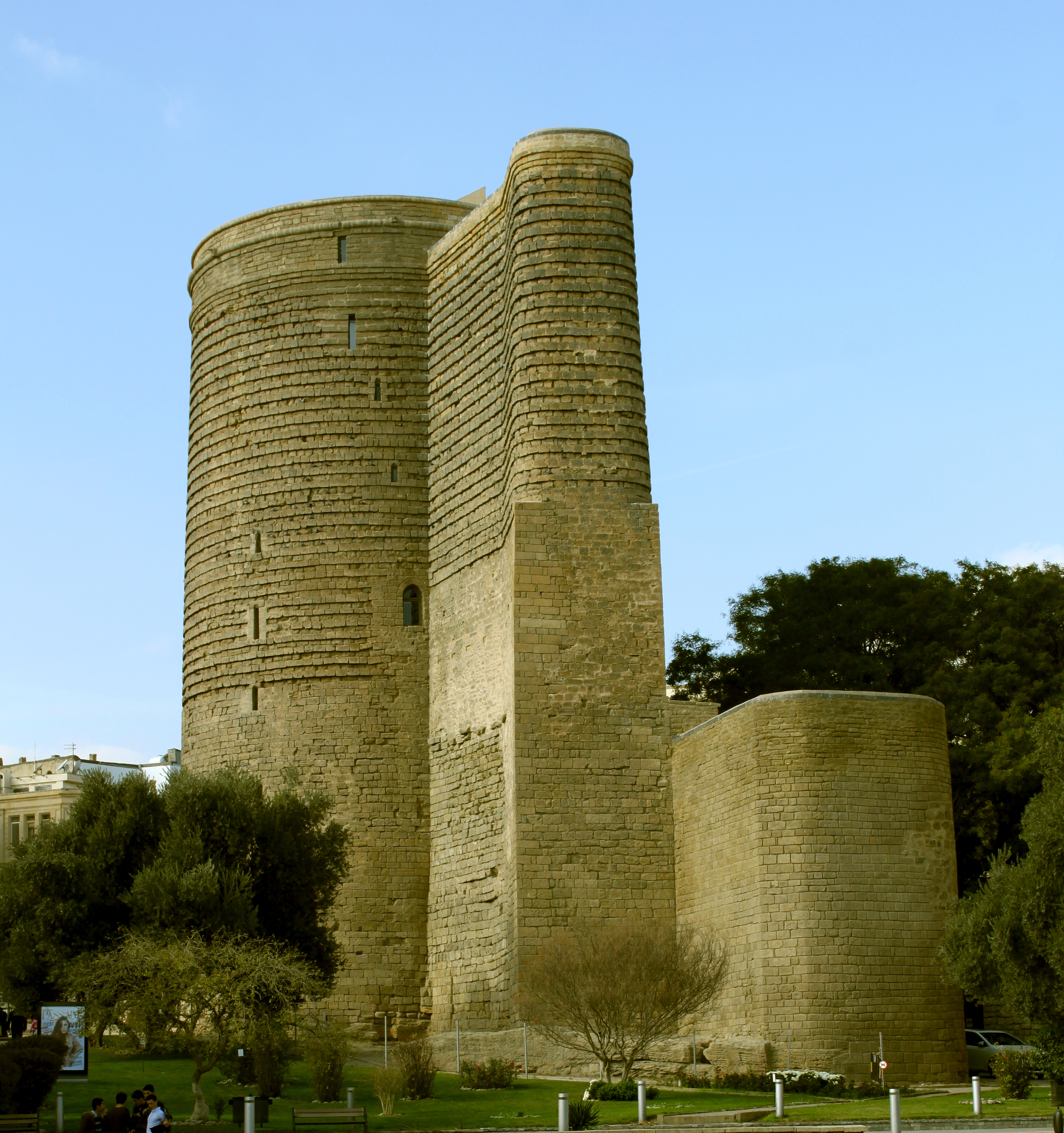
Maiden Tower in Baku

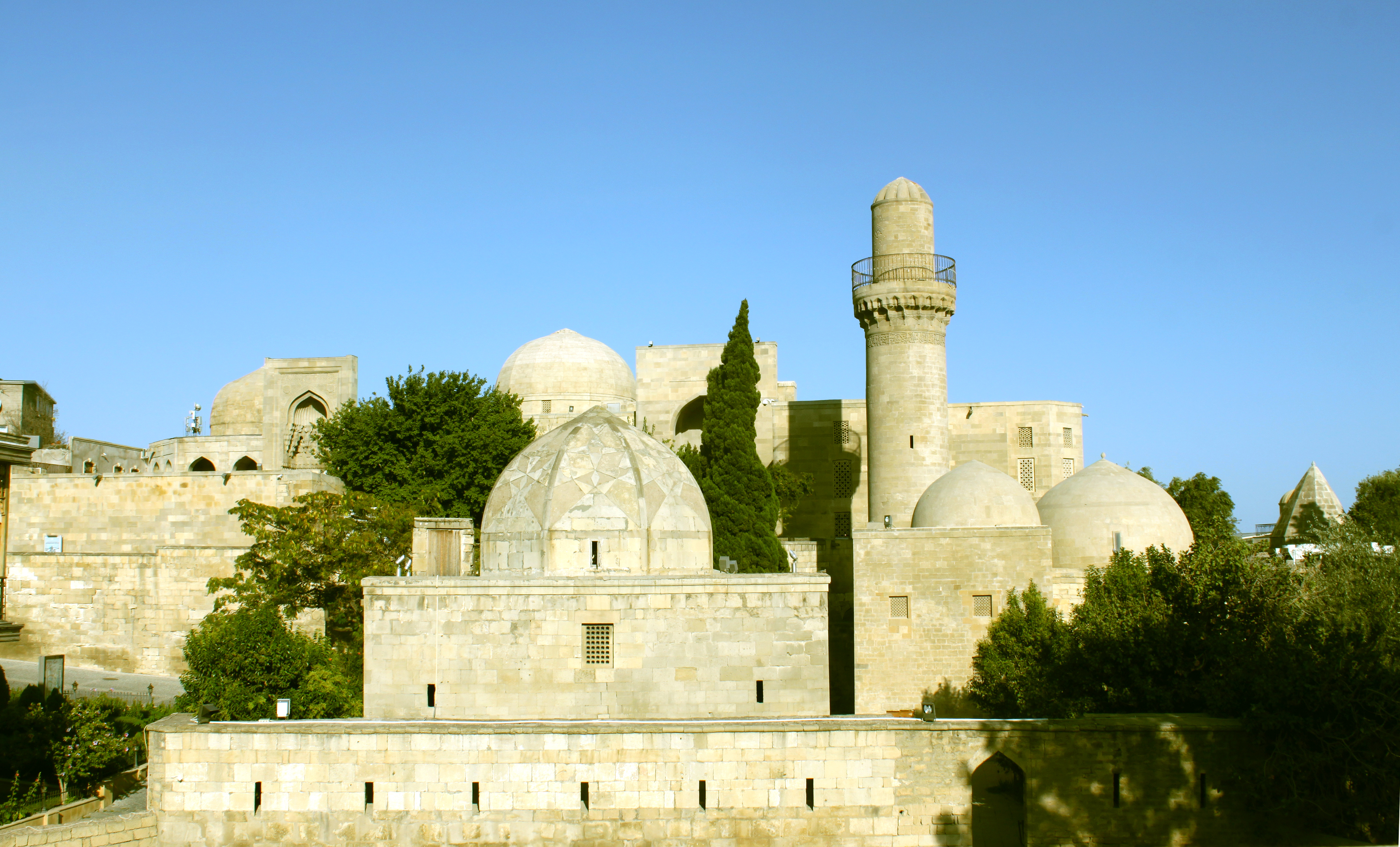
The Palace of the Shirvanshahs

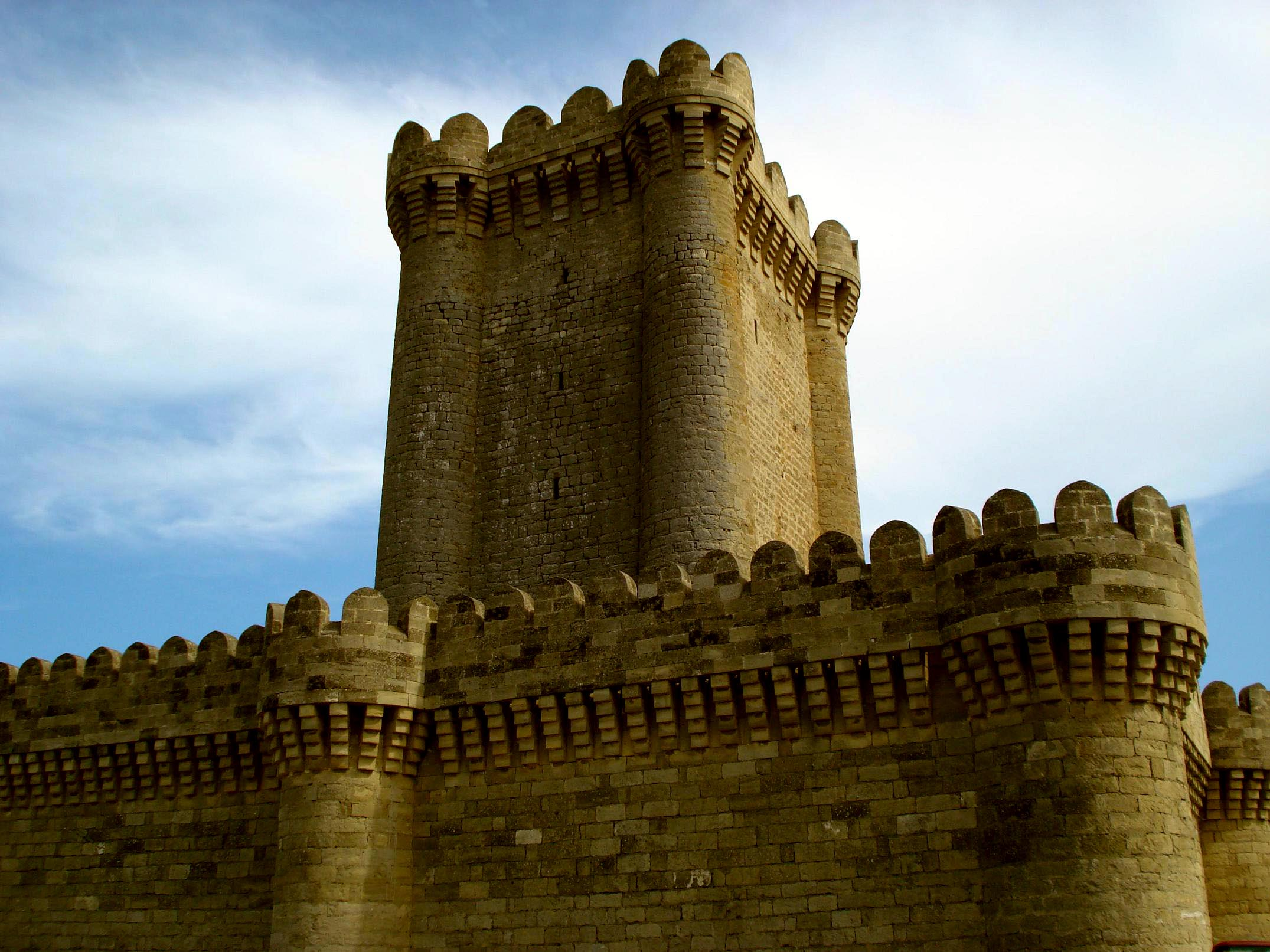
Quadrangular castle of Mardakan

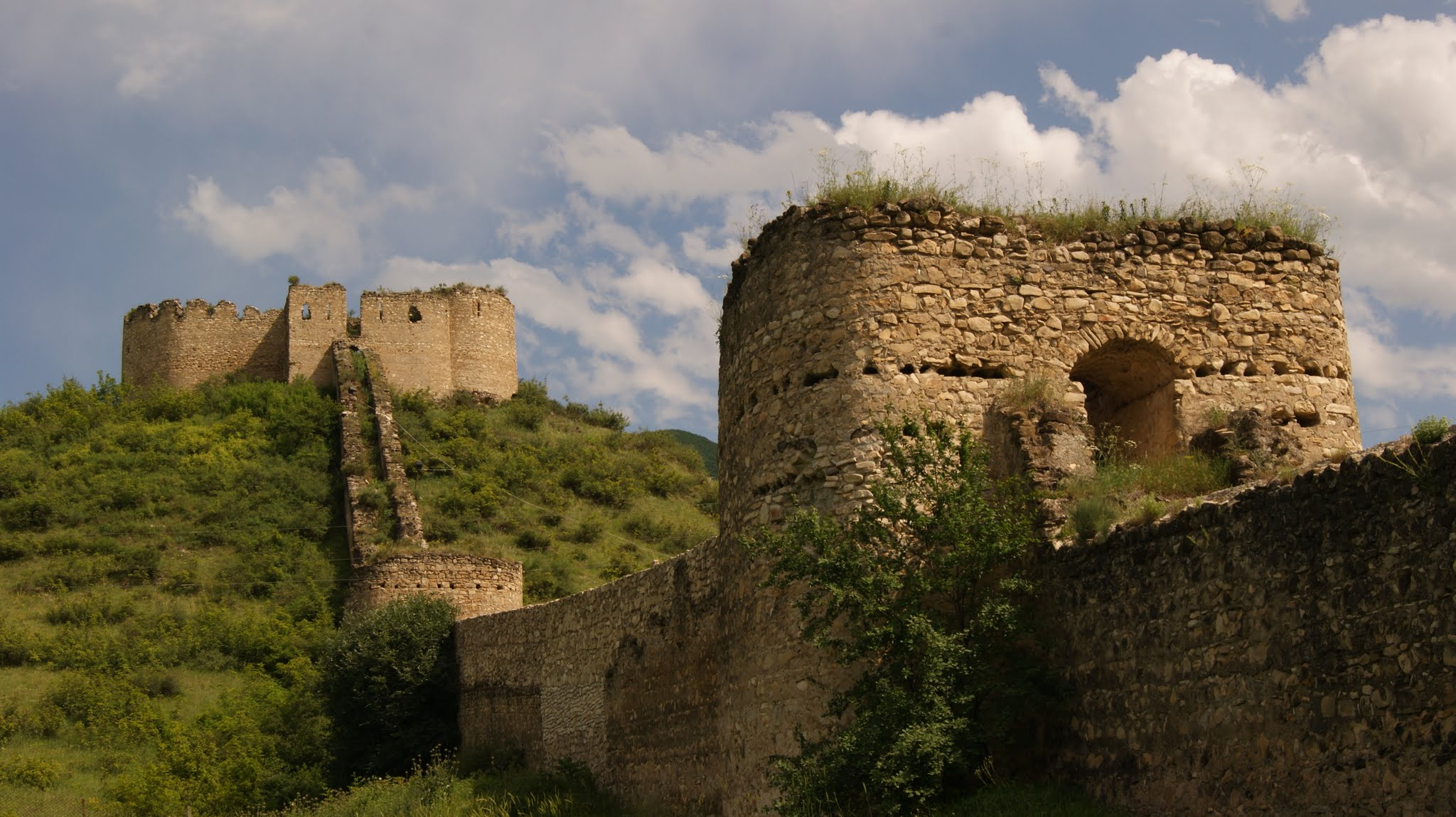
Askeran Fortress

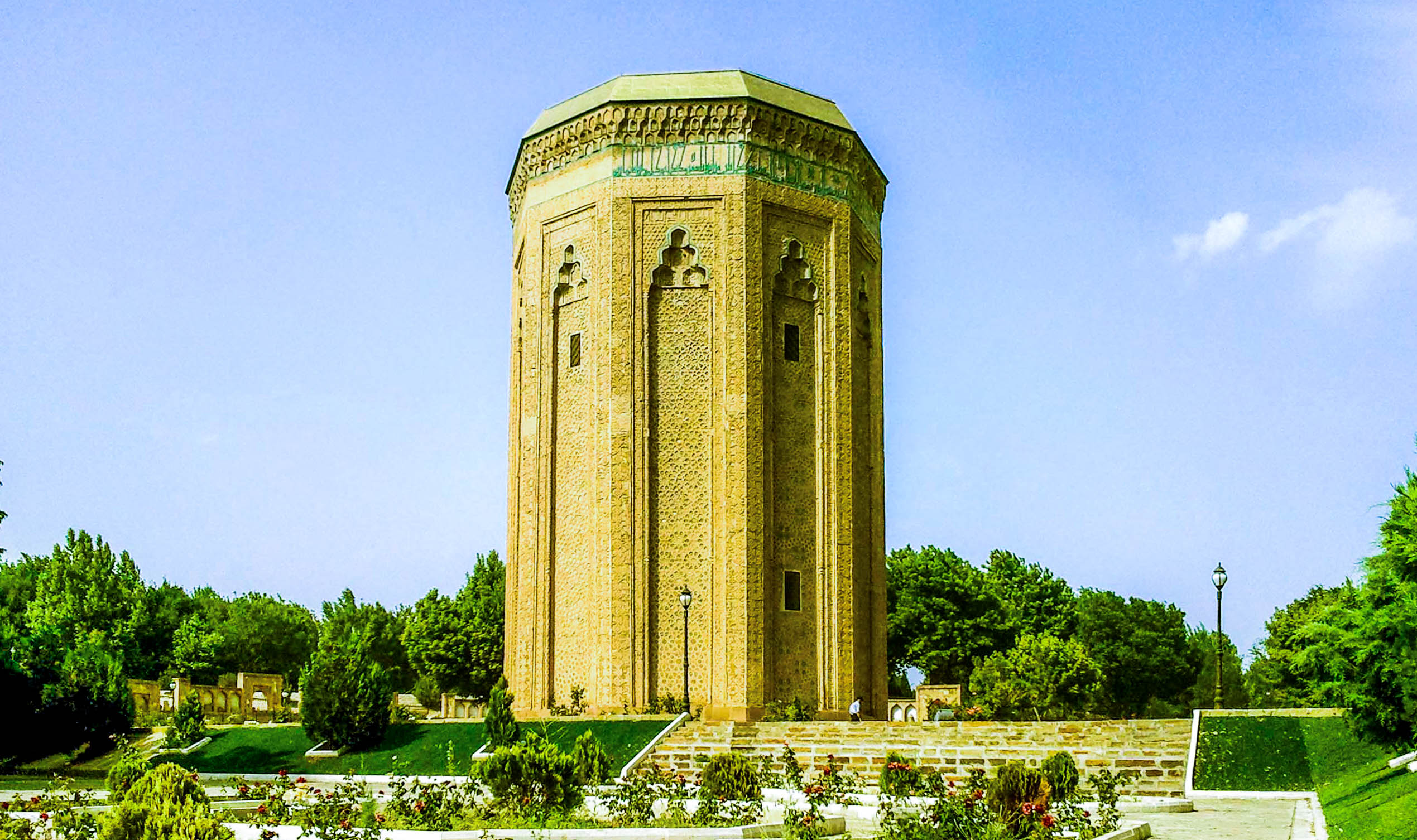
Momine Khatun Mausoleum

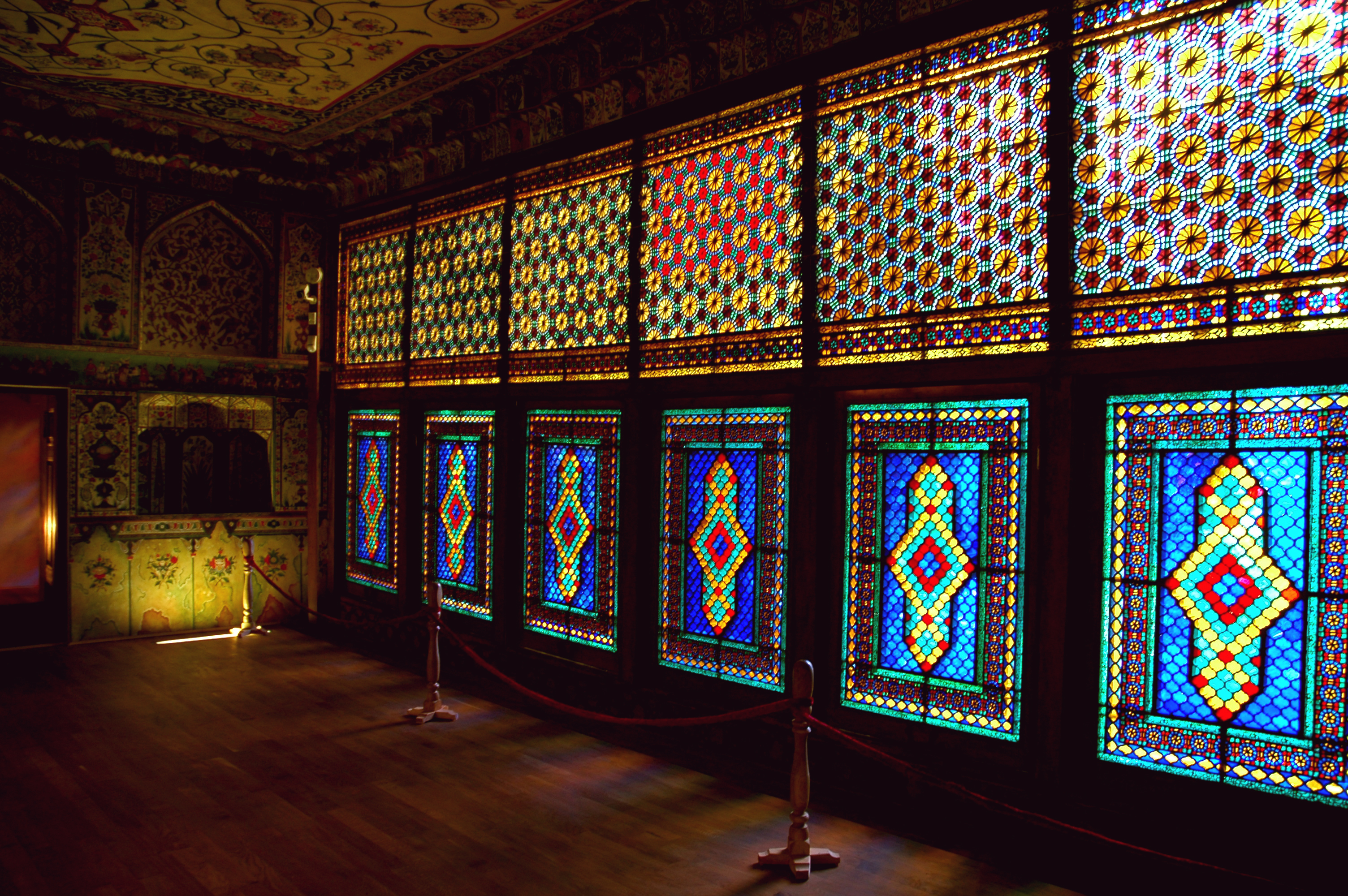
Palace of Shaki Khans

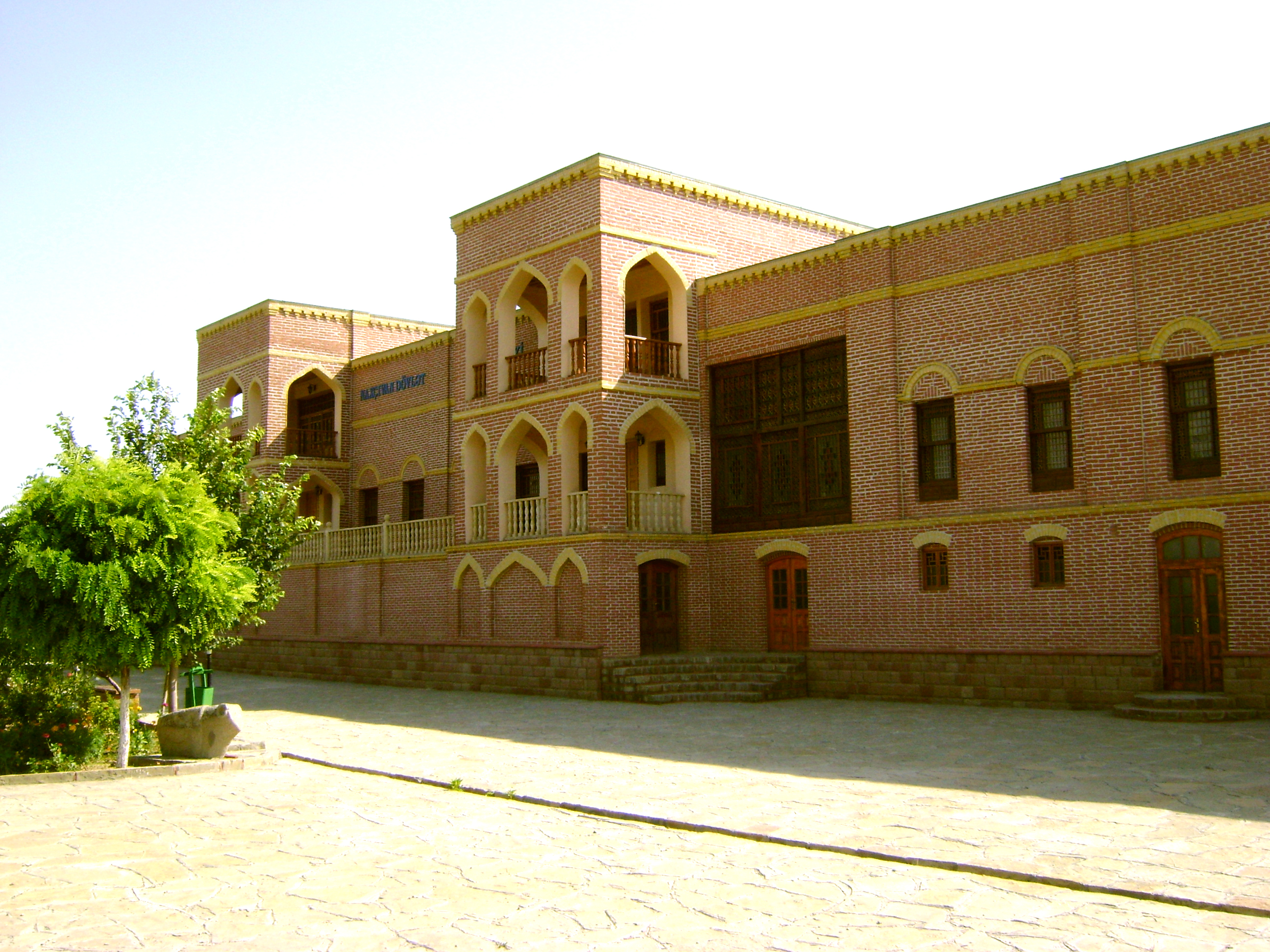
Palace of Nakhchivan Khans

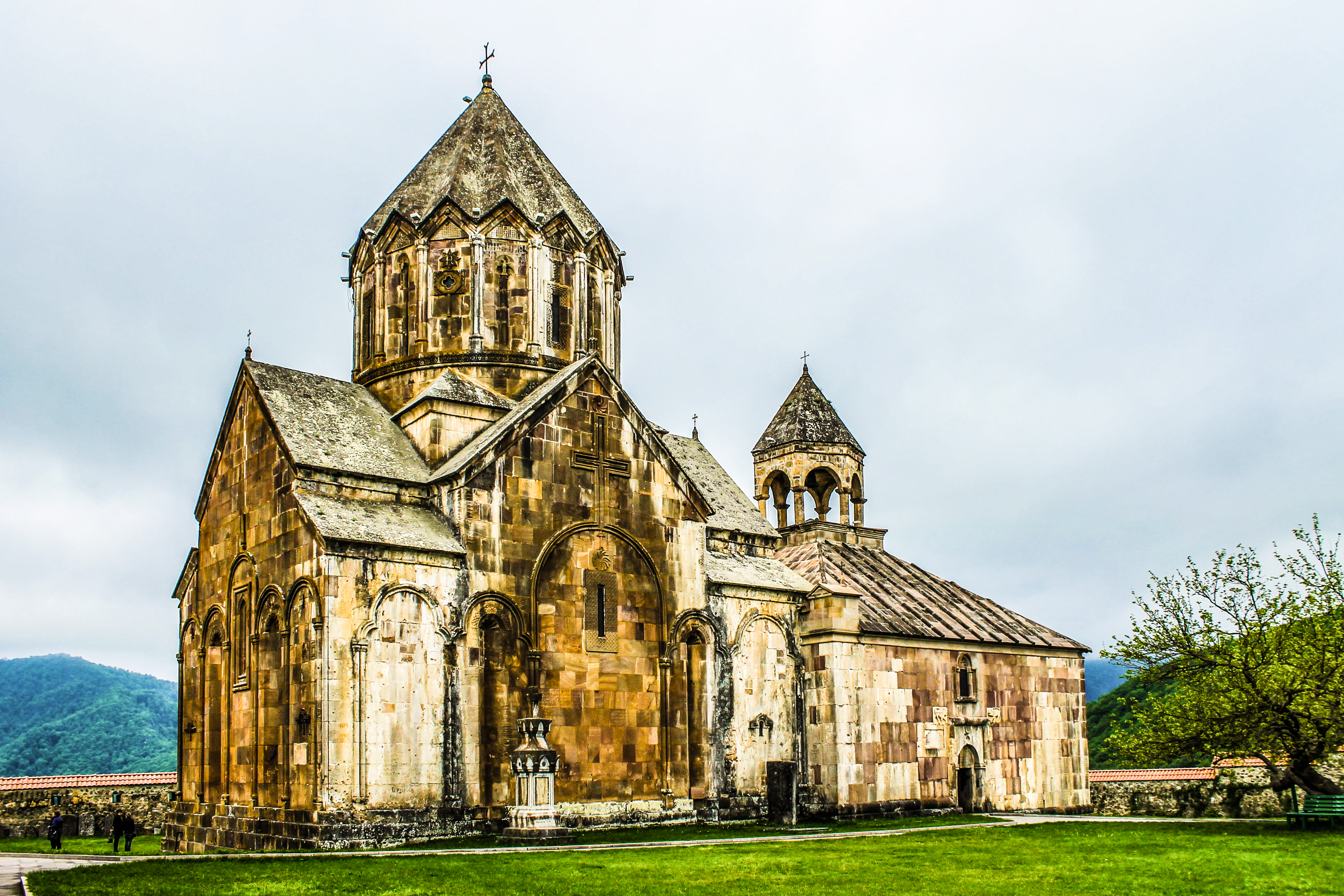
Gandzasar monastery in Kalbajar

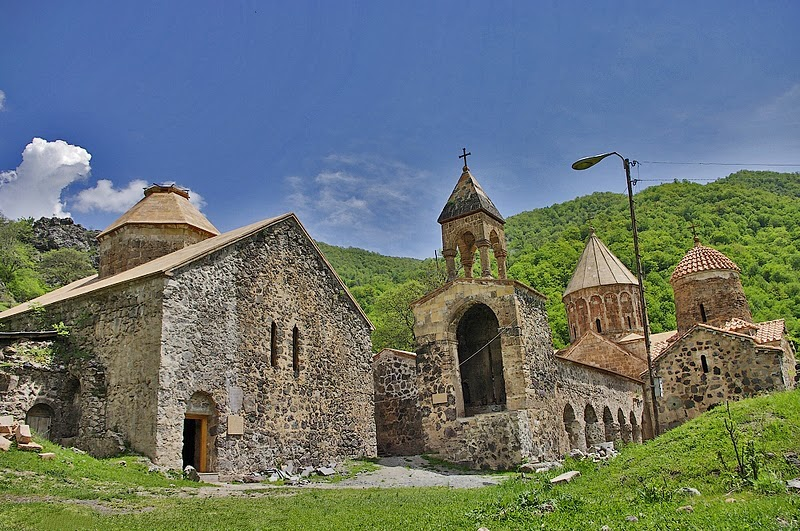
Dadivank monastery

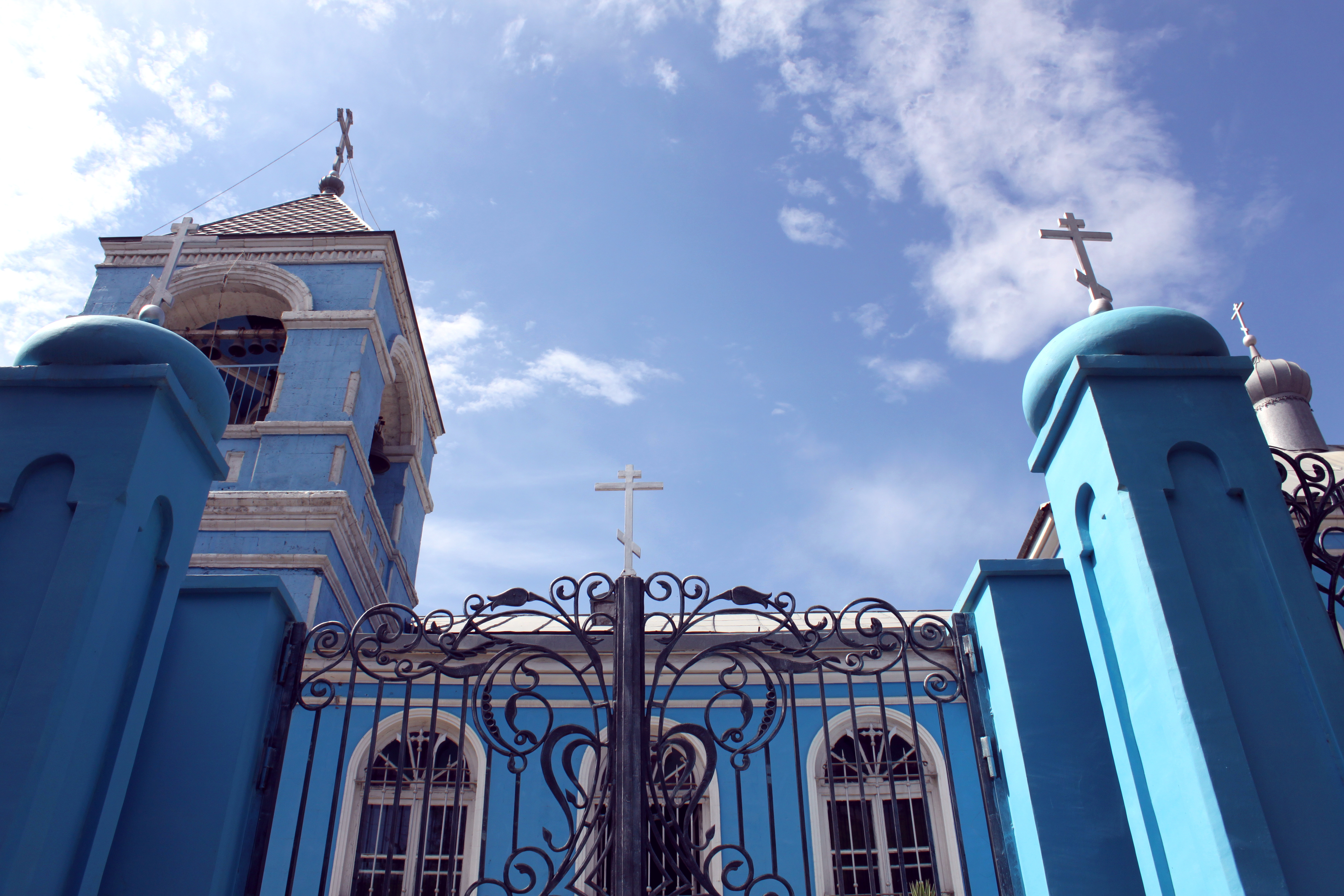
Orthodox Church of Saint Michael Archangel in Baku

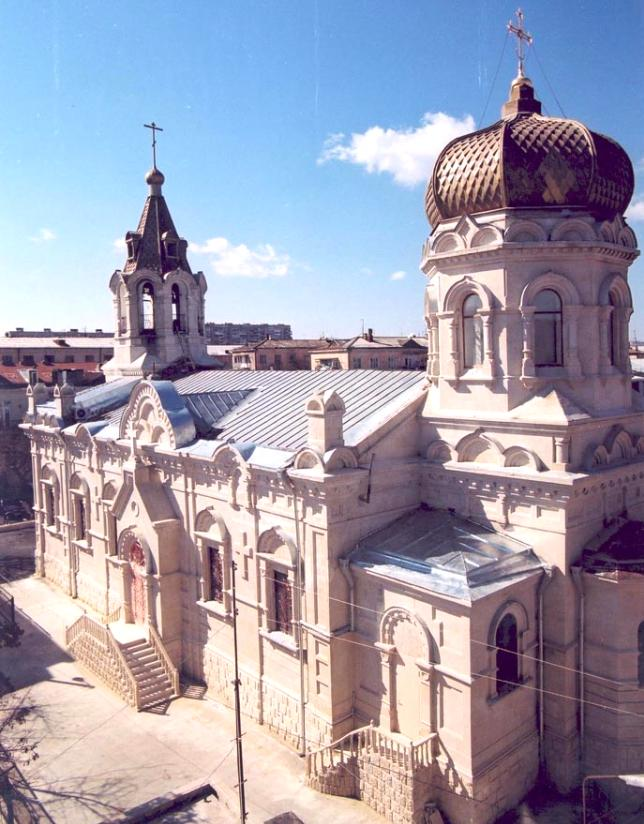
Orthodox Holy Myrrhbearers Cathedral

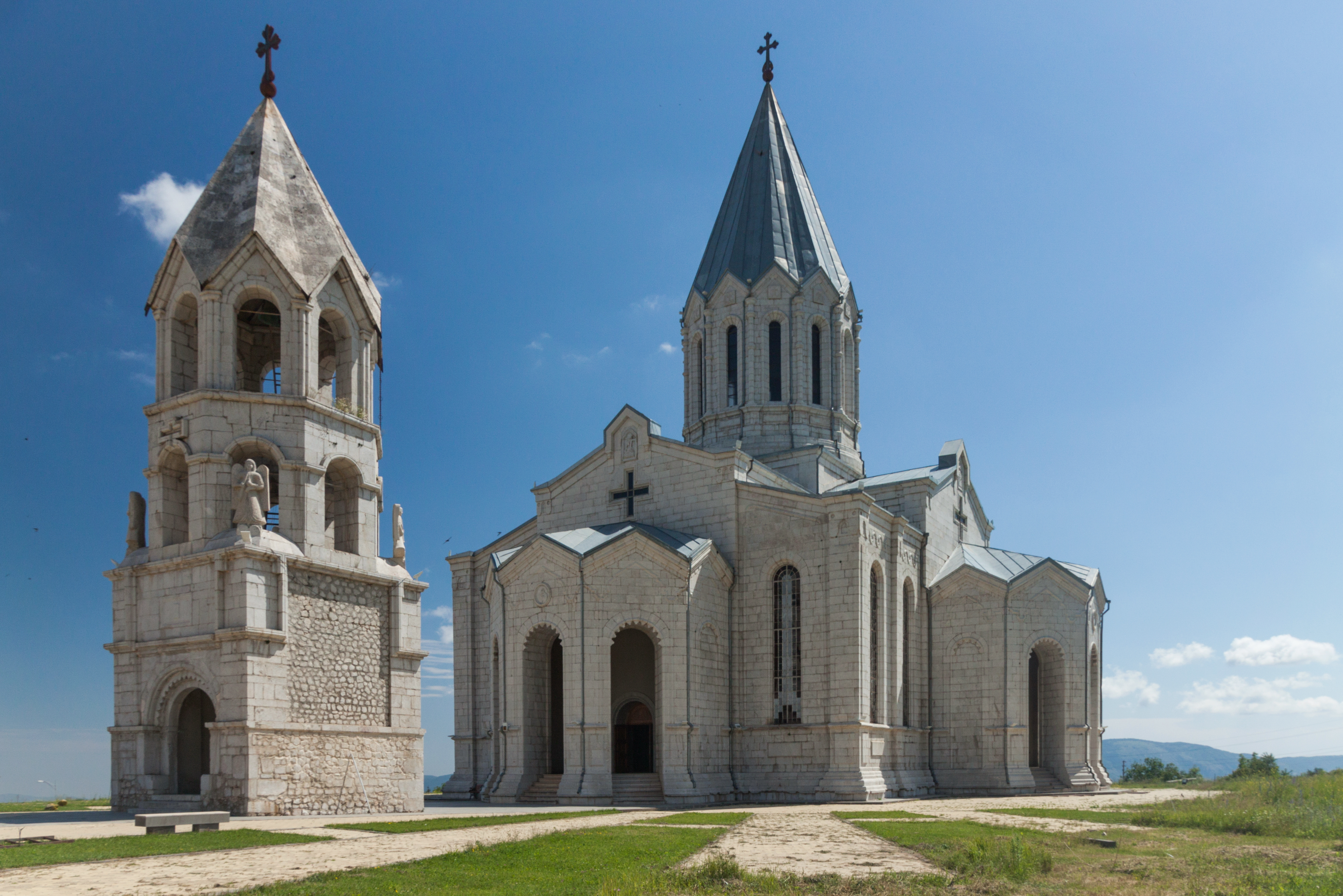
Ghazanchetsots Cathedral in Shusha

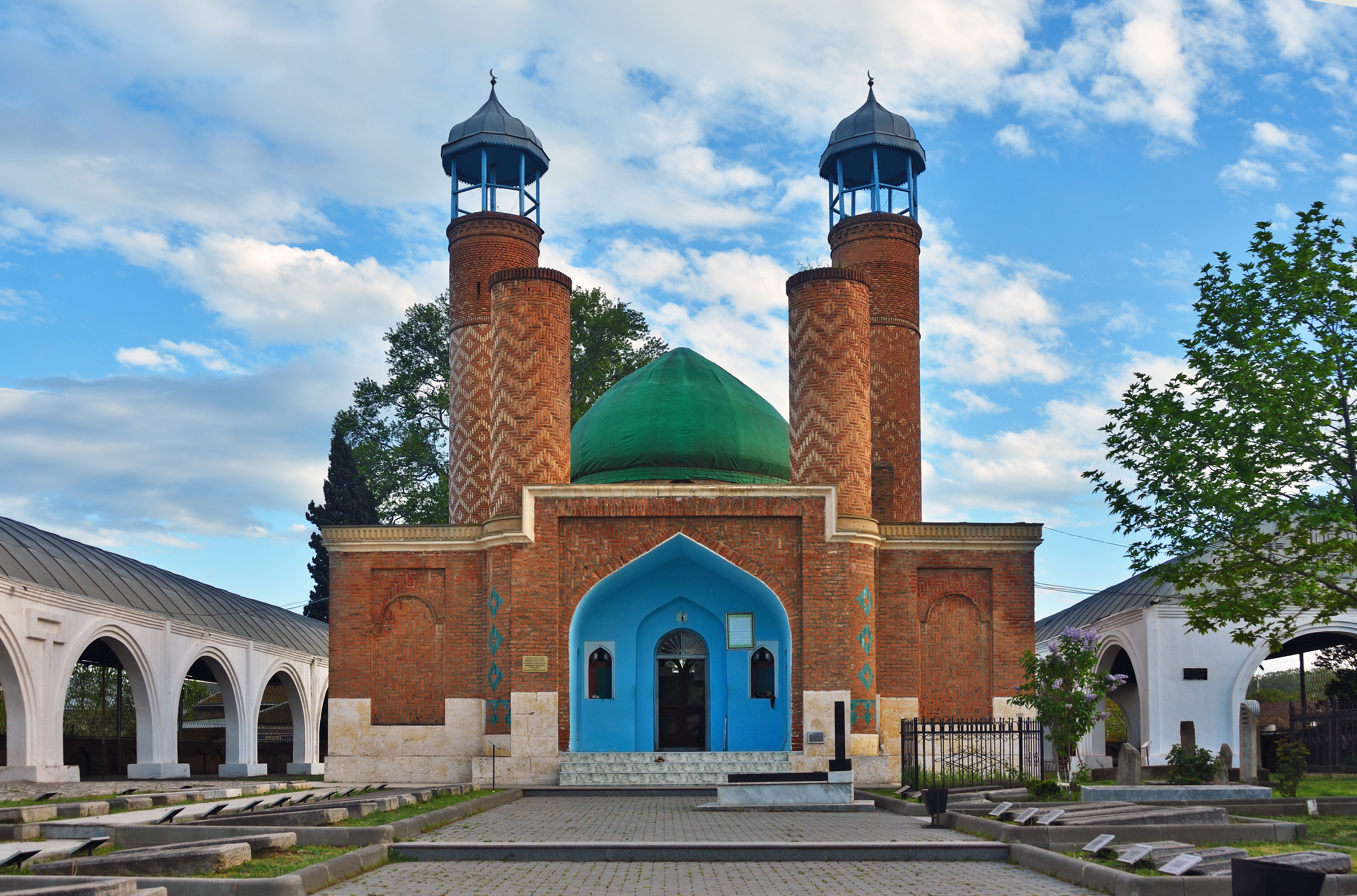
Imamzadeh Mausoleum (Barda)

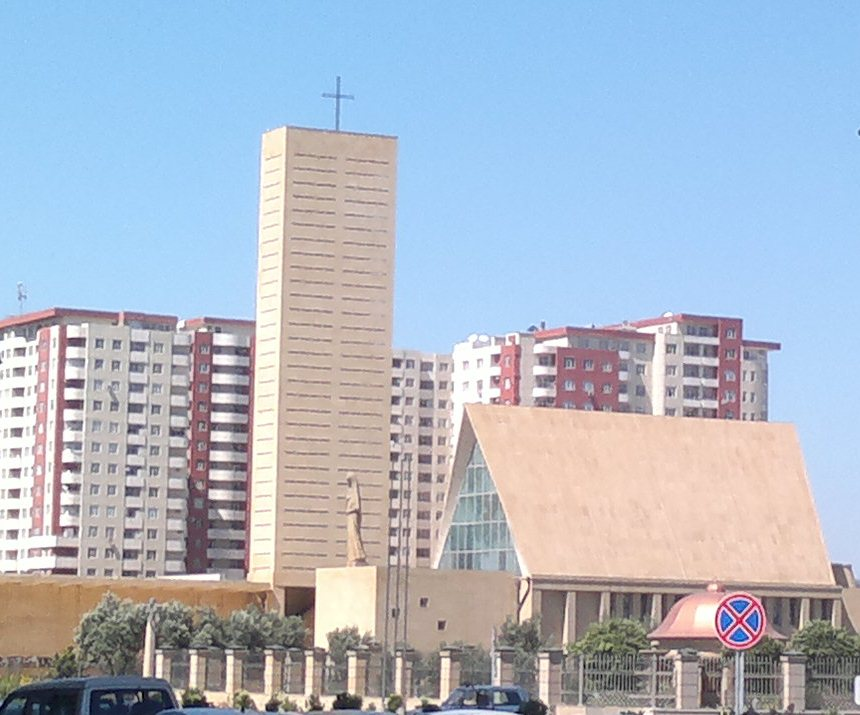
Church of the Immaculate Conception, Baku

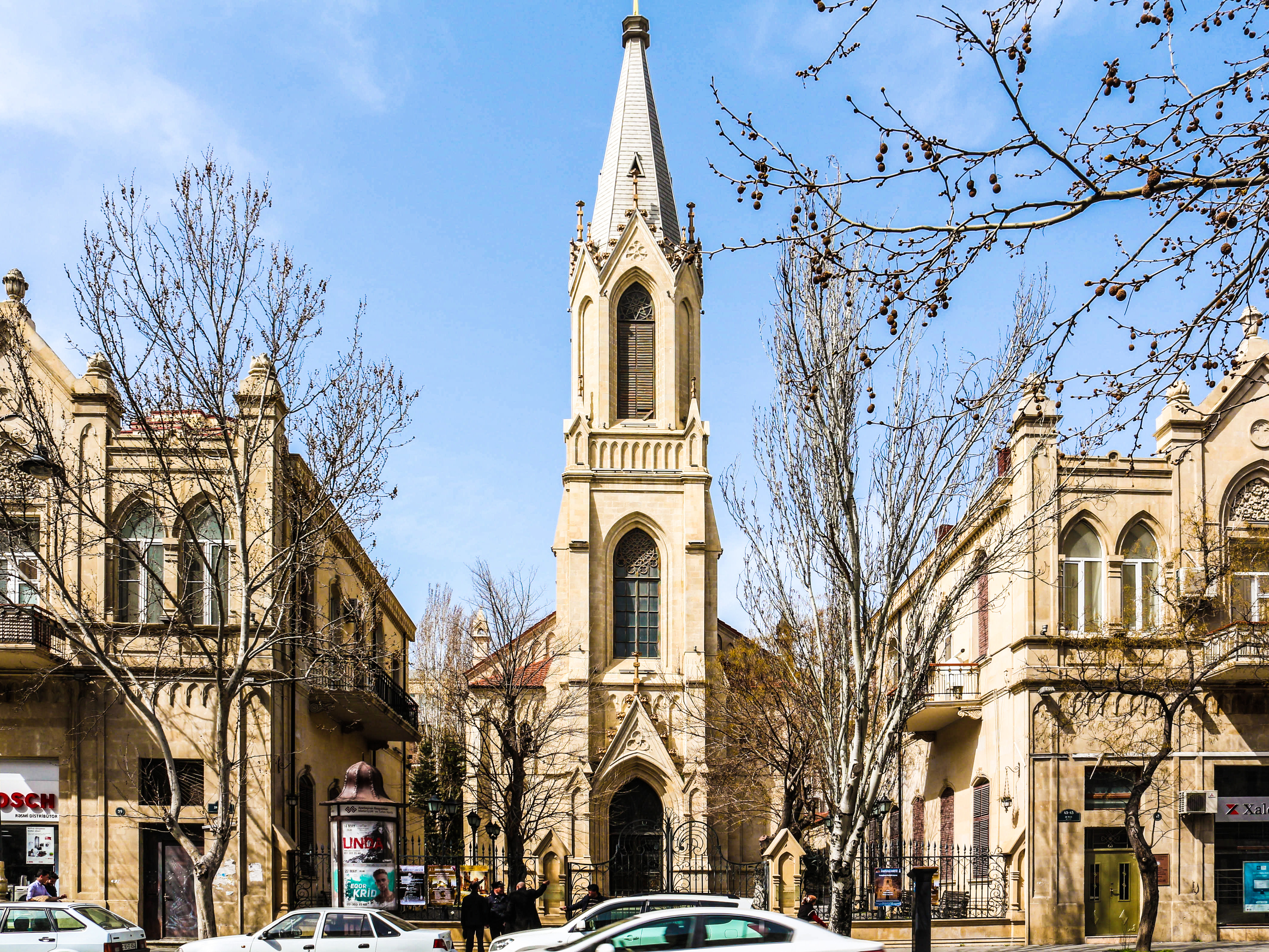
Lutheran Church of the Saviour, Baku

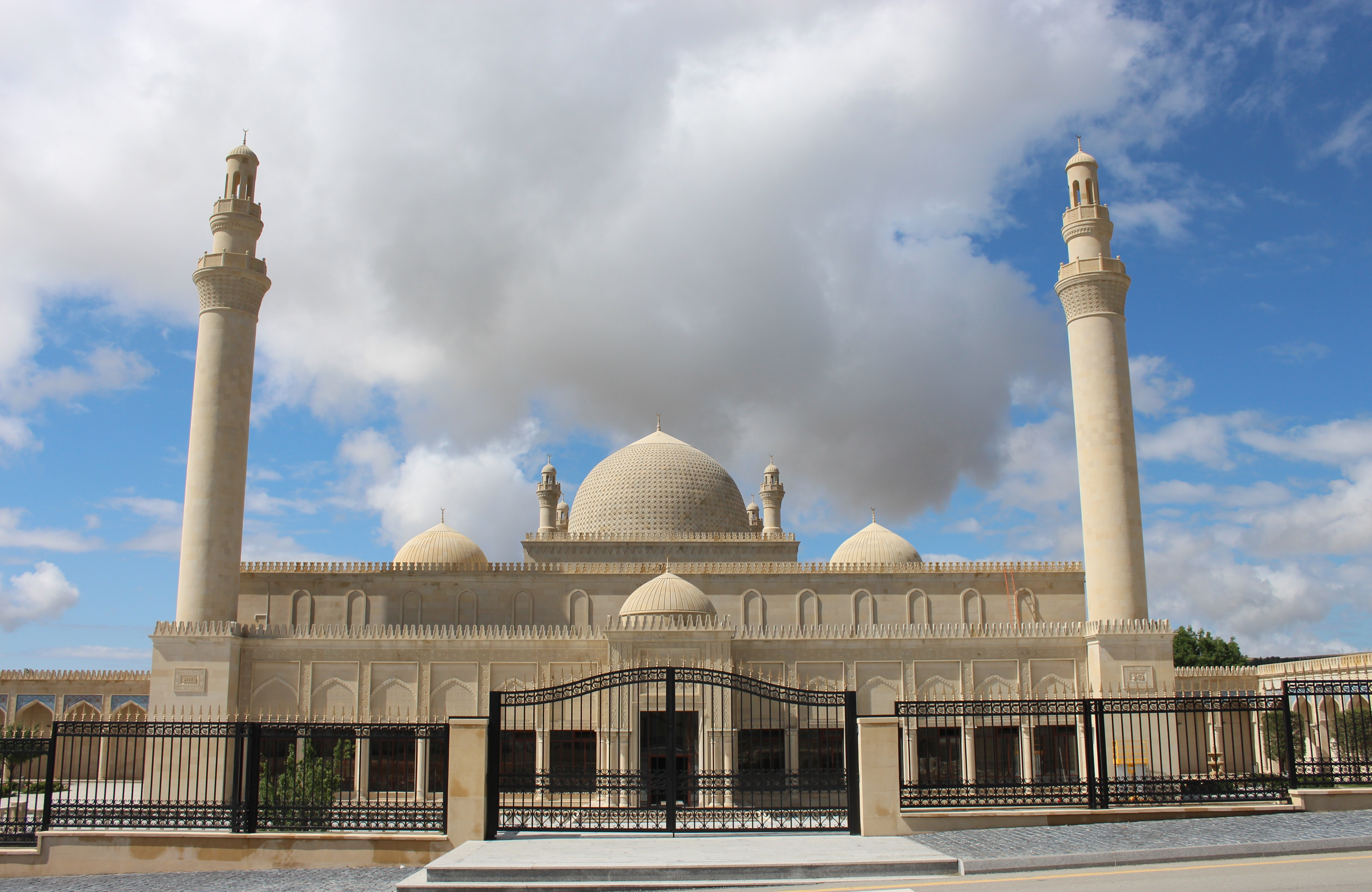
Juma Mosque, Shamakhi

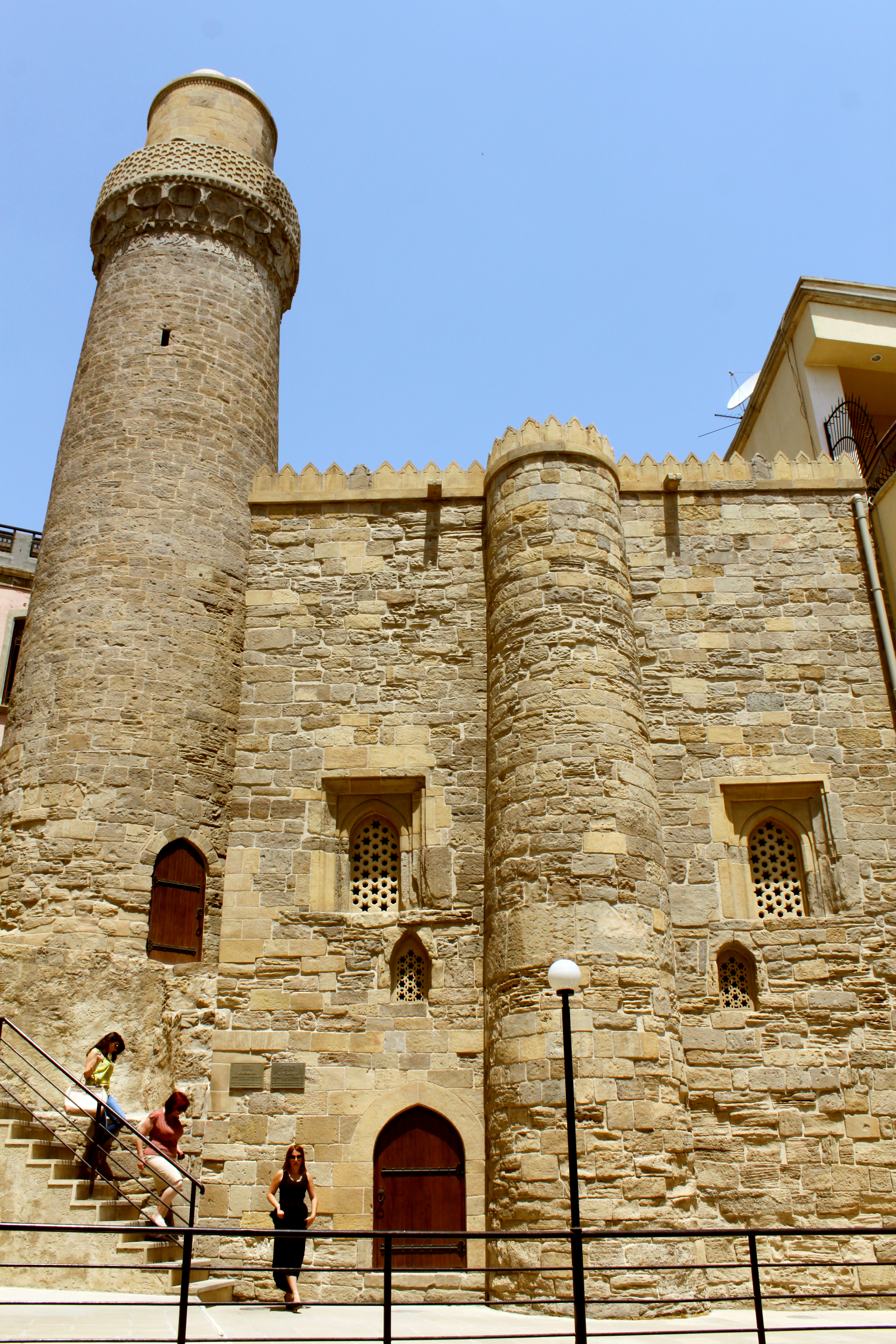
Muhammad Mosque

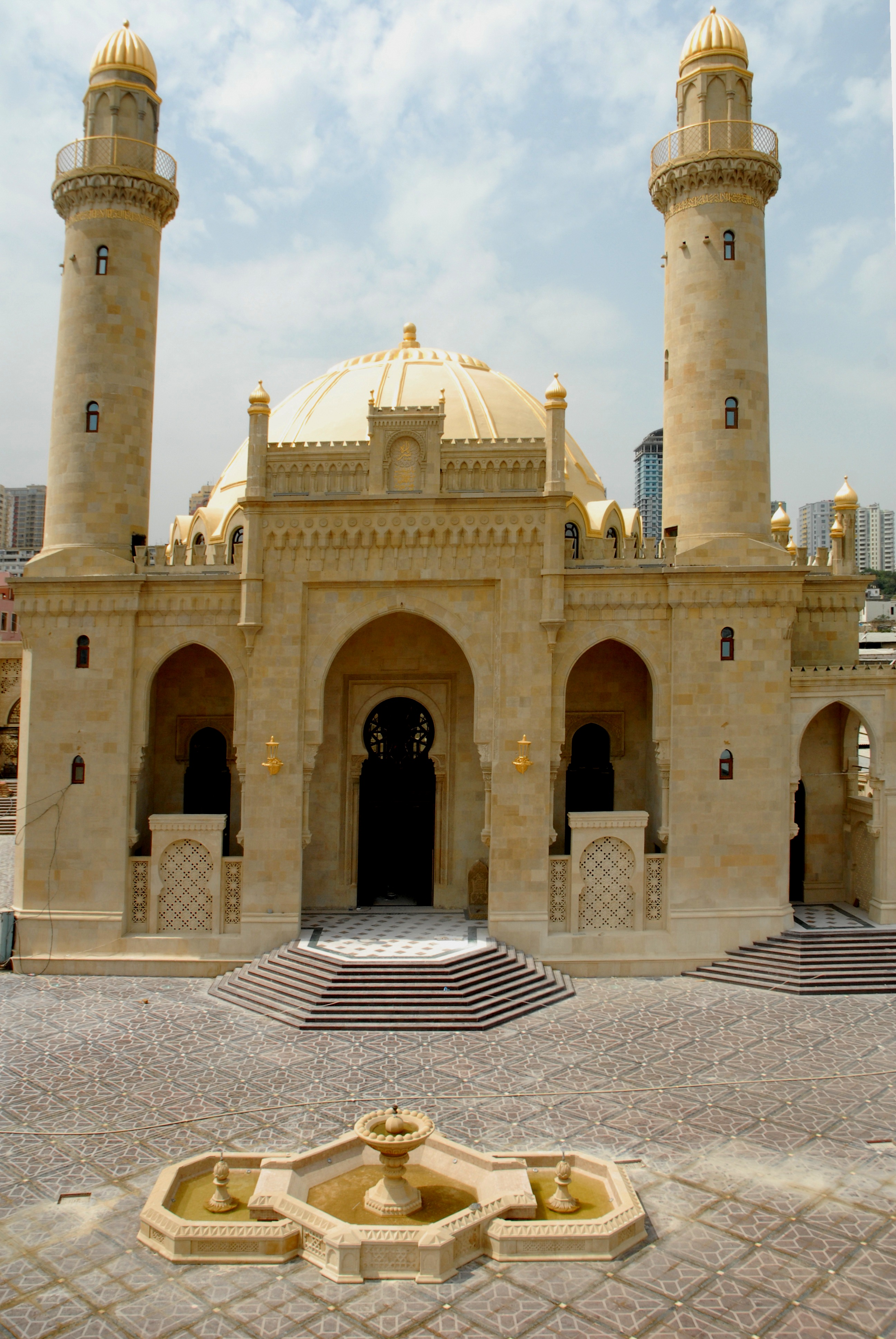
Taza Pir Mosque

Mosque of the Martyrs

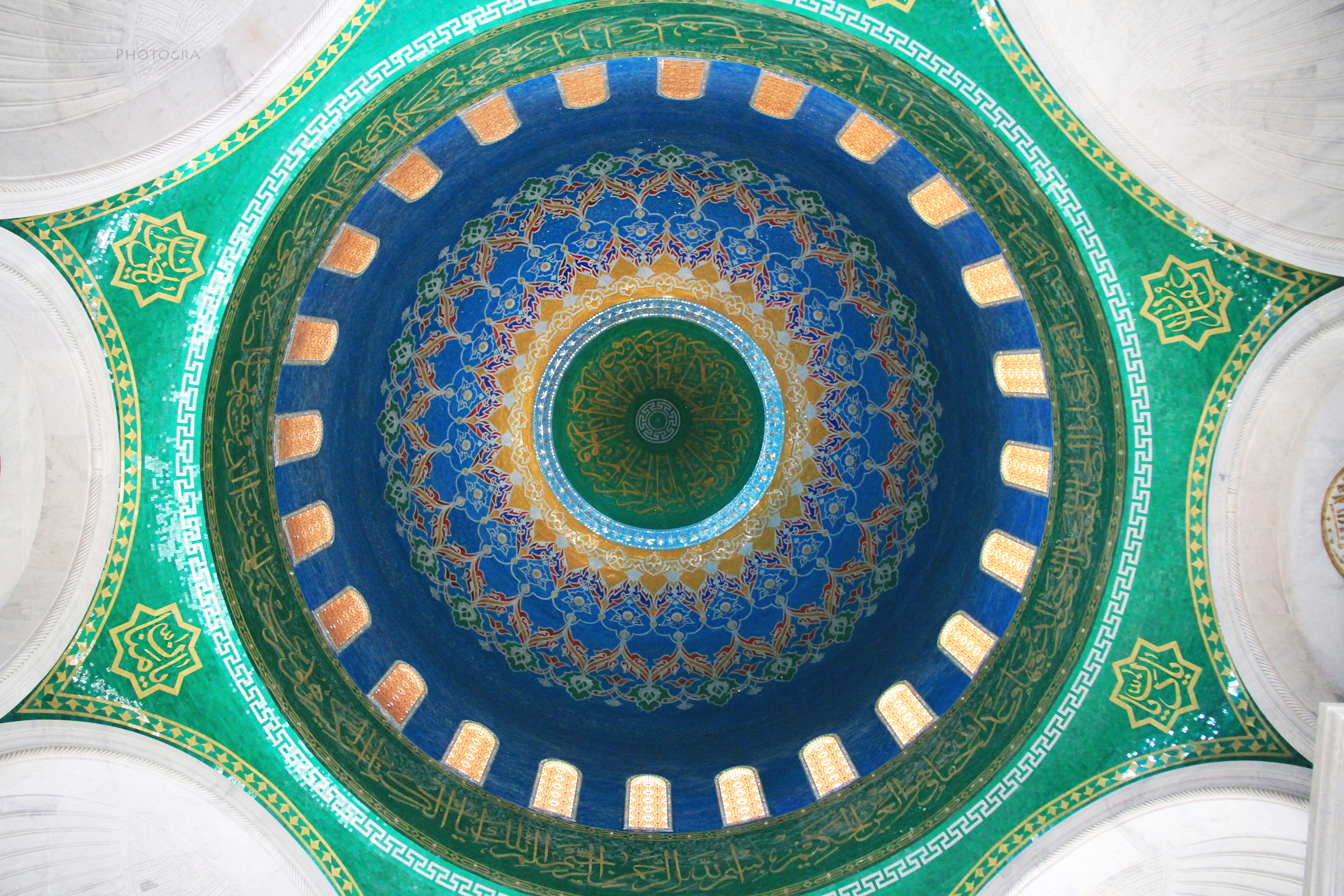
Dome of the Bibi-Heybat Mosque

Heydar Mosque

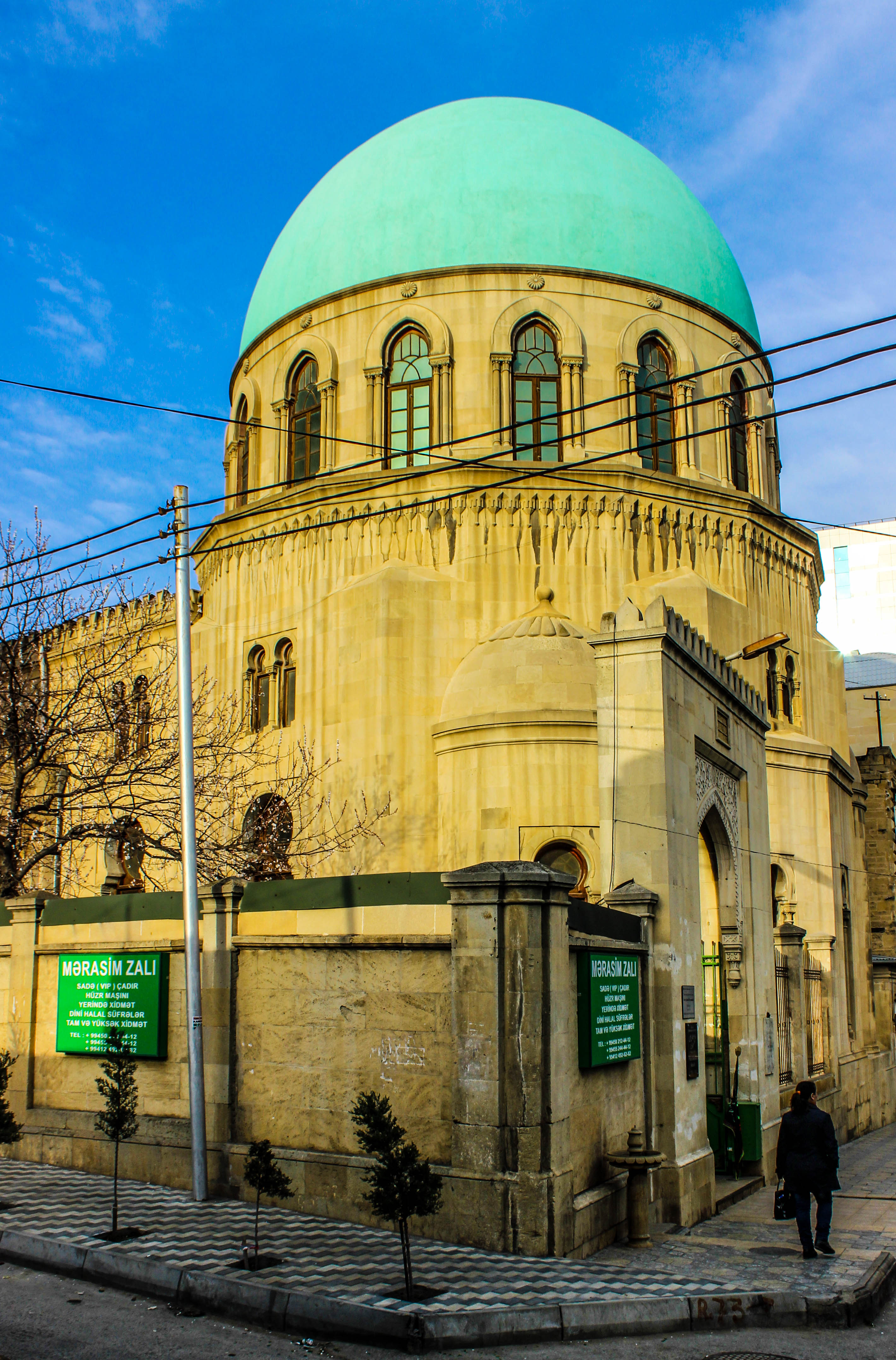
Haji Sultanali Mosque

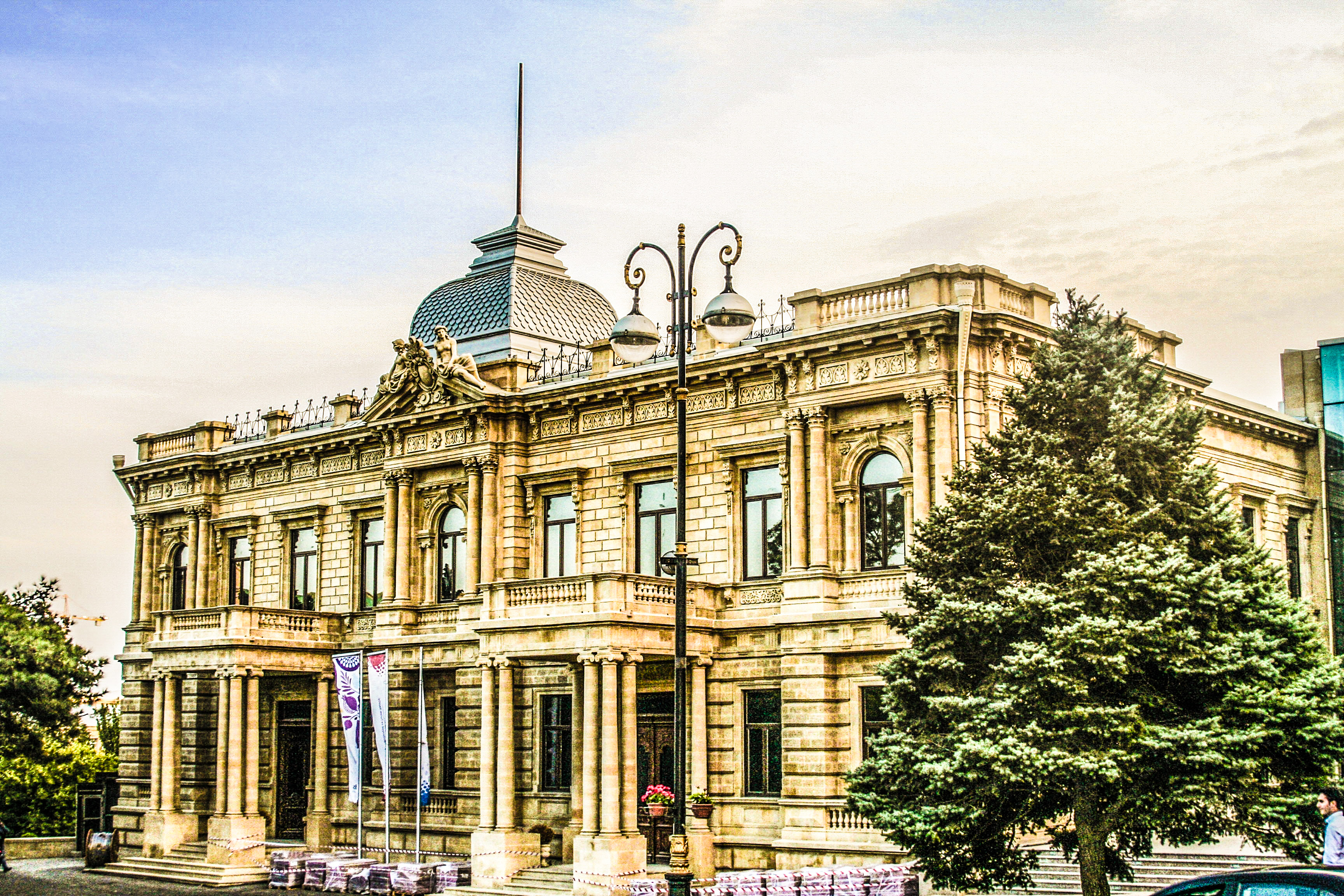
Palace of De Boure

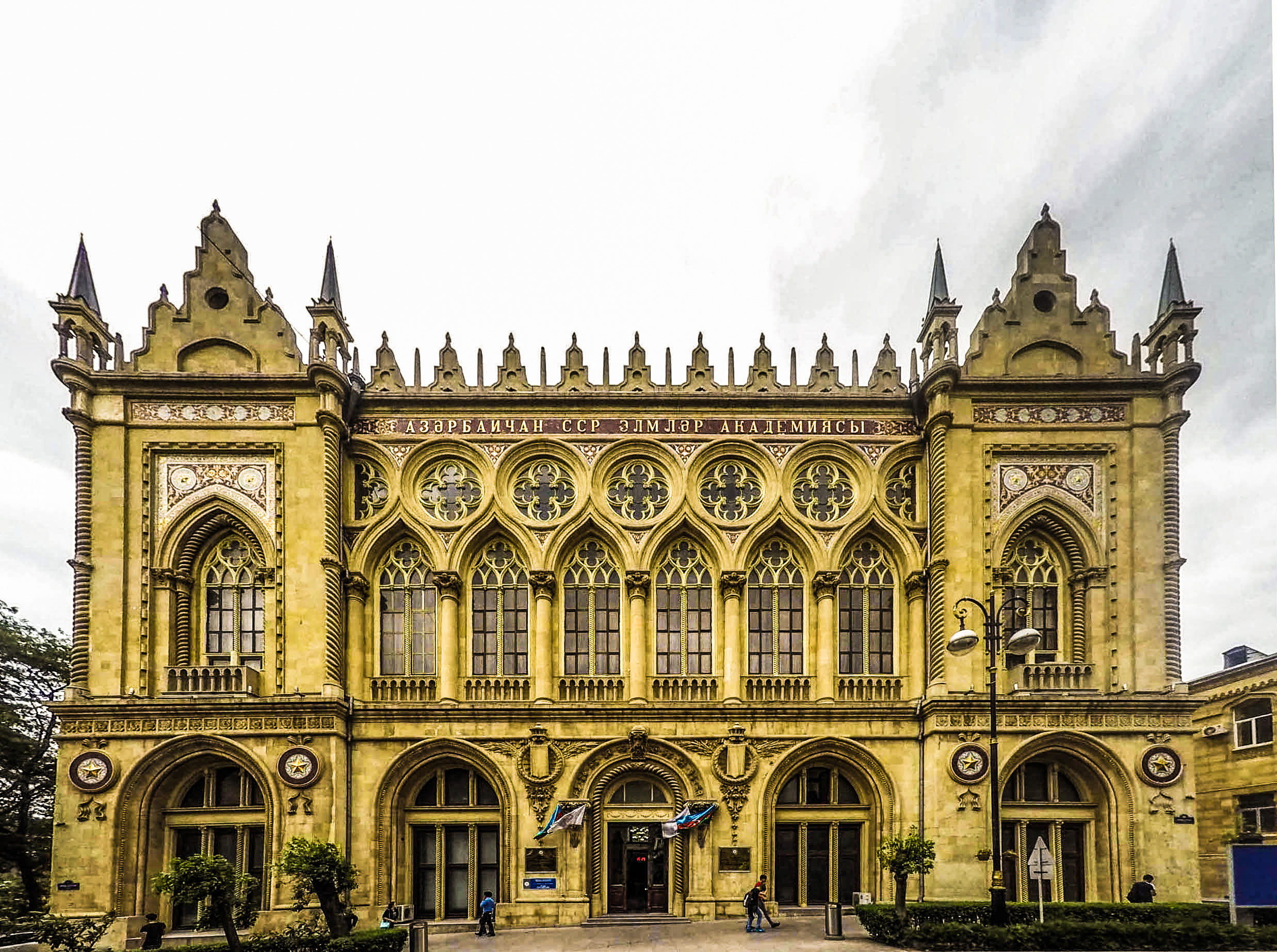
Ismailiyya Palace in Baku

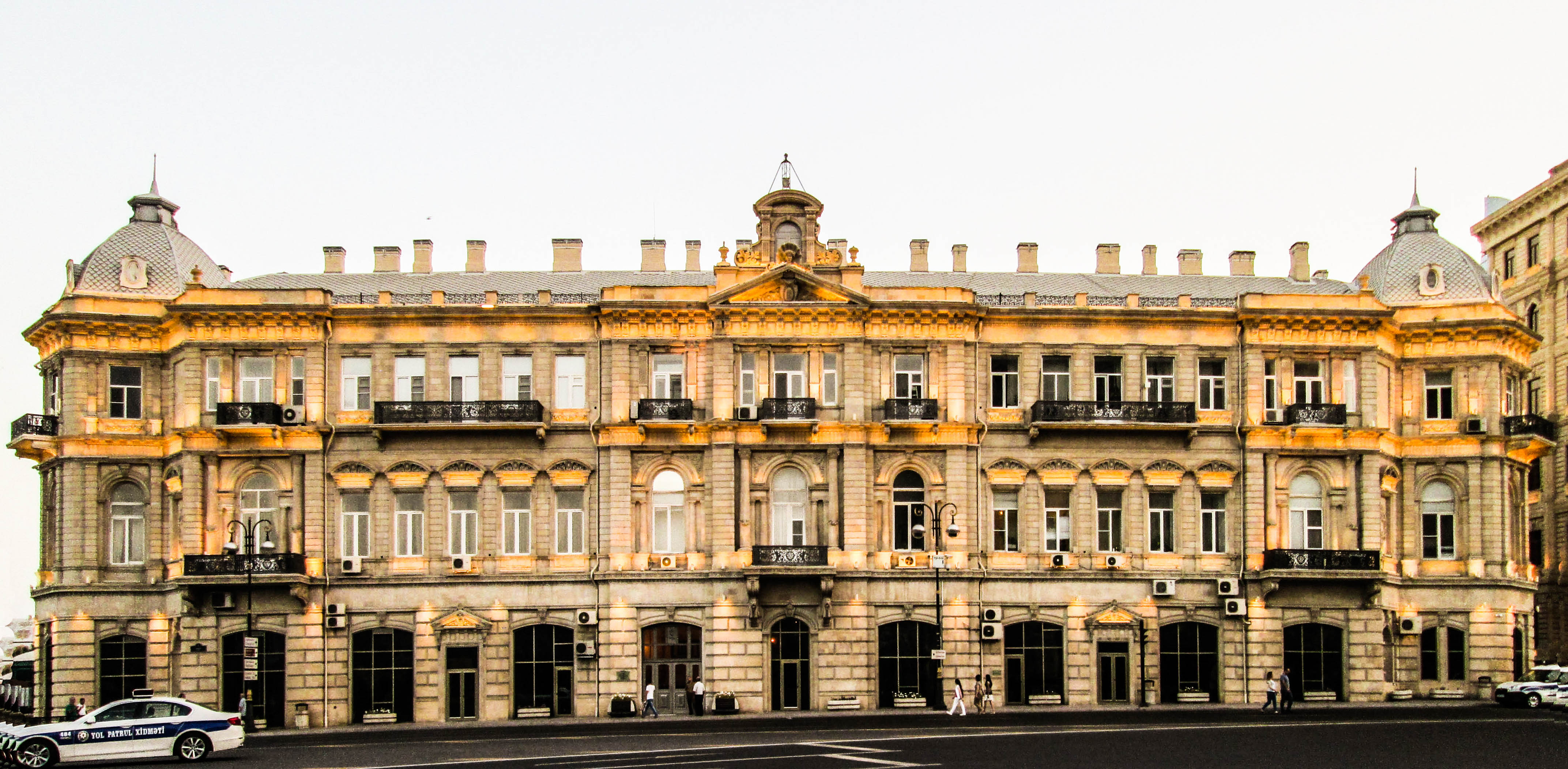
Palace of Seyid Mirbabayev in Baku

Government House in Neftchilar Avenue, Baku.

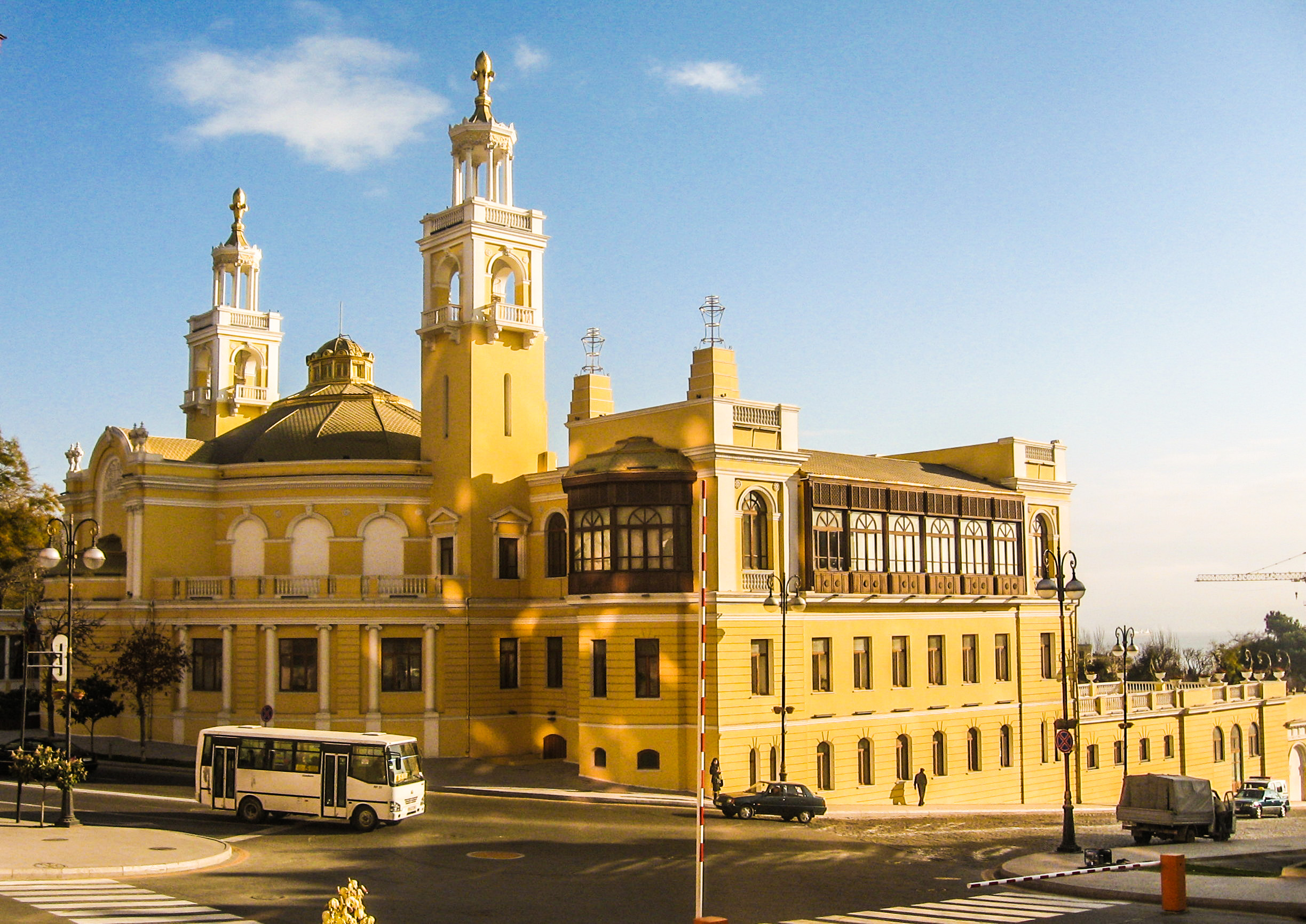
Azerbaijan State Philharmonic Hall

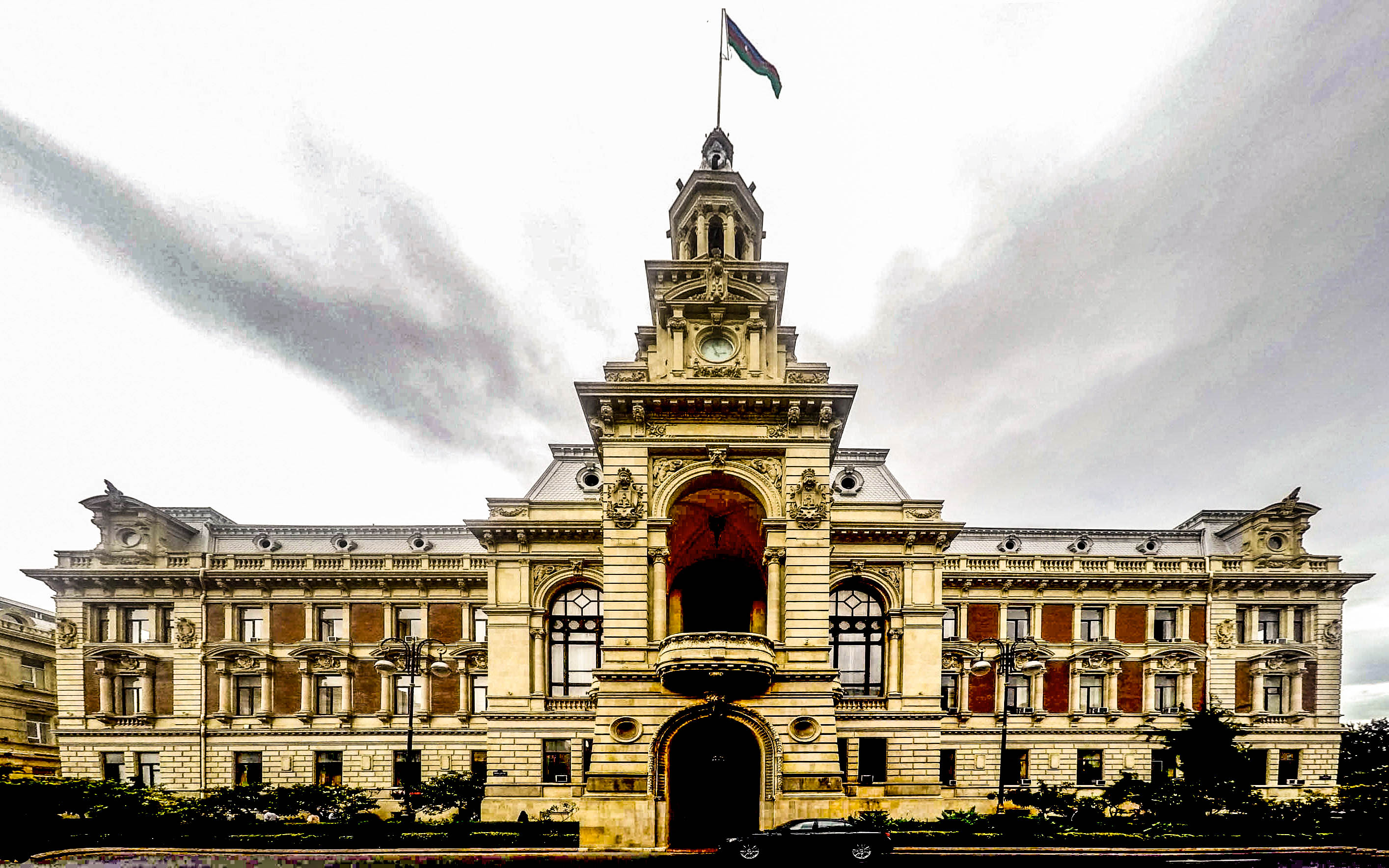
Mayoralty of Baku

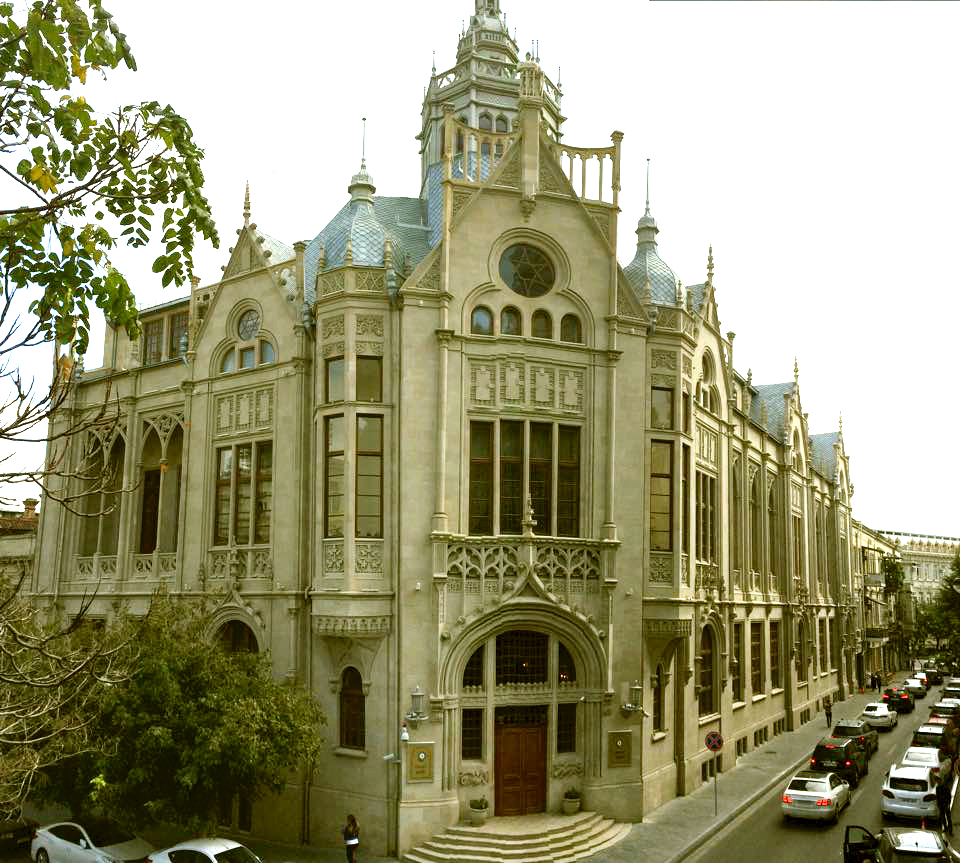
Palace of Happiness

Baku Aquatics Centre

Baku Crystal Hall

JW Marriott Absheron Baku Hotel

Heydar Aliyev Cultural Center

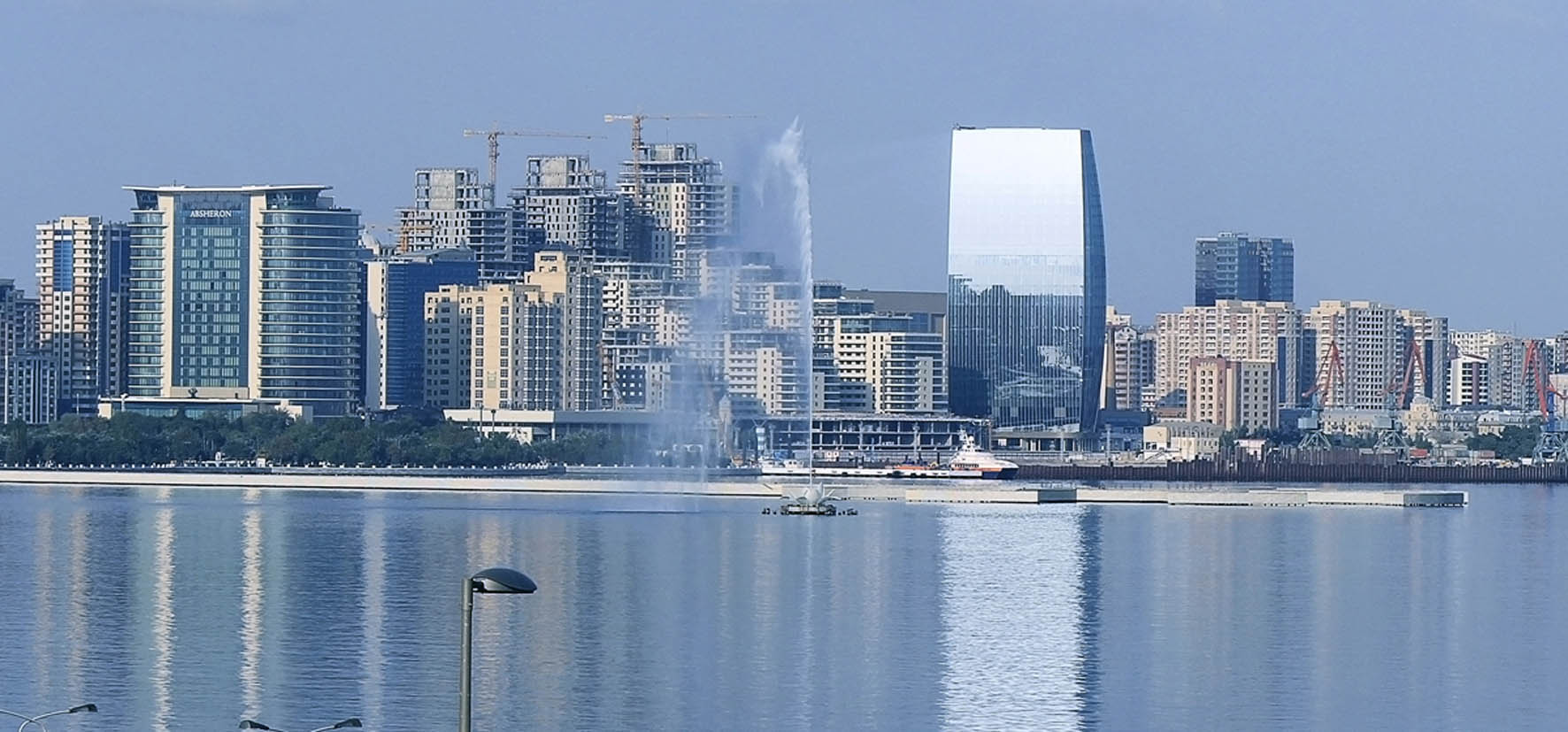
Port Baku Towers and Port Baku Residence

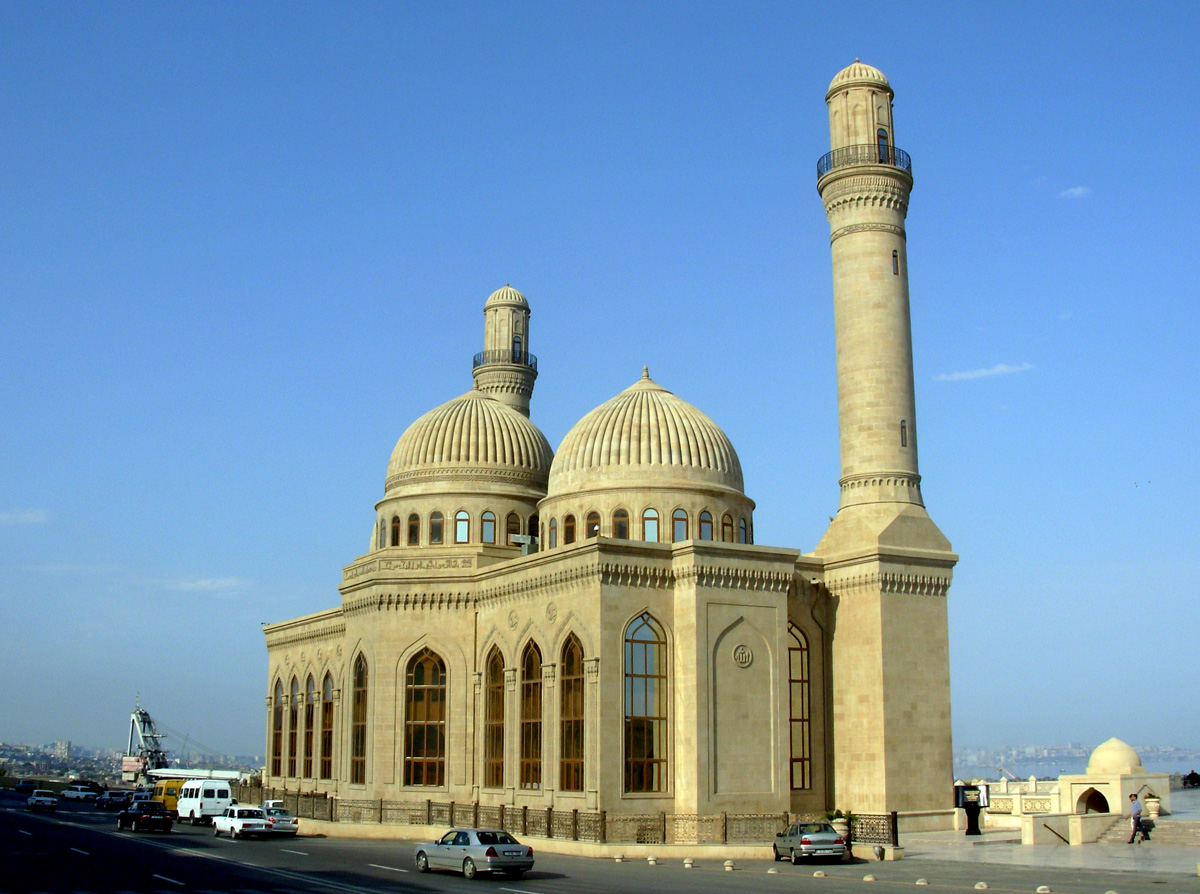
Bibi-Heybat Mosque

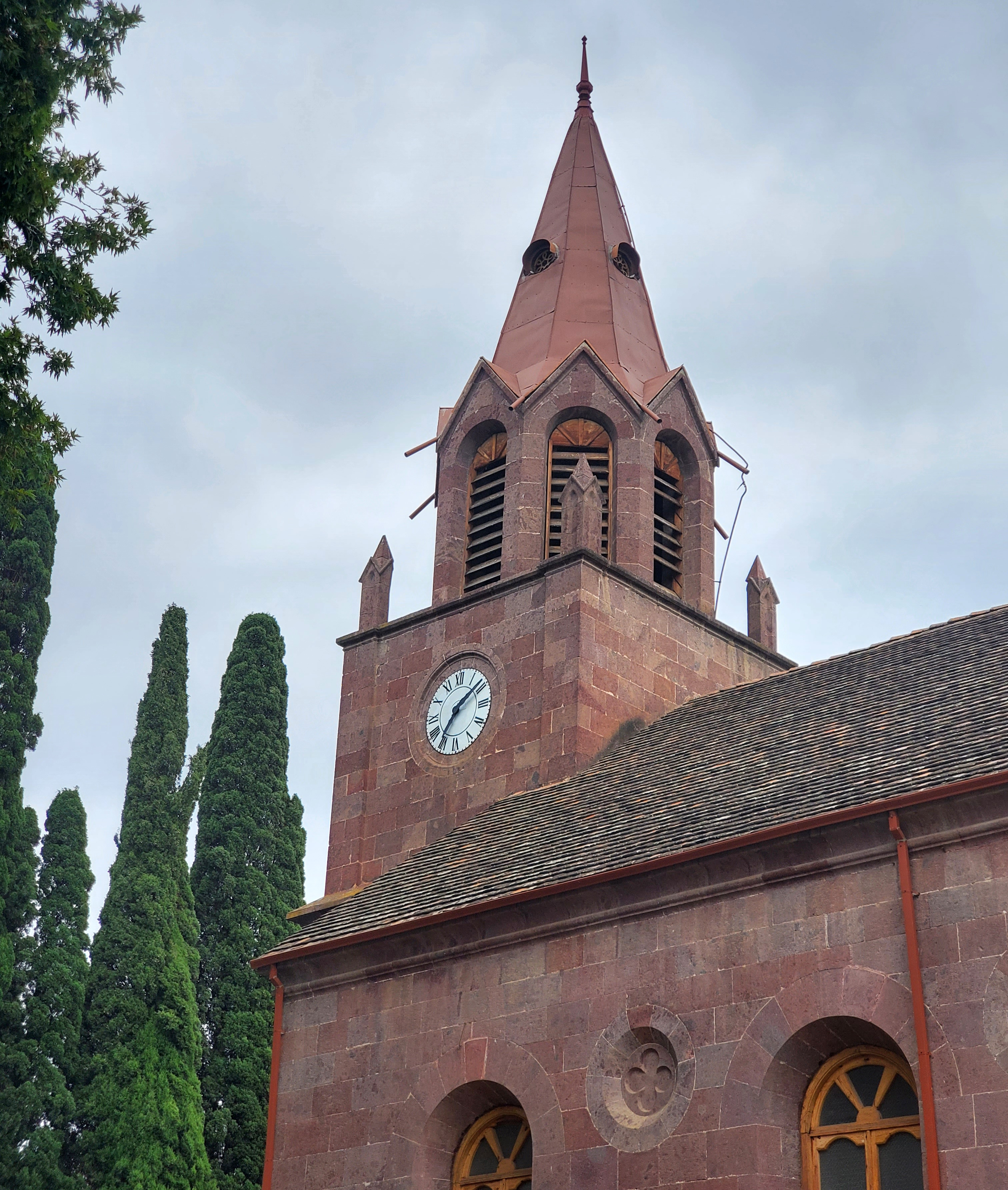
St. John's Church

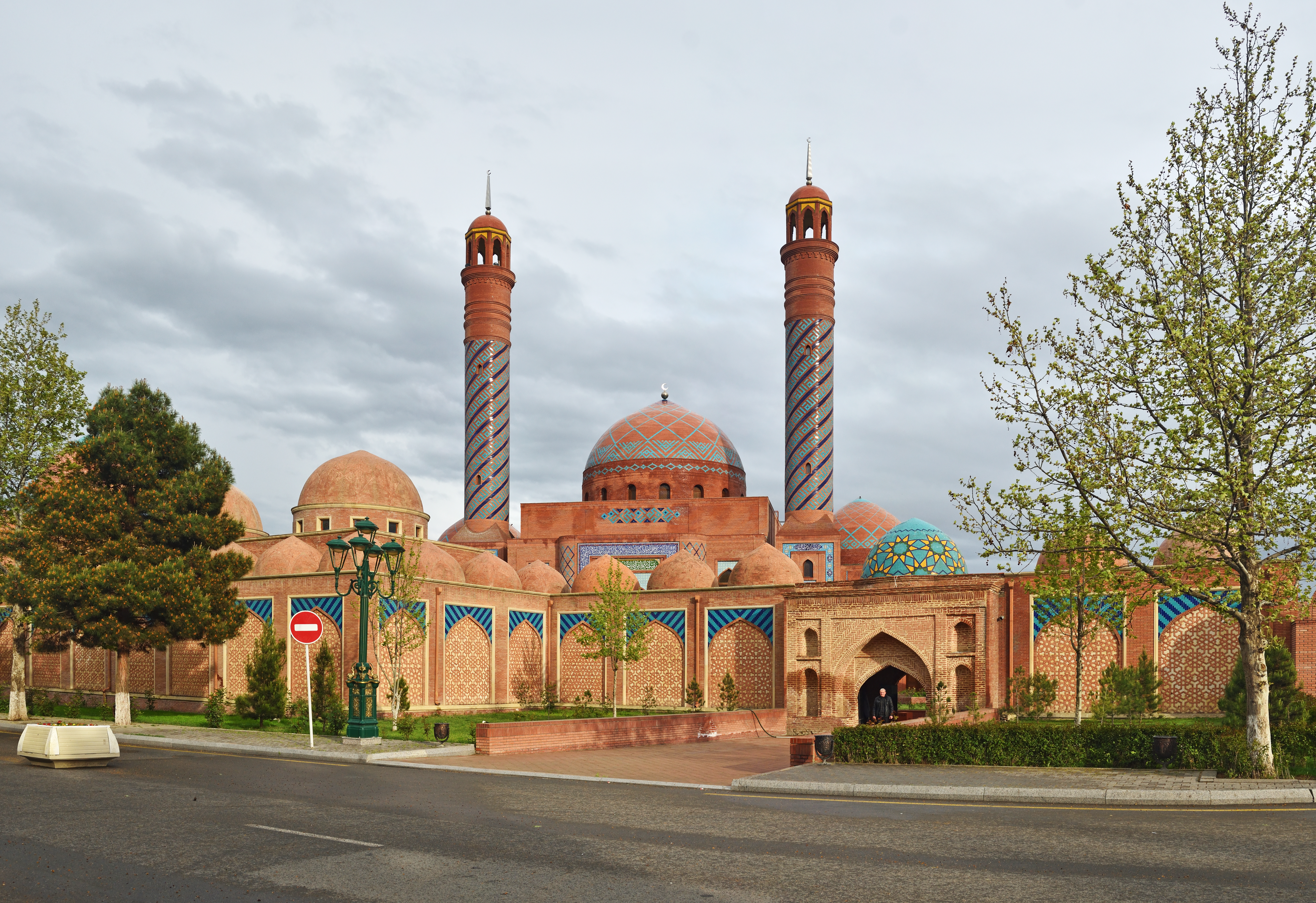
Imamzadeh Complex (Ganja)

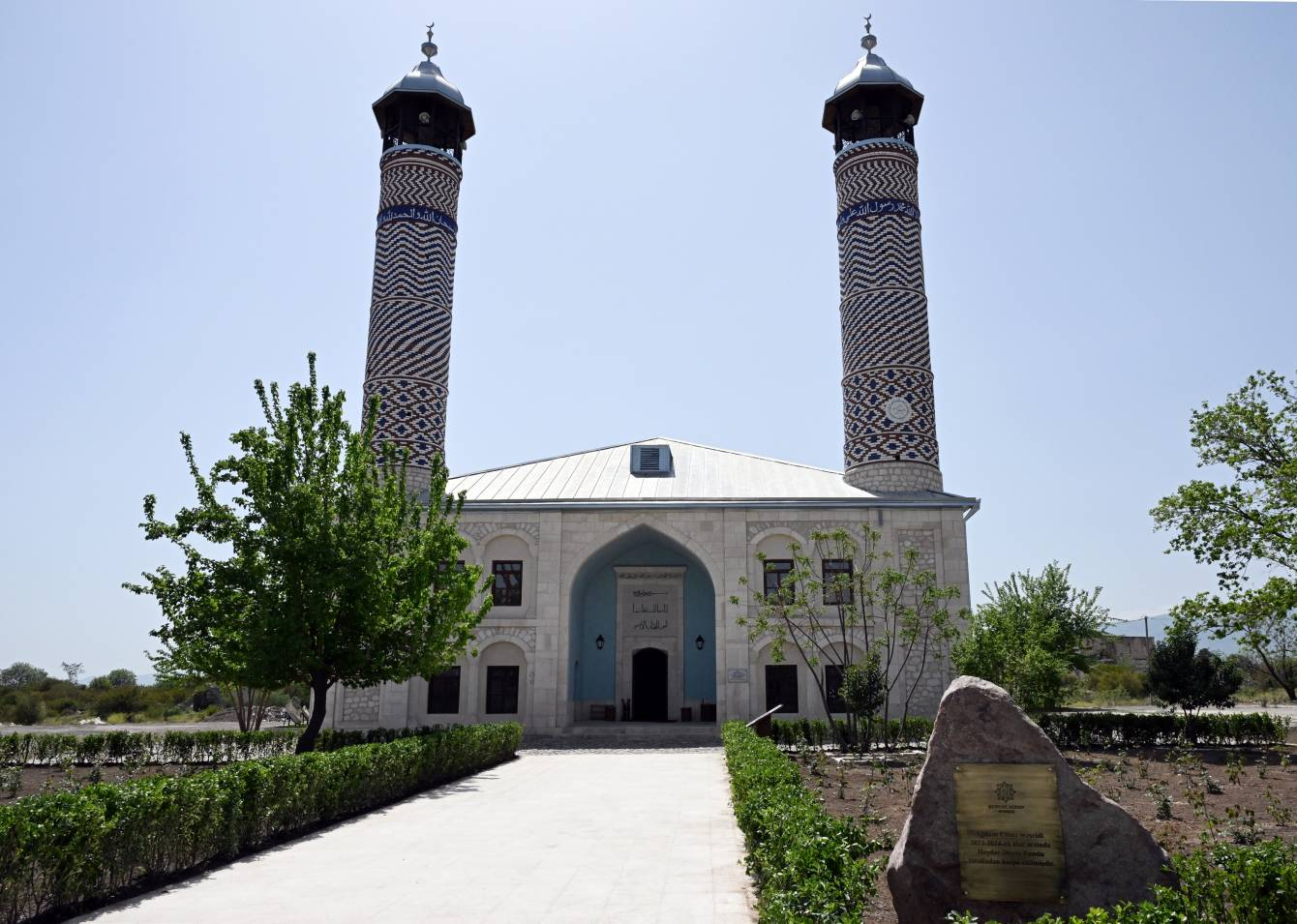
Agdam Mosque

== See also ==
- Architecture of Baku
- Culture of Azerbaijan
- List of architectural monuments of world importance registered in Azerbaijan
