= Nizami Cinema Center =

Cinema in Baku, Azerbaijan

Coordinates: 40.3755°N 49.8436°E

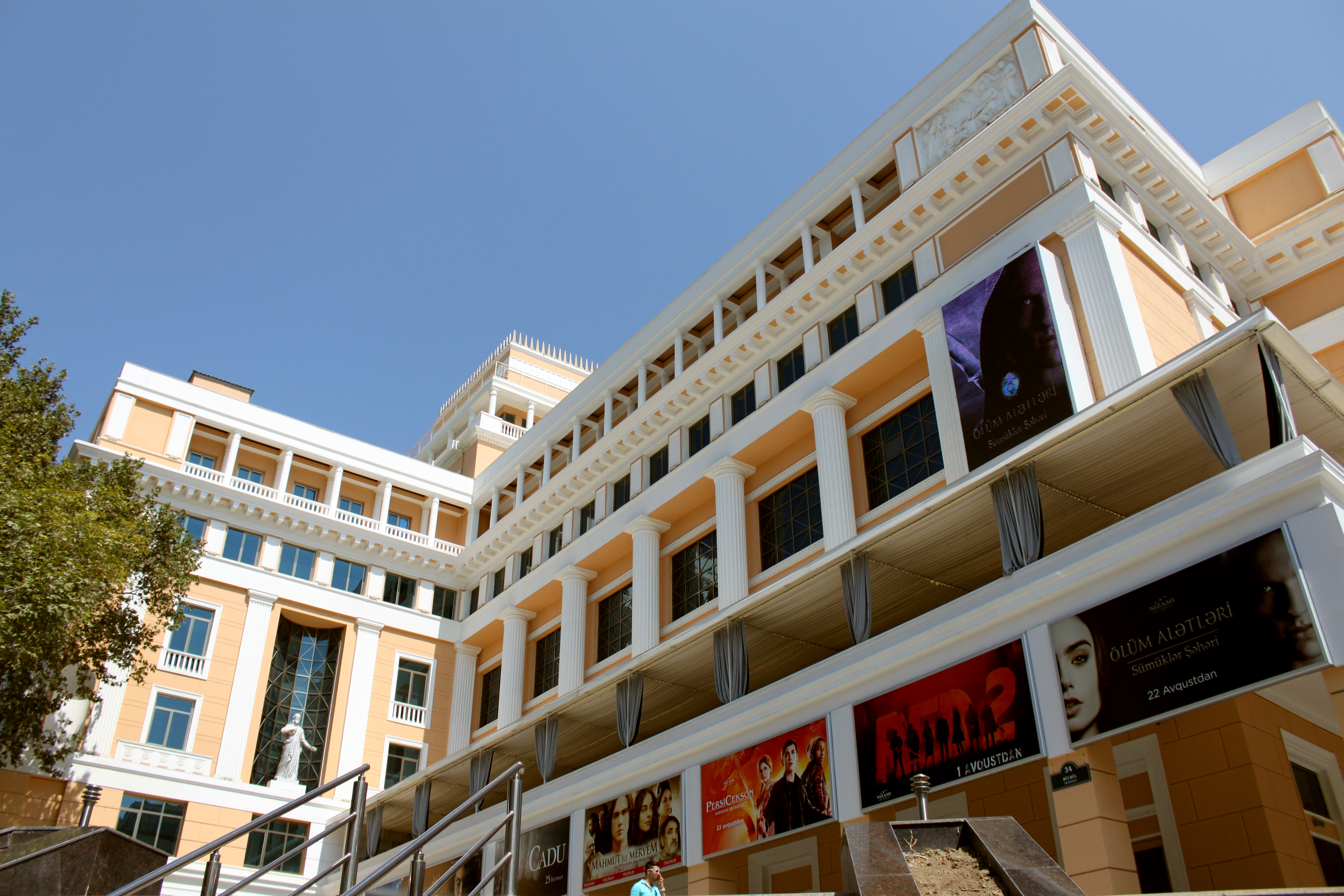
Nizami Cinema Center

The Nizami Cinema Center is a multiscreen cinema in Baku, Azerbaijan. It was built in 1940 and re-opened in 2011.

== History and performance ==
Built in 1940, this is one of the oldest cinemas of the country. The cinema center was named after the poet Nizami Ganjavi. In Soviet times, this cinema hosted film festivals and premieres of new works of domestic and foreign filmmaking.

During the difficult period of the late 1980s and early 1990s, the interest in going to the movies somewhat weakened. Since the late 1990s–early 2000s, new cinemas started to emerge in the country, equipped with advanced projection and sound technology which showed the latest movies of world cinema. Gradually, the cinemas became attractive again to townspeople and tourists alike. After a thorough renovation in the framework of the “State program on development of Azerbaijani cinema in 2008–2018”, the Nizami cinema opened its doors to visitors in 2011. It now holds the status of “cinema center”. The opening night of national films are held here, together with previews of films in the current program, including new films from other countries and those in 3-D format.

== Structure of building ==
Two cinema rooms for 50 and 80 seats are located on the ground floor while the first floor houses a large cinema room with 500 seats, having one of the largest screens in the South Caucasus (18 meters wide). The fourth floor of the cinema has a VIP room with 24 seats.

All the rooms of the Cinema Center are equipped with the technology facilities, projection and sound equipment. On the ground floor of the Cinema Center there are commercial kiosks, on the first floor – cafés, on the third floor – a coffee club and a press-center, as well as a 250-seat two-story restaurant and offices on the fourth and fifth floors. The ceiling of the restaurant is automatically opens and closes depending on the time of year.
