= List of architectural monuments of world importance registered in Azerbaijan =

The list of architectural monuments of world importance registered in Azerbaijan is the list of architectural monuments of world importance approved by the decision No. 132 of the Cabinet of Ministers of the Republic of Azerbaijan dated August 2, 2001 and indicated to be registered in Azerbaijan. The oldest monuments on the list are the Lekit church in the territory of Qakh District and Chirag Gala in the territory of Şabran District, belonging to the period of Caucasian Albania. Twelve of the listed monuments are on the UNESCO World Heritage List, and sixteen are on the reserve (candidate) list. Nine of the listed monuments are cultural, architectural and historical reserves.

== List ==
№	Monument	Address	Short description	Picture	Coordinations
1	Ateshgah	Bakı, Suraxanı raion	The temple was built in the village of Surakhani near Baku by fire-loving Indian merchants - Parsis in the 18th century. The earliest construction of the temple, the stable, dates back to 1713 AD, and the central shrine was built in 1810 with the funds of the merchant Kanchanagara.		40°24′55.59″S 50°0′31″W
2	İçərişəhər	Bakı, Səbail raion	"Icherisheher", popularly known as "Gala" or simply "Old City", the historical quarter is the oldest part of Baku, as well as a historical-architectural reserve. Icherisheher, the oldest part of Baku, is surrounded by well-preserved fortress walls. The territory of the reserve has been inhabited since the Bronze Age. As a result of archaeological research, it has been established that already in the 8th-9th centuries, the territory of Icherisheher was densely populated, and crafts and trade developed here.		40°21′54.12″S 49°50′9.6″W
2.1	Muhammad Mosque	İçərişəhər, Mirzə Mənsur street, 42	The oldest mosque of Baku that has reached our time. Two: the mosque building, which consists of underground and above-ground floors, was built in the 10th-11th centuries. The mosque was given the name Siniggala Mosque in 1723 after the Russians shelled Baku. The minaret of the oldest mosque of the city was also damaged when the artillery of Peter I, who went on offensive marches along the Caspian coast, shelled Baku on June 26 of the same year. People gave the name "Broken Castle" to the minaret, which continued to hit the ball projectile as a castle constellation.		40°21′55″S 49°50′5″W
2.2	Maiden Tower	İçərişəhər, Asəf Zeynallı street	It is the most magnificent and mysterious architectural monument of Baku, as well as of Absheron. Its height is 28 m, its diameter is 16.5 m on the first floor. The thickness of the wall on the first floor reaches 5 m. The interior of the castle is divided into 8 floors. Each floor is built with hewn stones and covered with a dome-shaped ceiling. The castle has been operating as a museum since 1964, and was included in the UNESCO World Heritage List in 2000. There are circular holes in the middle of these stone ceilings. The holes are in the direction of the vertical line. So, looking through the circular hole in the middle of the ceiling of the VIII floor, it is possible to see the floor of the first floor. The only entrance to the fort is through an arched doorway on its west side, 2 m above ground level and 1.1 m wide.		49°21′58.2″S 49°50′14.1″W
3	Palace of the Shirvanshahs	İçərişəhər, Qala turn 76	The old residence of the Shirvanshahs (Rulers of Shirvan) located in Baku, the capital of Azerbaijan. The construction of the palace is associated with the transfer of the capital from Shamakhi to Baku after the Shamakhi earthquake, in which Shirvanshah Akhsitan I lost his family members. The architects of the complex were based on the ancient traditions of the Shirvan-Absheron school of architecture. The constructions carried out in different periods were connected with both the unity of dimensions and the harmony and proportionality of cubic buildings, domes and portals, which are the main architectural forms.		40°21′58.42″S 49°50′0.49″W
3.1	House of the Shirvanshahs	Palace of the Shirvanshahs	Parts of the palace building did not appear at the same time. The oldest building (probably from the end of the 14th century) is located in the central part (the octagonal hall of the second floor). The part adjacent to the western facade was added a little later. In its plan, the palace presents a mixed figure. The small part of the western, northern and eastern facades form a half-rectangular quadrangle; the rest of the east facade and the south facade are composed of two triangular lanterns, the broken lines between them forming four right angles. Since its construction, the palace building has connected 52 rooms with three narrow winding staircases: the first floor has 27 rooms, the second floor has 25 rooms (there are currently 16 rooms on the second floor), and the layout of the second floor basically repeats the layout of the first floor. The central part of the palace (the octagonal hall of the second floor, the entrance decorated with a portal) has thicker walls. The main entrance on the western facade is decorated with a tall portal. A portal staircase leads to a tall octagonal ornate hall covered by a dome.		40°21′58.42″S 49°50′0.49″W
3.2	Divankhana	Palace of the Shirvanshahs	A small door located in the northern part of the palace garden leads to the closed palace divan room. The monument was built by Shirvanshah Khalilullah in the 15th century. This building is surrounded by an arcade on three sides. In the compositional center of the divankhana stands an octagonal rotunda-pavilion in a tall stylobate. The hall of this rotunda is surrounded by an open arcade of the same order. The elliptical canopy with a slightly pointed top is protected on the outside by a hewn stone dome. The west facade of the rotunda is distinguished by a portal decorated with arabesques (a callenure semi-domed reaching conch based on a system of finely modeled stalactites (or cornices). A portal leads to a hall that connects the hall on the stylobate with the crypt and service rooms.		40°21′58.42″S 49°50′0.49″W
3.3	Palatial mosque in Baku	Palace of the Shirvanshahs	It is located next to the tomb in the lower courtyard of the Shirvanshahs palace. The height of the mosque is 22 meters. From the inscription surrounding the minaret, it is known that the monument was built in 1441–1142 by order of Shirvanshah I Khalilullah. There is a well and a small pool on the north side of the courtyard for washing and ablution before entering the mosque. Due to its architectural form, the mosque is very simple. Its entrance portal is unadorned, but the minaret is striking for its elegance and beauty. The stalactites supporting its balcony and the inscription belt below are highly artistic. The minaret is completed with a slicing dome. The surroundings of the porch are decorated with carvings, as in other large mosque minarets, and are surrounded by a stone railing. Later, when the city was shelled by the Russian army, the stone railing was replaced by an iron railing in the 19th century.		40°21′58.42″S 49°50′0.49″W
3.4	Mausoleum of Seyid Yahya Bakuvi	Palace of the Shirvanshahs	To the south of the palace courtyard, near the palace, there is the Seyid Yahya mausoleum, which was built in the second half of the 15th century and is also called the "Darvish mausoleum". Here is the grave of Seyid Yahya Bakuvi, who was a court scientist of Khalilullah I and was engaged in medicine, mathematics and astrology. The body of the mausoleum is octagonal, and the upper part is pyramidal. The interior decoration of the mausoleum consists of an underground vault. Bakuvin's grave and a camera are located here.		40°21′58.42″S 49°50′0.49″W
3.5	Shirvanshah's Palace Mausoleum	Palace of the Shirvanshahs	It is located in the area of the lower courtyard of the Shirvanshahs Palace, next to the Shah Mosque. A large circular enclosed wall separates the lower courtyard from the other. When looking at the tomb from above, it can be seen that the cut is a rectangle decorated with a star and completed with a 6-pointed dome. During construction, blue tiles were placed in the star-shaped slots on the dome. The name of the architect is written in the medallion that decorates the portal with an inscription that can only be read through a mirror: "Allah, Architect Muhammad Ali".		40°21′58.42″S 49°50′0.49″W
3.6	Murad's Gate	Palace of the Shirvanshahs	It is the only building of the Shirvanshahs palace complex dating back to the 16th century. The following is written between the 2 medallions on the upper frame of the portal of the Murad's Gate: "This building was built by order of Ulu Rajab Bakuvi in 994 (1585-1586) during the reign of the great and just Sultan Murad III." The inscriptions next to the wall recesses of the portal reveal the name of Tabriz architect Amirshah. Due to its general, artistic decorative composition, the portal corresponds to the Divankhana and Tomb portals. However, the quality of construction equipment and building stones is much lower here.		40°21′58.42″S 49°50′0.49″W
3.7	Hamam	Palace of the Shirvanshahs	It is located in the lowest courtyard of the Shirvanshahs palace complex. It was built in the 15th century. Like all the baths of the Old City, this bath was built underground to maintain a stable temperature regime. Over time, the thickness of the soil layer increased and completely covered it. The bath was accidentally discovered in 1939, partially cleaned in 1953, and conserved in 1961. According to the remaining walls of the bathhouse, it can be said that its rooms were covered with a dome.		40°21′58.42″S 49°50′0.49″W
3.8	Keygubad Mosque	Palace of the Shirvanshahs	There was a mosque-madrasa building adjacent to the Seyid Yahya Bakuvi mausoleum of the Shirvanshahs palace complex. The mausoleum is located in the southern part of the mosque. The mosque consists of a rectangular prayer hall and a small corridor in front of it. The mosque consists of a rectangular prayer hall and a small corridor in front of it. At one time, there were 4 columns supporting the dome in the center of the hall.		40°21′58.42″S 49°50′0.49″W
4	Defense facilities on the Caspian coast. Complex of fortresses, caravansaries and hunting grounds.	The west coast of the Caspian Sea	Since the mountainous areas of the Caucasus are provided with natural protection, Azerbaijan needed to protect only the Caspian coastal areas. For this purpose, a system of defense facilities, which were built in different periods of history and are connected to each other, was created. Caspian coastal defense facilities are located in the areas from Darbend to the Absheron peninsula.		48°1′1″S 42°1′21″W
4.1	Great Mardakan Fortress	Mərdəkan	A castle with an ancient history in the Mardakan settlement of Baku. The castle was built in the middle of the 14th century in the form of four corners by Akhsitan I, the son of Manuchohr III the Great. Mardakan Castle was built in honor of Akhsitan I's brilliant victory over the enemy. The castle was used as a shelter and guard post for feudal lords. The height of the castle is 22 meters, the thickness is 2.10 meters from the bottom, and 1.60 meters from the top. The inner yard is 28x25. From the inside, the castle is divided into 5 levels.		40°29′31.74″S 50°8′26.41″W
4.2	Small Mardakan Fortress	Mərdəkan	A round castle located in Mardakan. The height of the castle is 12.5 meters, the interior consists of 3 levels. It is known from the inscription above the castle that it was built in 1232 by the architect Abdulmajid Masud oglu. The fortress surrounding the castle consists of a square-shaped (25x25 m) courtyard surrounded by seven-meter-high stone walls on all sides. The walls of the fence have towers, railings and mazgals. The castle, which is circular in plan, narrows as it goes up.		40°29′44.6″S 50°8′49.6″W
4.3	Ramana Tower	Ramana	It is a 12th-century castle in Ramana village. The height of the castle is 15 meters. The exact time of construction of the white stone castle is not known. Presumably, it was built for defense purposes and was used as a castle during the Shirvanshahs state. There are two stairs on the left side of the wall to climb the castle walls. With one of them, it is possible to go up to the corridor, which is built from the inside of the wall, about half a meter to the outside, by means of a spiral stone staircase. Another stone staircase goes up from the courtyard of the castle. Through these stairs it is possible to climb the castle walls and watch the village.		40°27′22″S 49°58′48″W
4.4	Nardaran Fortress	Nardaran	In the north-west of Nardara, a medieval (XIV century) white stone fortification round castle. The height of the castle, whose architect is Mahmud Sad oglu, is 12.5 meters. It is clear from the inscription on the castle that it was built in 1301.		40°33′41″S 50°0′17.33″W
4.5	Sabayil Castle	Baku Bay	Historical architectural monument located in Baku Bay and currently under sea water. Bayil Castle, one of the most beautiful works of the Shirvan-Absheron school of architecture and built in the 13th century, sometimes rises to the surface of the sea with the rising and falling waters of the Caspian Sea, and sometimes becomes invisible. Bayil Castle has an elongated plan according to the shape of the island. The length of the fortress is 180 m, and the average width is 35 m. The castle walls are fortified with six semi-circular towers in the east and five in the west (as in Baku Castle). The construction of the Bayil castle was completed in a politically-military era - when the Mongol campaigns shook the entire Middle East (in 1234-1235). However, the life of this magnificent castle, built on an island near the coast, was very short. According to scientists, it sank into the sea as a result of a strong earthquake in 1306.		40°21′10.8″S 49°50′26.6″W
4.6	Besh Barmak Fortification Wall	Şabran	It is the third dam that closes the Caspian coast crossing. South of Gilgilchay, it started from the steep foothill of Beshbarmag Mountain, separated from the Caucasus Range, and stretched to the sandy beach of the sea. Thus, Beshbarmag mountain from the west and the long wall closed by a clay wall from the east completely cut off the narrow coastal passage. Beshbarmag, Gilgilchay dam and Darband - these three dams built in the early middle ages on the north-eastern borders of Azerbaijan reflect the high level of development of the fortification construction of the period, as well as the political and military situation. According to the hypothesis, they were built in the III-VII centuries (first Beshbarmaq, then Gilgilchay, and finally Darband defensive wall). Beshbarmag and Gilgilchay dams are more numerous and ancient than Darbend dam due to construction technique.		40°55′50.52″S 49°14′8.16″W
4.7	Chirag Gala	Şabran	It is a fortress-wall system built at a height of 1232 meters on the top of a steep rock called Charaqgaya, approximately 20-25 kilometers from the center of Shabran district, 150 km from Baku. Chirag Gala was built by the Sassanid rulers in the IV-VI centuries for the purpose of a fortified guardhouse. It was the main guardhouse of the Gilgilchay wall. From here, it is possible to keep a large area under control and to see the arrival of the enemy and inform the surroundings through bonfires.		41°4′49.38″S 48°56′43.05″W
5	Khachin-Darbatli Mausoleum	Xaçındərbətli, Ağdam	The monument is covered with an octagonal pyramid-shaped dome rising on a relatively low pedestal. The main merit of this monument is not in its volume, but in solving this tradition in a unique structure. The inscription on the entrance door of the Khachindarbetli monument indicates that it was built in 1314 by master Shahbanzar on the grave of Musa oglu Kutlu. The architecture of the entrance surface and the stalactite structure of its inner dome make up the richest part of Khachindarbetli monument. The outer surfaces are decorated with not very deep recesses, and the upper part of these recesses is connected to the arches.		40°1′58.78″S 46°49′1.35″W
6	Barda Mausoleum	Bərdə şəhəri	In the 14th century, two tower-like mausoleum were built in Barda, one of which has survived to modern times. It is known from the inscriptions on when and by whom the monument, which entered the scientific literature under the name of Barda mausoleum dated 1322, was built. Barda mausoleum has attracted the attention of researchers since the 19th century. The famous orientalist Khanikov, who visited Barda in 1848, read the inscriptions on the monument, and these inscriptions were later published by academician Dorn, who visited Barda in 1861. This inscription in the Barda mausoleum shows that Nakhchivan architects were invited to other cities to build responsible buildings as early as the 14th century, and is an extremely valuable example of art that confirms the continuation of the traditions of the Nakhchivan school of architecture.		40°22′59.15″S 47°7′40.24″W
7	Red Bridge	Qazax District	It is a bridge on the border with Georgia in the Qazakh District and crosses the Ehram River. It is one of the rare architectural pearls of Azerbaijan belonging to the middle century. The special name was given to the red stone used in the construction. The name "Broken Bridge" comes from the ruins of an older bridge 95 m downstream. The Red Bridge was built by 12th century Azerbaijani architects. The length of the bridge is 175 m and consists of 4 spans: 26.1–8.0–16.1–8.2. The ceilings are made of 22x22x4 cm bricks. The width of the working road is 4.3 m, and the exits are 12.4 m.		41°19′45.2″S 45°4′23.2″W
8	Temple	Ləkit, Qax	An ancient Albanian temple located 1 km from the village of Lekit, Qakh District. Lekit Temple is one of the most beautiful examples of Albanian architecture. In terms of construction techniques, experts attribute the construction history of the church to the IV-VI centuries. The Lekit temple was the basis for the formation of South Caucasian tetraconchs. The church was created on the basis of an ancient Zoroastrian temple. The scientific study and restoration of the temple were carried out in the 40s of the 20th century under the leadership of Baranovsky. The surrounding area of the temple was cleared of forest and one of the crumbling walls was strengthened. It is believed that the temple was converted into a church during the reign of Momun Vachagan III, the ruler of Albania.		41°29′36″S 46°51′23″W
9	Xınalıq	Quba District	The village and the center of that territorial unit in the administrative territorial unit of the same name of Quba District. It is the historical and central settlement of the Khinalig people. During the Guba Khanate, it was the center of Khinalig District, Khinalig Village Soviet during the USSR, and now the center of Khinalig Municipality (since 1999). One of the highest settlements in the world (2350 meters above sea level). The Khinalig phenomenon, which has a history of 5000 years, is one of the richest ethnographic values not only in the history of Azerbaijan, but also in the history of mankind, an ancient settlement.		41°10′41″S 38°7′36″W
10	Gandzasar monastery	Vəngli, Kəlbəcər	13th century Christian Armenian monastery located in Vangli village of Kalbajar District, on the left bank of Khachinchay. In the Middle Ages, the monastery was the central residence of the Albanian Apostolic Church. From the epigraphic inscription on the stone on the wall of the temple, it is known that this monument "was built by the ruler of the high and great Arsakh country, the tsar of the vast Albanian province, the grandson of Hasan the Great, the son of Vakhtang, Hasan Jalal Davla and his mother Horisha Khatun in 1216-1238".		40°3′24.62″S 46°31′52.44″W
11	Dadivank	Bağlıpəyə, Kəlbəcər	Albanian monastery located in the territory of the village of Kalbajar Bağlipaya. Mina Khatun, the wife of Prince Hasan Jalal of Khach, was buried here, her mother Arzu Khatun and Mkhitar Gosh, a prominent intellectual of the time, visited this temple and laid memorial stones. The complex includes a total of nine buildings. Five of them are main buildings and others are auxiliary and service buildings. Not all of the monuments included in the complex have reached our time in good condition, the older ones are relatively destroyed.		40°9′41.01″S 46°17′16.85″W
12	Khudafarin Bridges	Cəbrayıl	It is the remains of a bridge dating back to the XI-XII centuries, located on the Iran-Azerbaijani border, on the Araz River. The 15-span bridge, 750 m west of the 15-span bridge, is built entirely of stone and covered with well-hewn large stone slabs. Researchers are of the opinion that this bridge was rebuilt on the remains of the ancient bridge in the 13th century, during the reign of the Ilkhanid (Hulakus). Its length is about 130 meters, its width is 6 m, and its height above the river level is 12 m. The three central arches of the bridge survived, while the coastal arches were destroyed in the 30s of the 20th century by the joint decision of Iran and the USSR to cut the connections between North and South Azerbaijan.		39°9′2.17″S 46°56′24.27″W
13	Khudafarin Bridges	Cəbrayıl	It is a 13th-century bridge located on the Iran-Azerbaijani border, on the Araz River. According to Hamdullah Qazvini, it was "...built in the 15th year of the Hijri (639) by Bakr ibn Abdullah, the companion of the Prophet Muhammad." Since the supports of the bridge arches are raised on natural foundations - rocks, the spans are of different sizes and freely arranged. The arches of the fifteen-span bridge, built of baked bricks and river stones, are pointed. The total length of the bridge is about 200 meters, the width is 4.5 m, the greatest height above the river level is 12 m, the largest arch span is 8.70 m, the smallest arch span is 5.80 m. While all the arches of the bridge are made of brick, the main mass is made of river stone. On the upper floor, the masonry is also made of brick, which is characteristic of the Arran school of architecture. The compatibility of these two materials gives the bridge a unique artistic and constructive appearance.		39°9′2.17″S 46°56′24.27″W
14	Lahıc Dövlət Tarix-Mədəniyyət Qoruğu	İsmayıllı	It is a historical and cultural reserve created in the territory of the historical settlement located in Ismayilli District. Lahij Historical and Cultural Reserve was established by the decision of the Council of Ministers of the Azerbaijan SSR dated December 1980. The reserve is engaged in the protection of about 100 historical and cultural monuments, natural landscape, traditions of the population, urban planning and craft culture in the area of 80 ha of the settlement of Lahic and the village of Eregit. 92 state-registered historical and cultural monuments in the territory of the reserve were built according to local urban planning and architectural rules. So, it was registered as a historical and cultural monument, and all other buildings were built using river stone and installing ketils. Among the historical and cultural monuments, the buildings intended for general use - mosques, bridges, baths and fountain buildings - were built with special taste - forged river stone, lime and brick. Apart from the historical and cultural monuments, the stone flooring of the streets and squares of the area and the kuraband (sewerage) system covering the entire area are also the most important elements of the unique urban planning culture of Lahij.		40°50′57.16″S 48°23′1.44″W
15	Yusif ibn Kuseyir Mausoleum	Naxçıvan	Located in Nakhchivan city, it is a historical architectural monument created by the architect Ajami Nakhchivani, one of the greatest representatives of the Nakhchivan-Maraga school of architecture. The mausoleum, built in 1161–1162, is double-layered, both layers are octagonal in plan. As the sarcophagus is buried underground, the mausoleum looks like a one-story tower from the outside. The mausoleum of Yusif Küseyir oglu is remembered at first sight for its geometrical purity, the delicacy of its proportions and its harmonic beauty. The sarcophagus is covered with a dome with a flat middle according to the double-sided plan. In the upper tower, both the inner and outer faces of the octahedron have shallow pointed arches (pointed on the inside, rectangular on the outside). The whole mausoleum is built of baked bricks and is characterized by high construction techniques. An octagonal hole made in the floor of the upper chamber of the mausoleum opens into the crypt below it. The roof of the crypt is in the form of a complex dome. There are small protrusions between the wall planes and the dome. The top of the sarcophagus dome is completed with a truncated octagonal dome. The mausoleum of Yusif Küseyir oglu is the only monument among the tower-shaped tombs of Azerbaijan whose top pyramidal roof has been preserved for more than 800 years.		39°12′6.74″S 45°24′50″W
16	Momine Khatun Mausoleum	Naxçıvan	Ajami Nakhchivani's masterpiece and one of the most valuable monuments of Nakhchivan-Maraga school of architecture. It is located in the historical center of Nakhchivan city — within the Atabeylar Architectural Complex. Momine Khatun's mausoleum is the only monument from that complex that has reached our time. The mausoleum was built in 1186–1187 by the order of Muhammad Jahan Pahlavan. The floor plan of the mausoleum tower is octagonal on the outside and circular on the inside. Studies have shown that choosing a decagonal plan is not accidental. The plan-spatial structure of Momine Khaunt's mausoleum is built on the ten principle as a whole. This is the basis of the golden division, which creates great proportion and harmony.		39°12′18.26″S 45°24′22.17″W
17	Garabaghlar Mausoleum	Qarabağlar, Şərur	It is an architectural complex consisting of a tomb and a capital belonging to the Ilkhanate period. The Garabaghlar monuments are in the form of a complex, which includes a mausoleum, a double minaret and the remains of a religious building located between these two monuments. The double minarets included in this complex are believed to have been built at the end of the 12th century or the beginning of the 13th century. The portal structure connecting these two minarets belongs to the 14th century. The name of Godai khatu is read on this small portal. Goday Khatun may be Goday Khatun who was the wife of Abaqa Khan (1265-1282). Therefore, it can be concluded that the architect who set the goal of creating this memorial monument in honor of Godai Khatu within the complex of new buildings built in the 12th-13th centuries, built this portal at that time. The features of style and construction techniques allow us to attribute the mausoleum to the reign of Sultan Abu Said Bahadur Khan (1319-1335), and the minarets to the 12th century.		39°25′0″S 45°11′0″W
18	Gulustan Mausoleum	Cuğa, Culfa	The ruins of the early medieval city of Juga are one of the few architectural monuments that have survived to our time in the area. The mausoleum, which is believed to have been built in the late 12th-early 13th century, is located in a green valley on the bank of the Araz river. Since there is no inscription on the mausoleum, the exact date of construction, customer, in whose honor it was built and the architect are not known. The Gulustan mausoleum belongs to the type of tower-like tomb in which the crypt layer is raised above the ground and therefore the outer capacity is a double-layered structure. Built entirely of red tuff, only the inter-layered inner dome of the mausoleum is made of bricks. His chair, expertly woven from large facing boards, is seen as a whole mass. This heavy, beautifully shaped seat is naturally continued by the prismatic tower. The faces of the tower have been turned into arches by crossing thin profile convex tins on top. The Gulistan mausoleum is a bright example of the transition from a square base to a circle, from a cubic capacity to a conical shape, in terms of artistic and technical solutions. The Gulustan mausoleum consists of a twelve-storey tower built on a solid pedestal. The mausoleum, which is square in structure, is divided into two planes in the second tier. The pedestal is completed by a richly decorated cornice, above which rises the dome. There is a complex and elegant ornament on the planes of the upper part. The top cover of the mausoleum has not reached us. The height of the mausoleum is 9 m. The outer contour of the mausoleum plan is a square with each side equal to 6.60 m.		38°58′16.87″S 45°35′14.99″W
19	Ordubad State Historical-Cultural Reserve	Ordubad	The reserve, located in the historical city of Ordubad, was established by the decision of the Council of Ministers of the Azerbaijan SSR in 1977. More than 600 immovable historical and cultural monuments have been registered in the territory of the reserve. The center of the reserve is considered to be the five central neighborhoods of the city of Ordubad: Ambaras, Kurdetal, Mingis, Sarshaher and Uchturlange. Along all the streets, there are 2-3, and sometimes 4 small squares at different heights depending on the terrain. These squares are located at the junction of 3-4 narrow, strange, crooked streets. Each such square combines a number of elements it serves. This includes the small mosque (neighborhood mosque), the fountain and the plane trees covering the square with their umbrella. The neighborhood mosques located in those squares do not have minarets. The minaret is replaced by a sidewalk on the roof of the mosque. The main highway of the city is an ancient street. This street is still important as a main street and connects the city center with the railway station. The residential buildings that created the general panorama of the city make the city significantly different from other cities of Azerbaijan. The neighborhoods are composed of two-story townhouses and buildings rich in small architectural elements with an octagonal inner courtyard.		38°54′17″S 46°1′23″W
20	Yukhari Bash State Historical-Architectural Reserve and Palace of Shaki Khans	Şəki	It is a historical-architectural reserve that surrounds the ancient historical center of the city of Sheki. The area of the reserve is 283 hectares. Sheki Castle, Sheki Khan's Palace, the house of Sheki Khanovs, mosques, minarets, caravansary, baths, artisans' historical shops, Gileily, Girchi, Slaves, Duluz, Afghans and other historical residences of the city of Sheki are included in the protected area, which was created by the decision of the Council of Ministers of the Azerbaijan SSR in 1968. The Sheki Khan Palace, located inside the Sheki Castle and surrounded by the castle walls, was the summer residence of the Sheki Khans. The palace was built in 1790–1797 by architect Haji Zeynalabdin Shirazi by the order of Mohammadhasan Khan.		41°12′16.07″S 47°11′50.82″W
21	Shusha State Historical and Architectural Reserve	Şuşa	It is a historical-architectural reserve created in 1977 by the decision of the Council of Ministers of the Azerbaijan SSR and covering the historical center of the city of Shusha. The reserve with an area of 400 hectares has 549 ancient buildings (72 of which are residences or house museums of people who left a mark on the history of Azerbaijan), 17 neighborhood springs, 17 mosques, 6 caravansaries, 3 tombs, 2 madrasas, several churches and monasteries, 2 castles. and the castle walls are registered. Most of these monuments were built by the architect Karbalayi Safikhan Karabagi, who lived in the 19th century, and decorated by the most famous painter of that period, Karbalayi Safarali.		39°45′30″S 46°44′54″W

== Literature ==
- Aşurbəyli, Sara Balabəy (2006) [1998 Azərnəşr]. Bakı şəhərinin tarixi: Orta əsrlər dövrü [The History of Baku: the Medieval period] (PDF) (in Azerbaijani). Baku: Avrasiya. ISBN 9789952421675.
- Bretanitsky, Leonid Semenovich (1966). Зодчество Азербайджана XII–XV вв. и его место в архитектуре Переднего Востока [The Architecture of Azerbaijan in the 12th–15th centuries and its Place in the Architecture of the Near East]. Наука.
- Bretanitsky, Leonid Semenovich; Weimarn, B. V. (1976). I. A. Shkirich (ed.). Искусство Азербайджана IV–XVIII веков [The Art of Azerbaijan from the 4th to the 18th century] (in Russian). Moscow: Iskusstvo.
- Leviatov, V. N. (1944). Памятники азербайджанской культуры (Бакинский дворец ширваншахов) [Monuments of Azerbaijani culture (Baku Palace of the Shirvanshahs)] (in Russian). Baku: Academy of Sciences of the USSR (Azerbaijan).
