= Alasgar =

Alasgar may refer to:

- Ələsgər, Azerbaijan, a village
- Alasgar Alakbarov (1910–1963, Soviet actor
- Alasgar bey Mahmudov (fl. 1918), Member of the Azerbaijani National Council
- Shakili Alasgar (1866–1929), Azeri folk musician
- Ashig Alasgar (1821–1926), Azeri troubadour
- Leyla Mammadbeyova (1909–1989), Azeri aviator
- Aygun Kazimova (born 1971), Azeri singer
