= Lekit church =

Former Caucasian Albanian temple in Azerbaijan

Lekit temple
- Lekit circular temple
- Azerbaijani: Ləkit məbədi
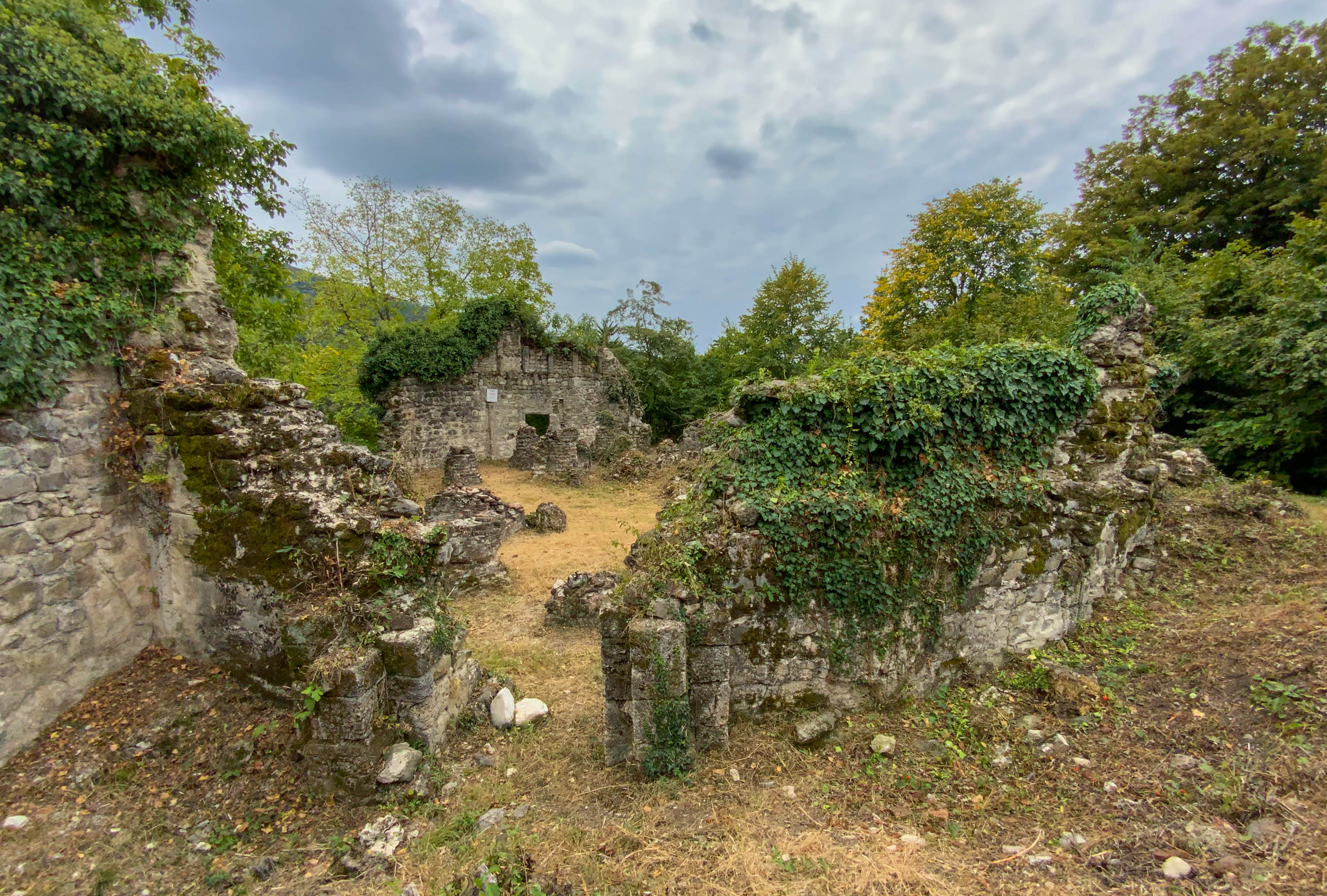
- Ruins of the temple entrance, 2021
- Lekit temple
- 41°29′36″N 46°51′23″E
- Location: Lekit, Qakh District
- Country: Azerbaijan
- Denomination: Church of Caucasian Albania (former)

History
- Status: Temple (former)

Architecture
- Functional status: Abandoned (ruinous state)
- Heritage designation: Architectural Monument of National Importance
- Architectural type: Tetraconch / Circular temple
- Style: Caucasian Albanian architecture
- Completed: 5th–7th century

Specifications
- Materials: Limestone, river cobble

The Lekit temple (Azerbaijani: Ləkit məbədi) is an early medieval Christian temple located 2 km (1.2 mi) northeast of the village of Lekit in the Qakh District of northwestern Azerbaijan. Built between the 5th and 7th centuries AD, it is considered one of the notable surviving examples of Caucasian Albanian religious architecture.

== Overview ==
Architectural historians classify the Lekit temple as a central-plan circular tetraconch, characterized by its inner four-conch arrangement and stone column layout. Excavations led by archaeologist Pyotr Baranovsky in the early 20th century highlighted its structural similarities to other early Christian monuments of Caucasian Albania in the region, such as the Mamrukh and Kilsadagh temples.

== Gallery ==
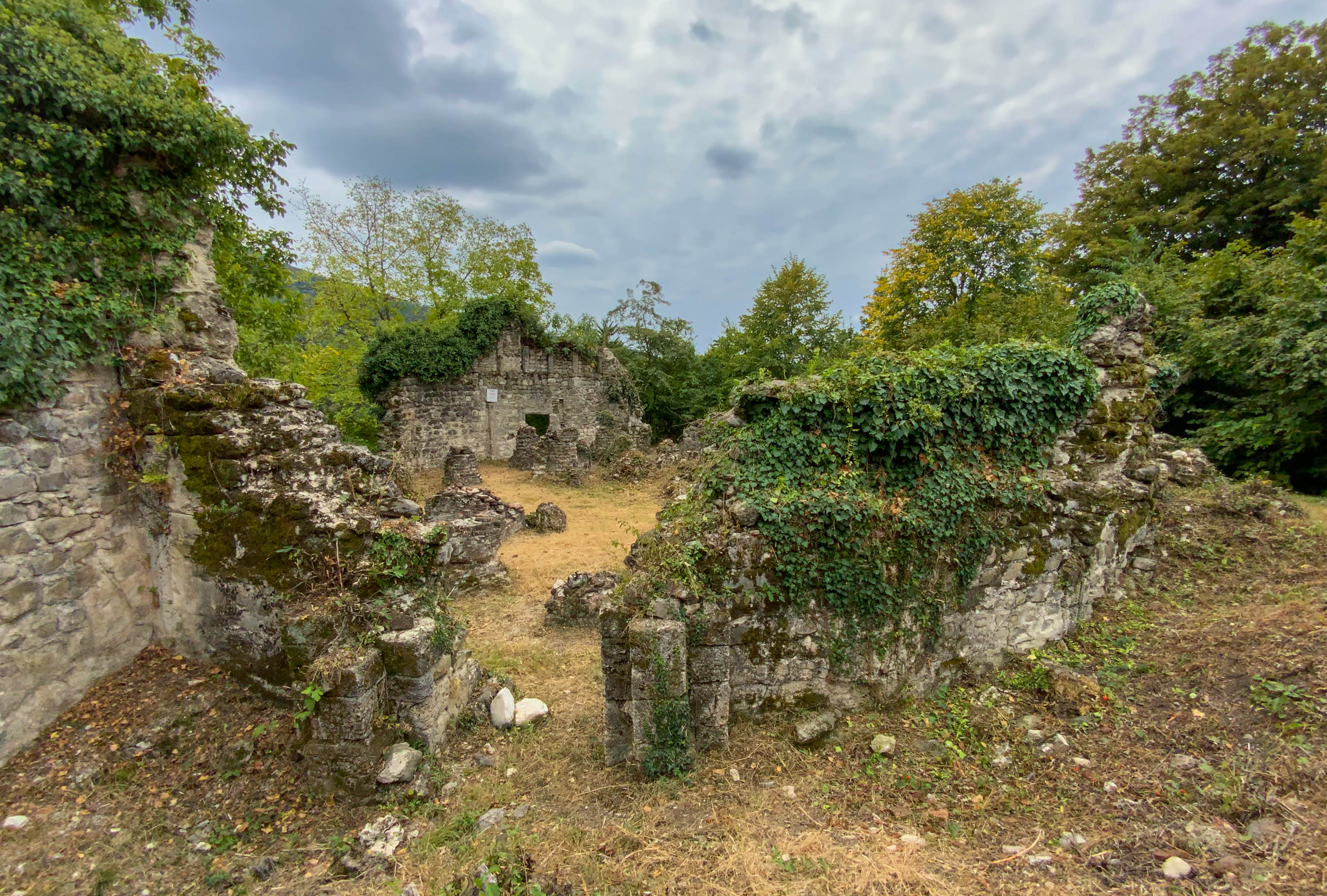
Ruins of the circular temple complex in Lekit

== See also ==
- Church of Caucasian Albania
- Christianity in Azerbaijan
- Church of Kish
- Mamrukh temple
