= Mamrukh temple =

Georgian Orthodox Church located in Zaqatala District

- Azerbaijani: Mamrux məbədi
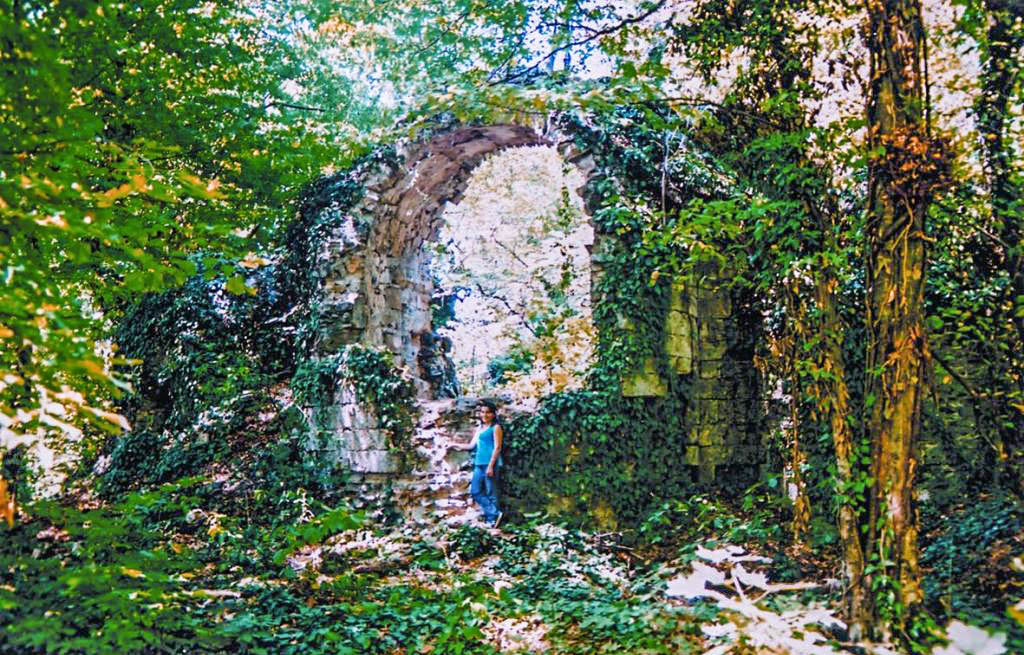

- Location within Azerbaijan

Religion
- Region: Zagatala

Location
- Location: Mamrux, Azerbaijan
- Coordinates: 41°36′12.3″N 46°46′11″E

Mamrukh temple is an ancient Caucasian Albanian church built on the top of Mount Armatay near the villages Gulluk in Gakh district and Mamrukh in Zagatala district of Azerbaijan.

The temple in Mamrukh is considered by specialists to be compositionally related to the rotunda (a building with four equal sides) in Kilsadagh and the tetraconch in the village of Lekit, Gakh district. The altar part of the church, surrounded by small side rooms, has been better preserved. However, the remains of the walls of other parts also rise to a height of at least one meter from the ground, clearly revealing the planning structure of the building.

== History ==
The temple in Mamrukh is considered by experts to be compositionally related to the rotunda (a building with four equal sides) in Kilsadagh and the tetraconch in the village of Lekit, Gakh district.

Specialists studying the planning structure and spatial solution of the temple attribute the date of its construction to the 12-14 centuries.

== Architectural features ==
=== Description ===
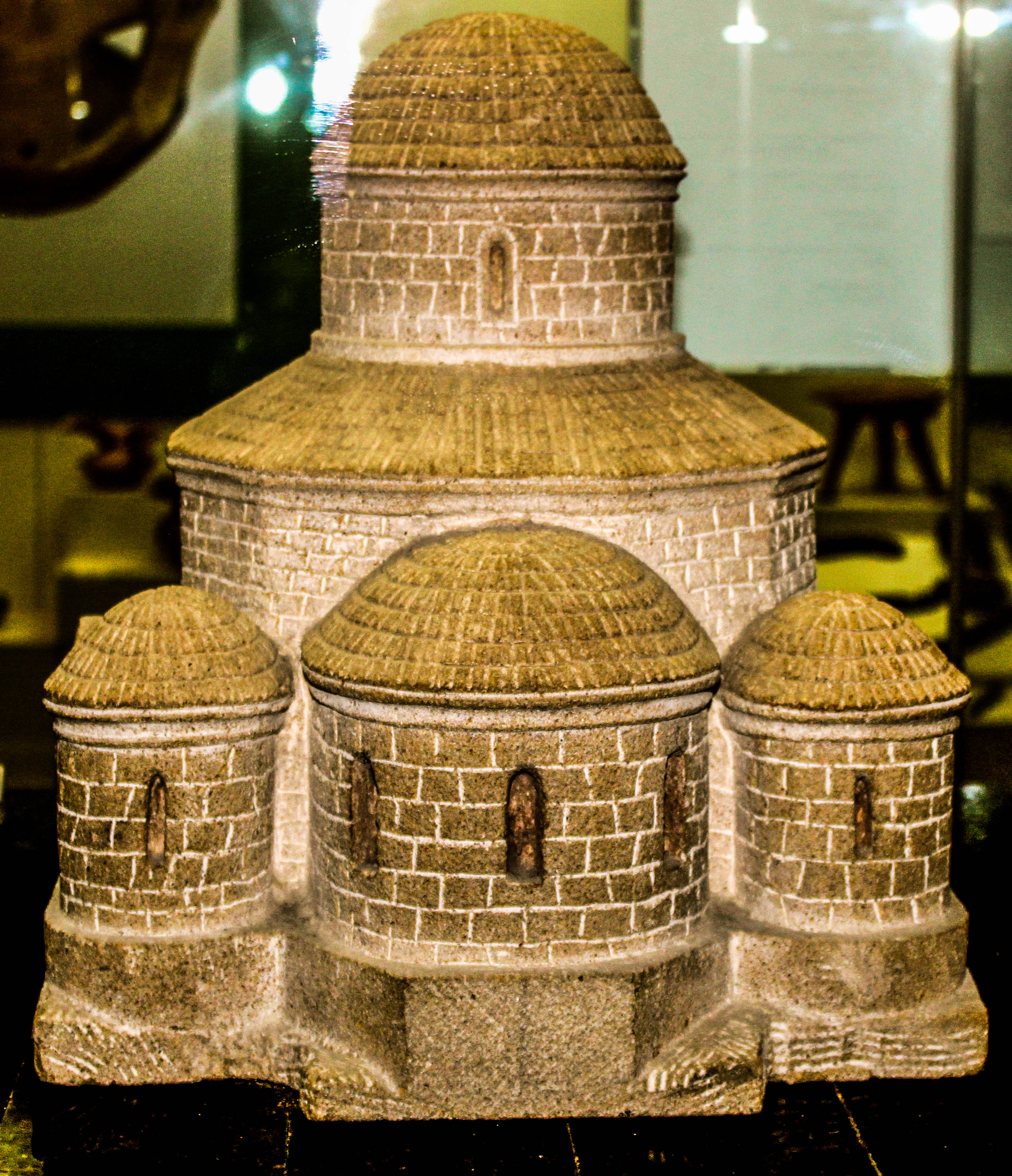
Round church in Mamrukh model in National Museum of History of Azerbaijan

The architectural features of the Mamrukh Church are typical for the central domed buildings of the South Caucasus and the Middle East. Remains of masonry stone walls scattered around the area testify the presence of a large religious complex in the area. From the monastery complex, to nowadays, survived the remains of the temple, of the fortress walls surrounding the complex, and three round turrets-buttresses.

The altar part of the church, surrounded by small side rooms, has been better preserved. However, the remains of the walls of other parts also rise to a height of at least one meter from the ground, clearly revealing the planning structure of the building. To the main round church building, which has entrances from the south, north and west, adjoins the altar part from the eastern side, consisting of a semi-circular apse with a fairly deep bema, and two round aisles, similar to those of Kilsadagh.

The entrances to the temple are designed in the form of deep narrow portals. Unlike the Kilsadagh and Lekit temples, in the Mamrukh temple the recesses between the aisles and the eastern walls of the entrance portals are closed by a wall. Thus, the architect received two additional rooms, which, along with the functional purpose, also carried a purely constructive load, combining two elements adjacent to the main volume into a single support block. G. Mammadova believes that this undoubted desire for compactness and static stability of the structure is dictated by the high seismicity of the territory on which the temple stands.

=== Structural construction ===
The main room, which has an outer diameter of 12.8 meters, is divided by four abutments- pylons into two parts: bypass and domed square. The configuration of the abutments strictly corresponds to their constructive load-bearing functions and is devoid of decor. Two pylon 8 blades perpendicular to each other carried arches forming a domed square. The surface of the third side of the abutment, facing the bypass, exactly follows the shape of the curve of the inner surface of the outer wall. It is much wider (2.3 m) than the other two sides. This repetition in the pylons of the shape of the wall further highlights the idea of a roundabout. The shape of the abutment also suggests the design of the non-preserved ceiling, built, judging by the building remains, of brick. Small semi-circular vaults, connecting the wide vanes of the abutments with the outer wall, apparently divided the entire bypass into eight parts, four of which, the higher ones, were located between the faces of the domed square and the outer wall. Thus, there has been a differentiation of previously equivalent sections of the bypass, in which four towering wings were distinguished, directed along the main mutually perpendicular axes, in the centre of which the dome rises.

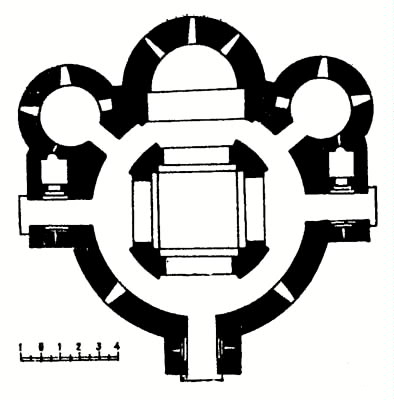
Plan of Mamrukh Church

Round on plan, the chapels of the temple have a diameter of 3.2 m, two windows facing the outside, and one narrow aperture (40 cm) opening into the room at the entrance. Large niches 95 cm deep and 85 cm wide facilitate the mass of masonry between the aisles and the altar.

The abutments of the domed square are directly opposite the doorways of the aisles and make them invisible from the centre of the hall. This emphasizes their secondary "service" purpose, in contrast to the limits of the Kilsadagh temple.

The altar conch lined with shirindash limestone has also been preserved. The walls of the temple were built of cobblestones. Limestone cladding has been preserved in some places on the eastern facade. The pylons are made of rubble-concrete mass and limestone, the remains of the collapsed vaults are brick, brick size is 24x24x5 cm; 23x23x5 cm. The walls inside were plastered and painted. The remains of the painting are preserved on the wall between the altar apse and the northern aisle.

The planning structure of the temple provides its three-tiered spatial composition. The first tier is the altar and entrance groups, the second is the bypass and the third is the drum with a dome. The ceilings of the upper tiers have not been preserved. G. Mammadova notes that there is reason to talk about the vaulted ceiling of the bypass and the domed ceiling of the central square. The transition from the dome to the square base was probably carried out with the help of conch tromps, the most common in the synchronous monuments of the region.

The core of the composition of the Mamrukh temple is a square domed space, which determines the fundamental difference between it and the Kilsadagh temple. Four powerful pylons replaced eight columns, wide arches were thrown from them to the outer walls, which, together with unloading arches and pylons, as well as the outer walls, formed a rigid spatial scheme of the building. The altar, located on the main axis, was clearly visible to those entering through the western door. However, here a certain antagonism appeared between the compositional centre of the round temple, which coincided with the geometric centre of the concentric circles, and its functional centre - the altar apse, the main cult part of the temple. 9 This contradiction was resolved in the Lekit temple by bringing the altar apse as close as possible to the square under the dome and placing it in the end-to-end eastern conch.
