= Mamrux =

- Municipality
- Location within Azerbaijan Location within Shaki-Zagatala Economic Region
- Coordinates: 41°32′40″N 46°46′05″E
- Country: Azerbaijan
- Rayon: Zaqatala

Population
  - Total: 2,150
- Time zone: UTC+4 (AZT)
  - Summer (DST): UTC+5 (AZT)

Mamrux (also, Mamrukh) is a village and municipality in the Zaqatala Rayon of Azerbaijan. It has a population of 2,150. The municipality consists of the villages of Mamrux, Ələsgər, and Cimcimax.

== See also ==
Mamrukh temple
