= Cimcimax =

- Location within Azerbaijan Location within Shaki-Zagatala Economic Region
- Coordinates: 41°35′46″N 46°51′38″E
- Country: Azerbaijan
- District: Zaqatala
- Municipality: Mamrux
- Time zone: UTC+4 (AZT)
  - Summer (DST): UTC+5 (AZT)

Cimcimax (Jimjimakh) is a village in the Zaqatala District of Azerbaijan. The village forms part of the municipality of Mamrux.
