= Kötüklü =

Municipality and village in Qabala Rayon, Azerbaijan

Coordinates: 40°59′N 47°42′E

Kötüklü is a municipality and village in Qabala Rayon, Azerbaijan. It has a population of 609.
