= Bağlıpəyə =

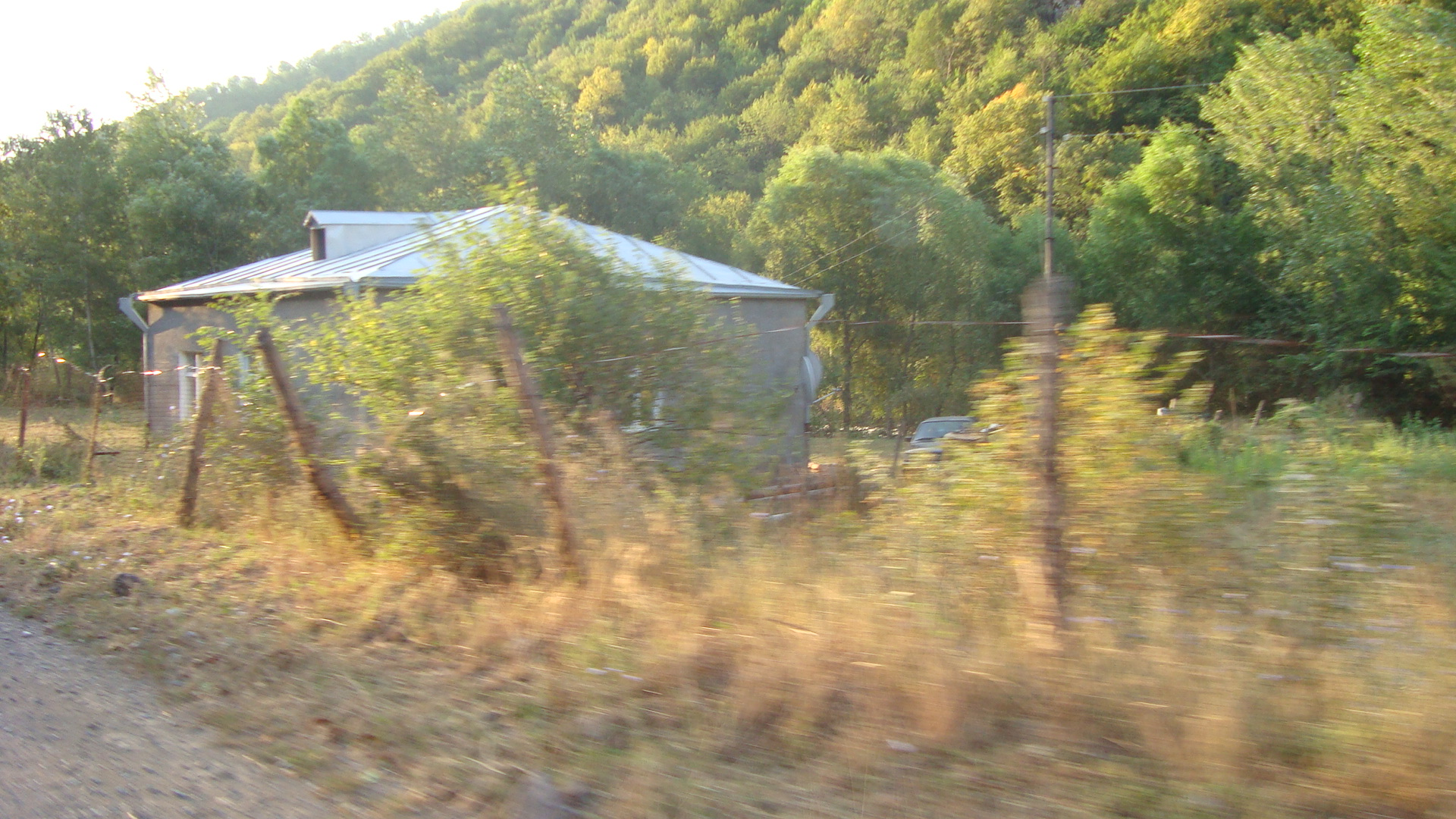

- Location within Azerbaijan Location within East Zangezur Economic Region
- Coordinates: 40°08′46.4″N 46°19′05.0″E
- Country: Azerbaijan
- District: Kalbajar

Population (2015)
  - Total: 159
- Time zone: UTC+4 (AZT)

Bağlıpəyə (Baghlipaya) is a village in the Kalbajar District of Azerbaijan.

== History ==
The village was located in the Armenian-occupied territories surrounding Nagorno-Karabakh, coming under the control of ethnic Armenian forces in 1993 during the First Nagorno-Karabakh War. The village subsequently became part of the breakaway Republic of Artsakh as part of its Shahumyan Province, referred to as Nor Erkej (Armenian: Նոր Էրքեջ). It was returned to Azerbaijan as part of the 2020 Nagorno-Karabakh ceasefire agreement after 2020 Nagorno-Karabakh war.

== Demographics ==
The village had 109 inhabitants in 2005, and 159 inhabitants in 2015.

== Notable people ==
- Isgandar Hamidov — Minister of Internal Affairs of Azerbaijan (1992-1993).

== Gallery ==
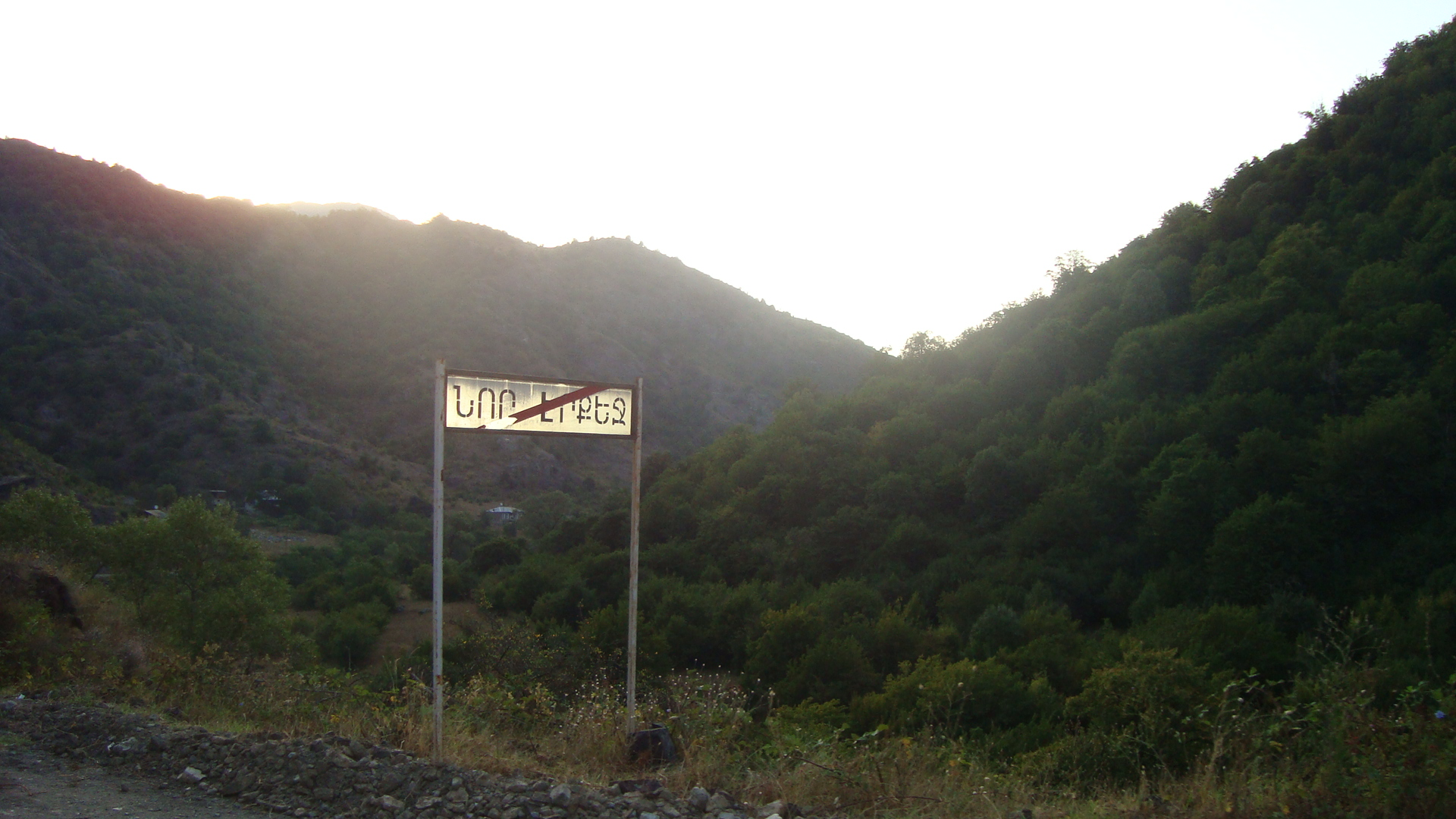
