= Ələsgər =

- Location within Azerbaijan Location within Shaki-Zagatala Economic Region
- Coordinates: 41°34′26″N 46°46′43″E
- Country: Azerbaijan
- Rayon: Zaqatala
- Municipality: Mamrux
- Time zone: UTC+4 (AZT)
  - Summer (DST): UTC+5 (AZT)

Ələsgər (also, Alesker) is a village in the Zaqatala Rayon of Azerbaijan. The village forms part of the municipality of Mamrux.
