= Xaçındərbətli =

- Location within Azerbaijan
- Coordinates: 40°02′24.1″N 46°49′49.9″E
- Country: Azerbaijan
- District: Agdam
- Elevation: 684 m (2,244 ft)
- Time zone: UTC+4 (AZT)

Xaçındərbətli is a village located in Aghdam district of Azerbaijan. The village is home to a memorial architectural monument of medieval Azerbaijan — the Khachindarbatli Mausoleum, which was built in 1314.

== History ==
According to data of 1886, the Azerbaijani (referred in the source as "Tatar") village of Dorbatlu-Khachinlu was part of the Shikhavend rural community in the 3rd area of the Javanshir county of Elizavetpol province.

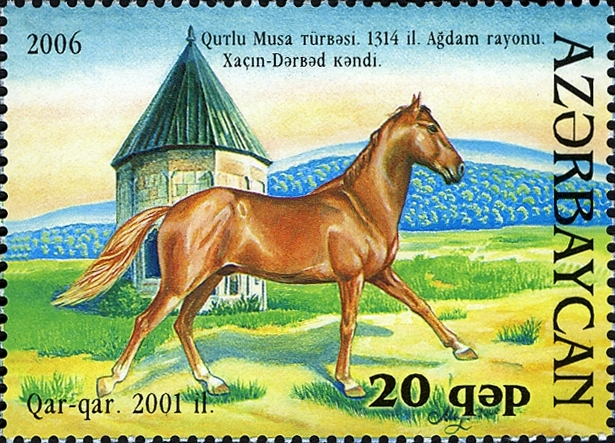
Azerbaijani stamp depicting the village

In the 1960s-1970s, Khachindarbatli was one of the villages of Alimadatli rural council in Aghdam district of Azerbaijan SSR.

During the First Karabakh War in 1993, the village was captured by Armenian armed forces. During this period, many buildings in the region were completely destroyed.

After the end of the Second Karabakh War, a ceasefire agreement was signed under the terms of which the entire territory Aghdam district was returned to Azerbaijan on 20 November 2020.

== Population ==
According to the family lists for 1886, in Dorbatlu-Khachinlu of Shikhavend rural community of the 3rd area of Javanshir district of Elizavetpol province, there were 32 dyms and 232 residents, all Tatars (later known as Azerbaijanis) - Shiites.

According to the results of the Azerbaijani agricultural census of 1921, the villages of Khachin-Dorbatlu and Jinlu-Dorbatlu were part of the Kabarda Boy Akhmedli rural community of Javanshir district of Azerbaijan SSR. The population was 133 people (43 households), the predominant nationality being Azerbaijanis Turks(Azerbaijanis).
