= Khachin-Darbatli Mausoleum =

Coordinates: 40.032993°N 46.817041°E

- Xaçındərbətli türbəsi Խաչեն-Դորբատլիի դամբարանի
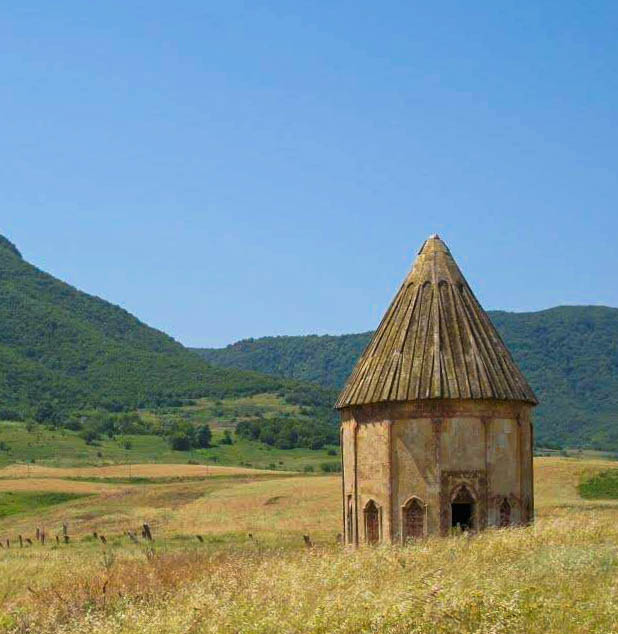
- The mausoleum in 2022
- Interactive map of Khachin-Darbatli Mausoleum
- Location: Agdam District, Azerbaijan
- Designer: Vardapet Shahik
- Type: Mausoleum
- Completion date: 1314
- Dedicated to: Qutlu ibn Musâ

Khachin-Darbatli Mausoleum (Azerbaijani: Xaçındərbətli türbəsi) or Khachen-Dorbatli Mausoleum (Armenian: Խաչեն-Դորբատլիի դամբարանի) is a tomb-mausoleum of Qutlu Khwâdjah (ibn Musâ) located close to the Khachindorbatli village of the Aghdam District of Azerbaijan. It was built by the medieval Armenian architect Vardapet Shahik in 1314. The mausoleum is located 23 km to the north of Aghdam and is on the list of heritage sites of the Republic of Azerbaijan as a 14th-century memorial monument of Karabakh.

The mausoleum, as well as the Agdam district, where the mausoleum is located, was under the occupation of the unrecognized Nagorno-Karabakh Republic since the First Nagorno-Karabakh war until 2020, when the district was returned to Azerbaijan per the 2020 Nagorno-Karabakh ceasefire agreement. In 2023, an investigation by the Caucasus Heritage Watch of Cornell University found that during Armenian control of the area, the mausoleum remained well-preserved.

== Architecture ==
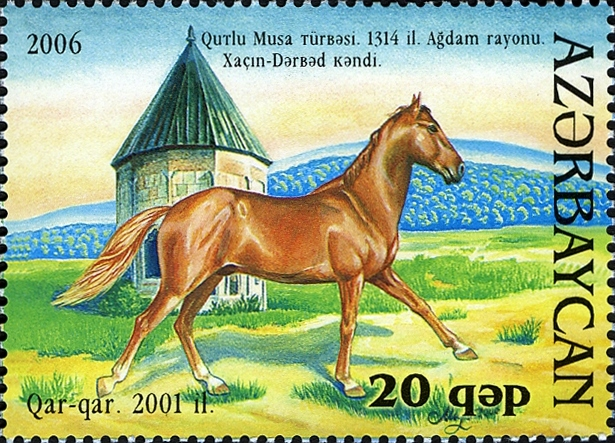
The mausoleum on a 2006 Azerbaijani stamp

Art and architecture historians such as Samvel Karapetyan, Patrick Donabédian, Leonid Bretanitski and Boris Vejmarn note the distinct similarities between this mausoleum and the Armenian Yeghvard Church built thirteen years earlier, as well as, to the exteriors of the Saghmosavank and Geghard monasteries. The structures exhibit mutual influences of Christian and Islamic art, expanding notions about the interconnection of the arts in the Caucasus, Near East, and Anatolian regions. According to architectural researcher Raffi Kortoshian, the inscriptions on both structures demonstrate that they were built by the same Armenian architect, Vardapet Shahik. The name of the Khachin-Darbatli Mausoleum also reveals the Armenian influences. According to Azerbaijani researcher Cavid Aga, the first part of the name incorporates the name of the medieval Armenian Principality of Khachen. Azerbaijani scholar Elchin Aliyev acknowledges the Armenian influences in these mausoleums and cites them as important tools in repairing the cultural relations of the two nations.

The mausoleum is built of yellow limestone and has a dodecahedral (polygonal) body finished with a pyramidal marquee. The internal area of the mausoleum consists of a cross-shaped burial vault and an upper cell featuring heraldic scenes of animals such as bulls and tigers, cut into the niches in low relief. Stalactitical branches of the cross adjoin a multitier stalactitical arch of the cell. A mihrab, which surrounds a chain of small, ornamented rosettes, is located in a shell-like multifoil conch in the southern end arch of the mausoleum.

The strictness of the arch's interior is underlined by filigree ligature of the ornament of the biggest rosette located opposite the entry. The Arabic ligature on the aperture of the upper cell reads:

“Hadha al-‘imârat al-marhum Qutlu Khwâdjah ibn Musâ al-muhtâj alâ rahmat-allah li-‘âlâ Fi târikh rabi’ al-âkhir sana arba’ ‘ashar sab’amia ‘amal ustâd shâhik (This is the building of the late Qutlu Khwâdjah [ibn Musâ] needing the mercy of God the Most High. On the date [of the month] Rabi’ al-âkhir of the year seven hundred and fourteen /15 July-13 August 1314. Work of master Shâhik).”
