= Chirag Gala =

Ruined fortress in Azerbaijan

Coordinates: 41°04′49″N 48°56′43″E

- Azerbaijani: Çıraqqala
- Shabran District in Azerbaijan
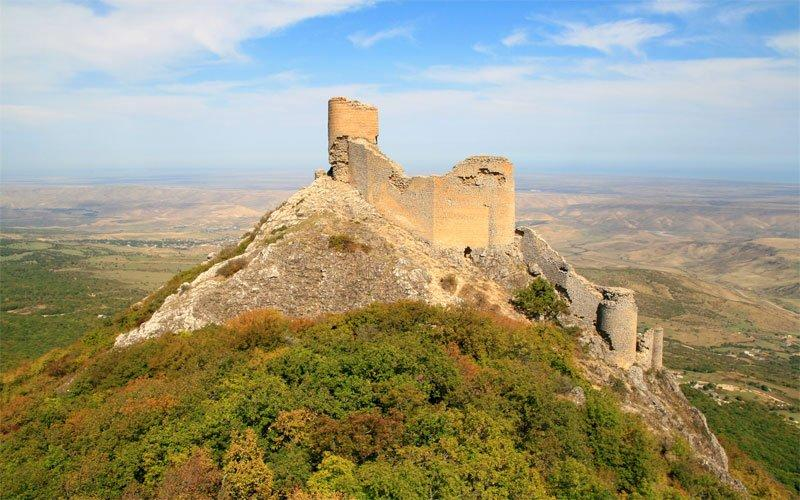
- General view

Site history
- Built: 5th century

Chirag Gala (Azerbaijani: Çıraqqala), also spelled Çiraq Qala or Çirax Qala, which means lamp castle in Azerbaijani is a ruined ancient fortress overlooking the Caspian coastal plains north of Baku in Azerbaijan. It is located on the top of a mountain, in the Guba Forest. It was constructed by the Sassanids in the 5th century, it was used as a defense for the khanate of Quba in the 18th century.

Today the Chirag Gala is a historic site and is frequently visited by tourists. Because of the large rocks and rough road, the Chirag Gala is almost impossible to reach with any vehicle. Most tourists and people travel by foot to the top of the mountain.

== History ==
Chirag gala was built in 4–5th century AD and its function is stated as a lookout post. The location allows to easily warn if sudden enemy invasion occurs by lighting the torches. That is why it is called "Chirag Gala" which means "lamp fortress". Chirag gala was part of the Gilgichay defensive system, which also included Baku and Derbent fortresses. Chirag gala has stopped its defensive functions in the 18th century. In the middle of the 20th century, the fortress was partially renovated.

== Building plan ==
One of the main advantages of Chirag gala is the terrain. Fortress has a form of an irregular rectangle. In the north east of fortress deep cliffs adjoin the main complex.

The fortress consists of 17 towers—1 big and 16 small towers. The towers allow the observation of the surroundings for a few tens kilometers.

== Gallery ==
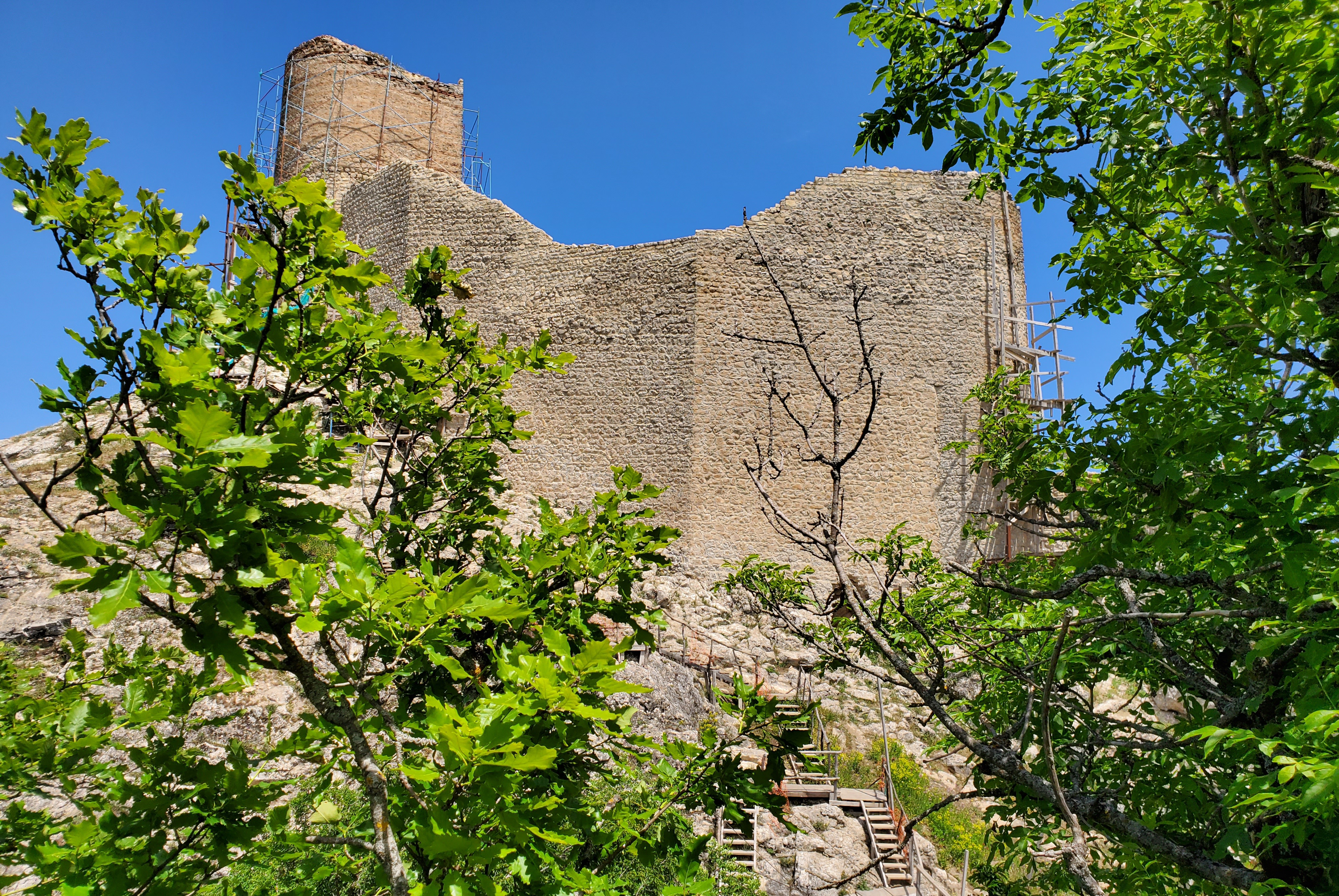

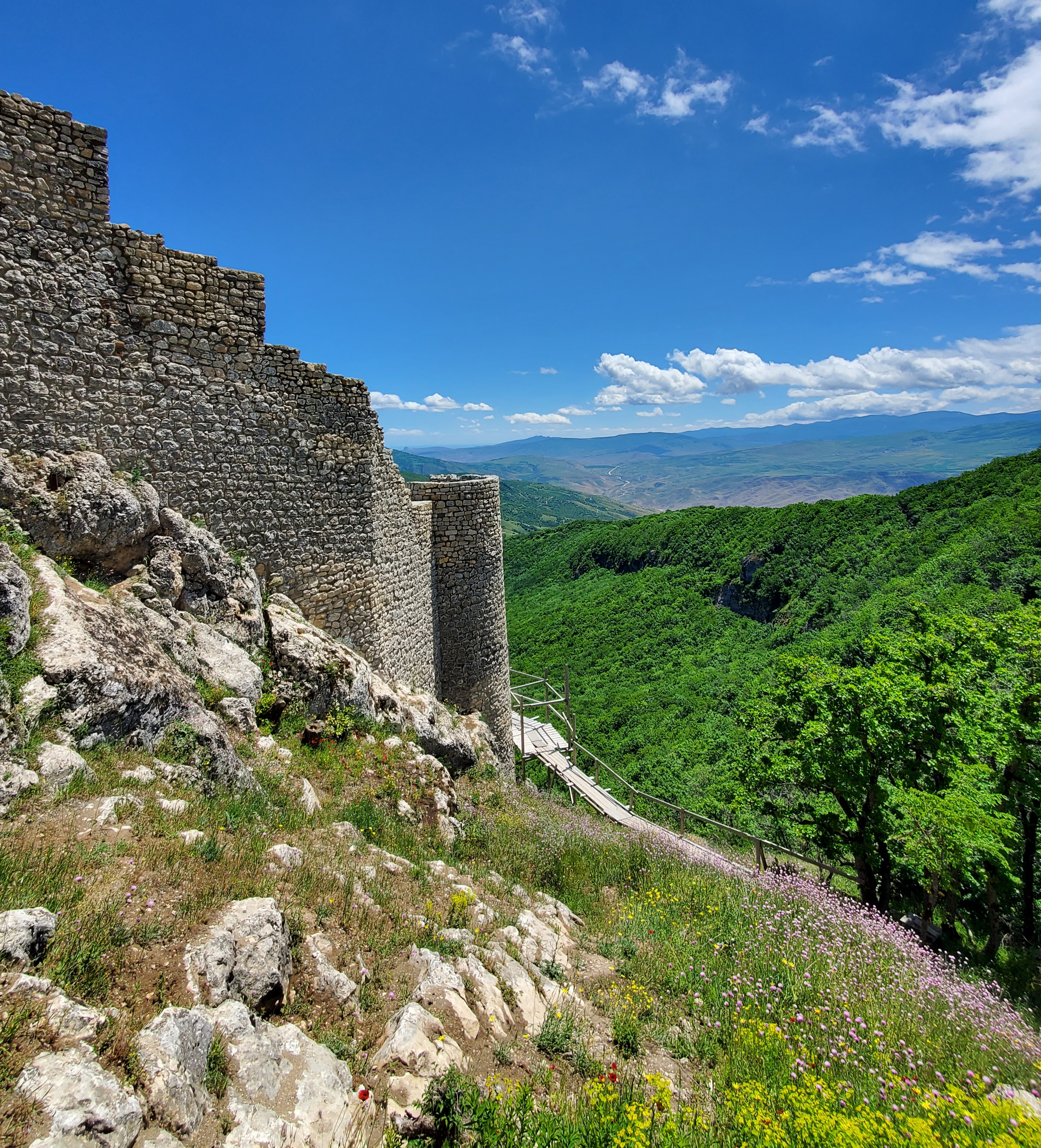

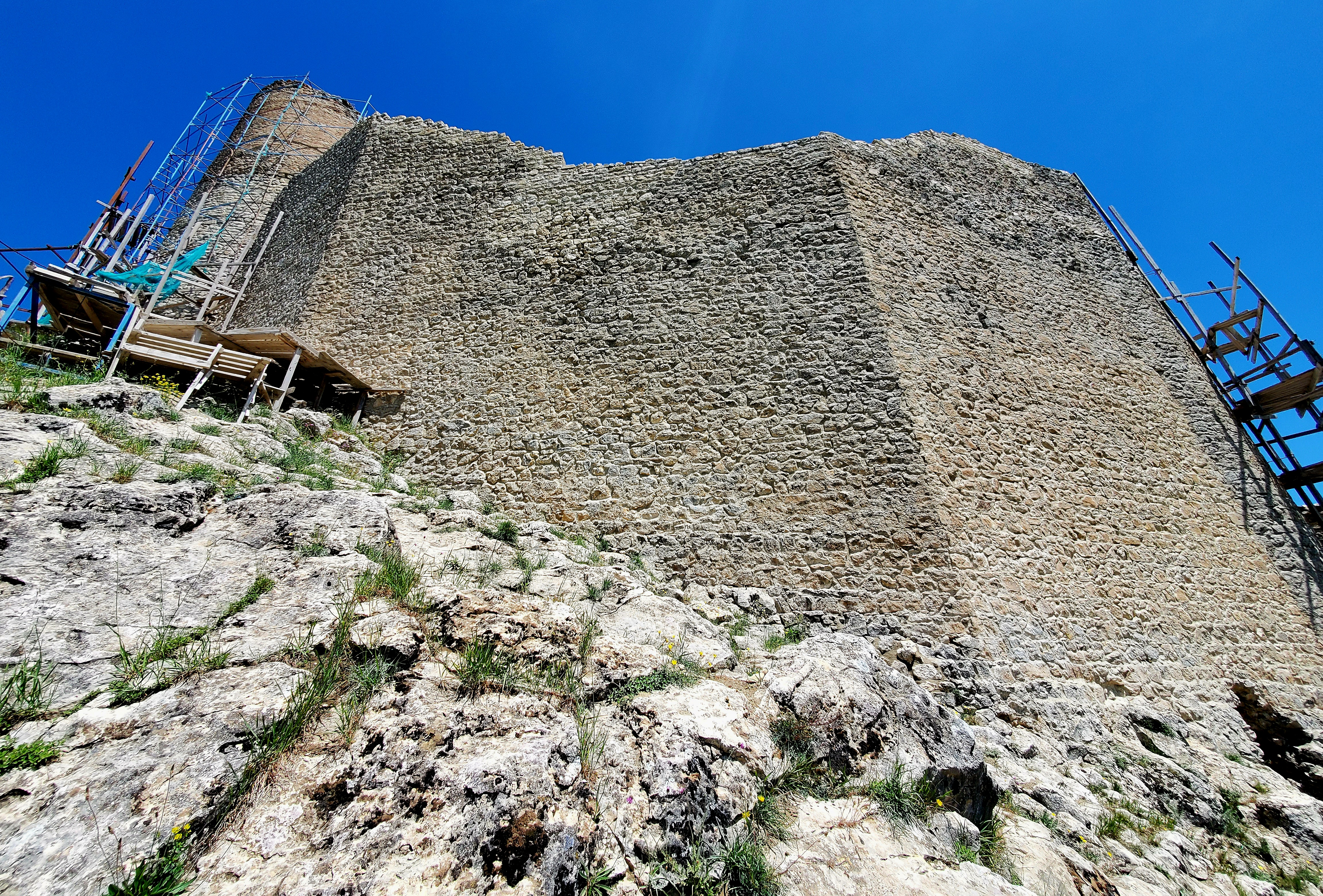

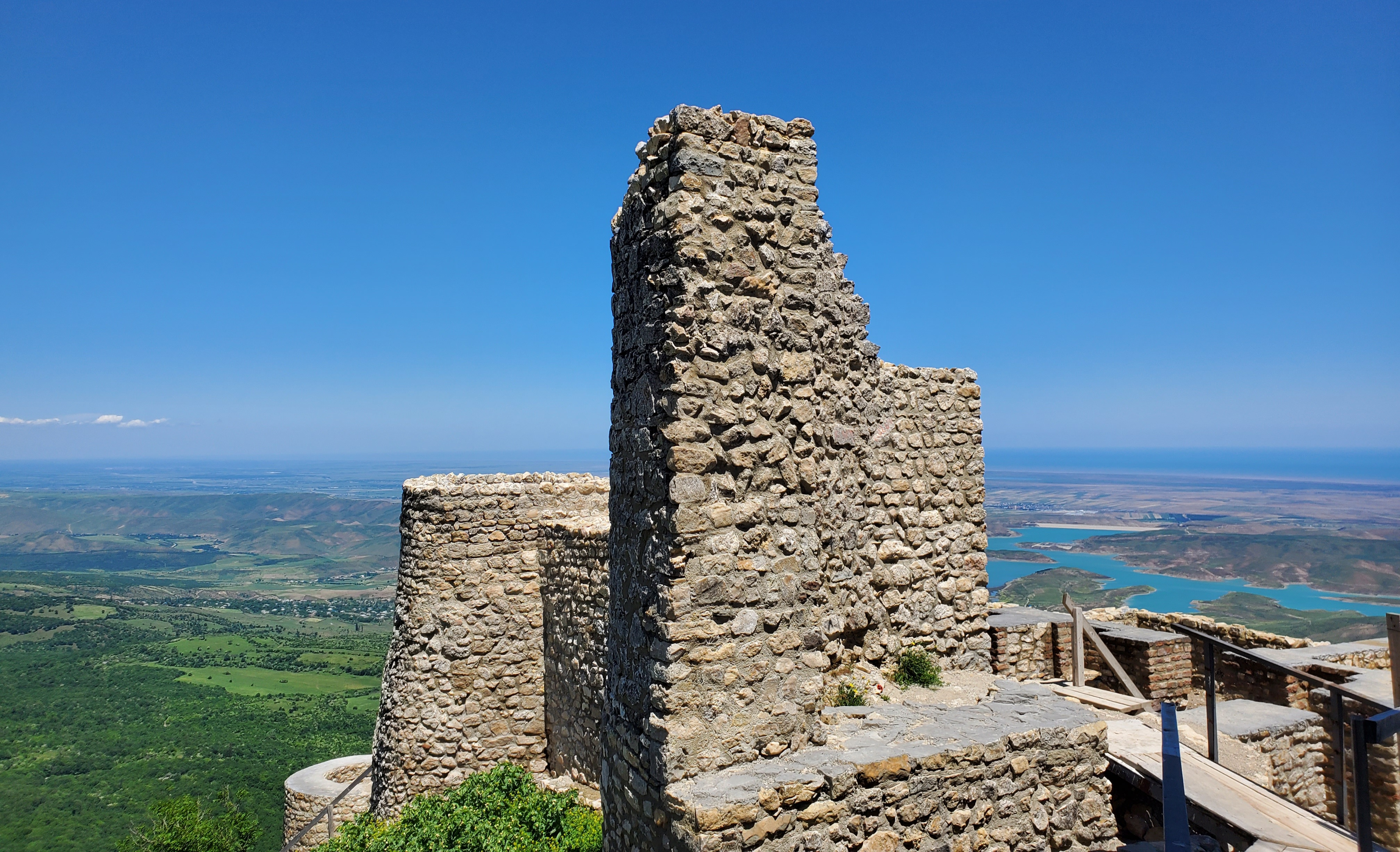

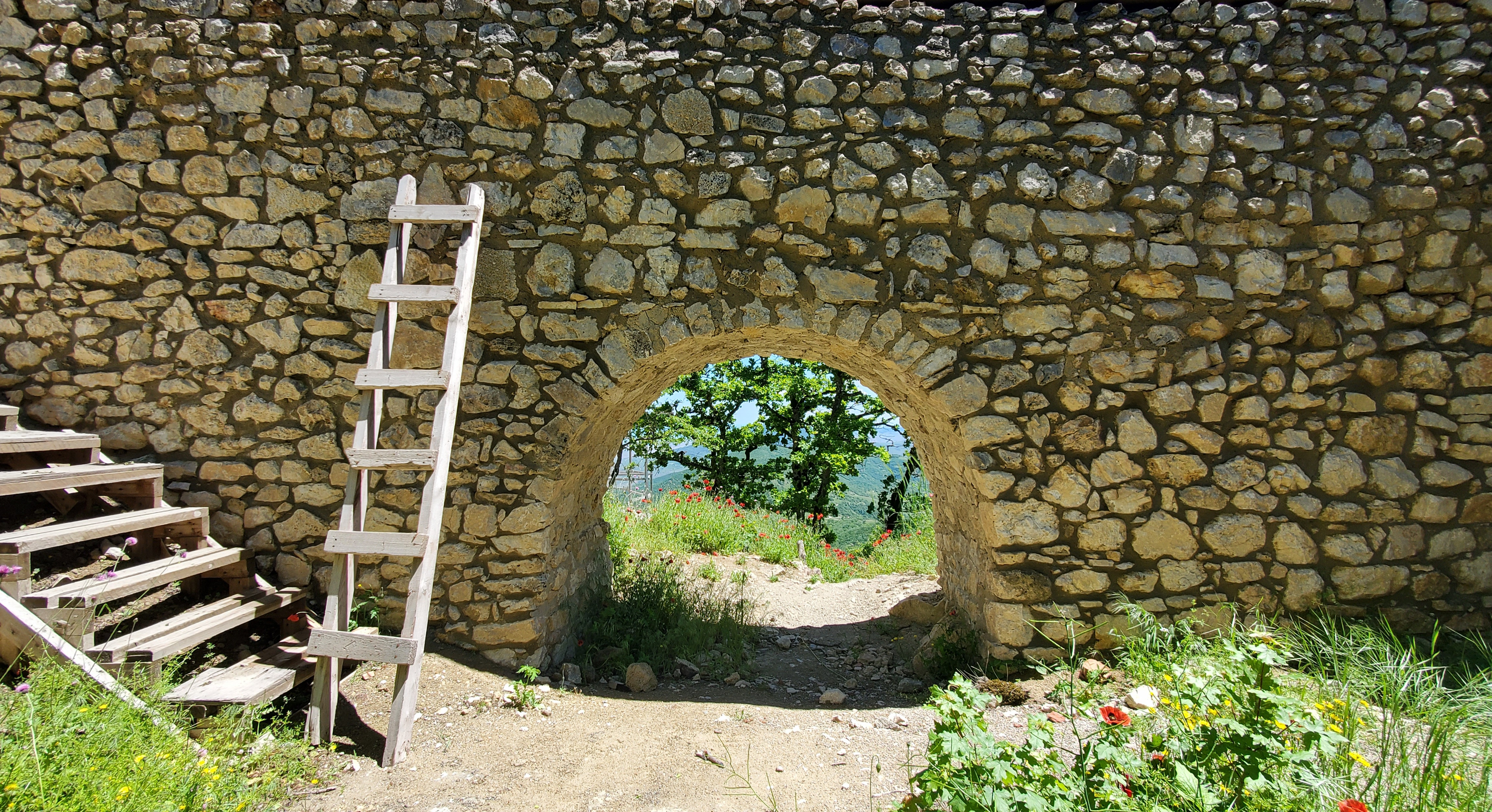

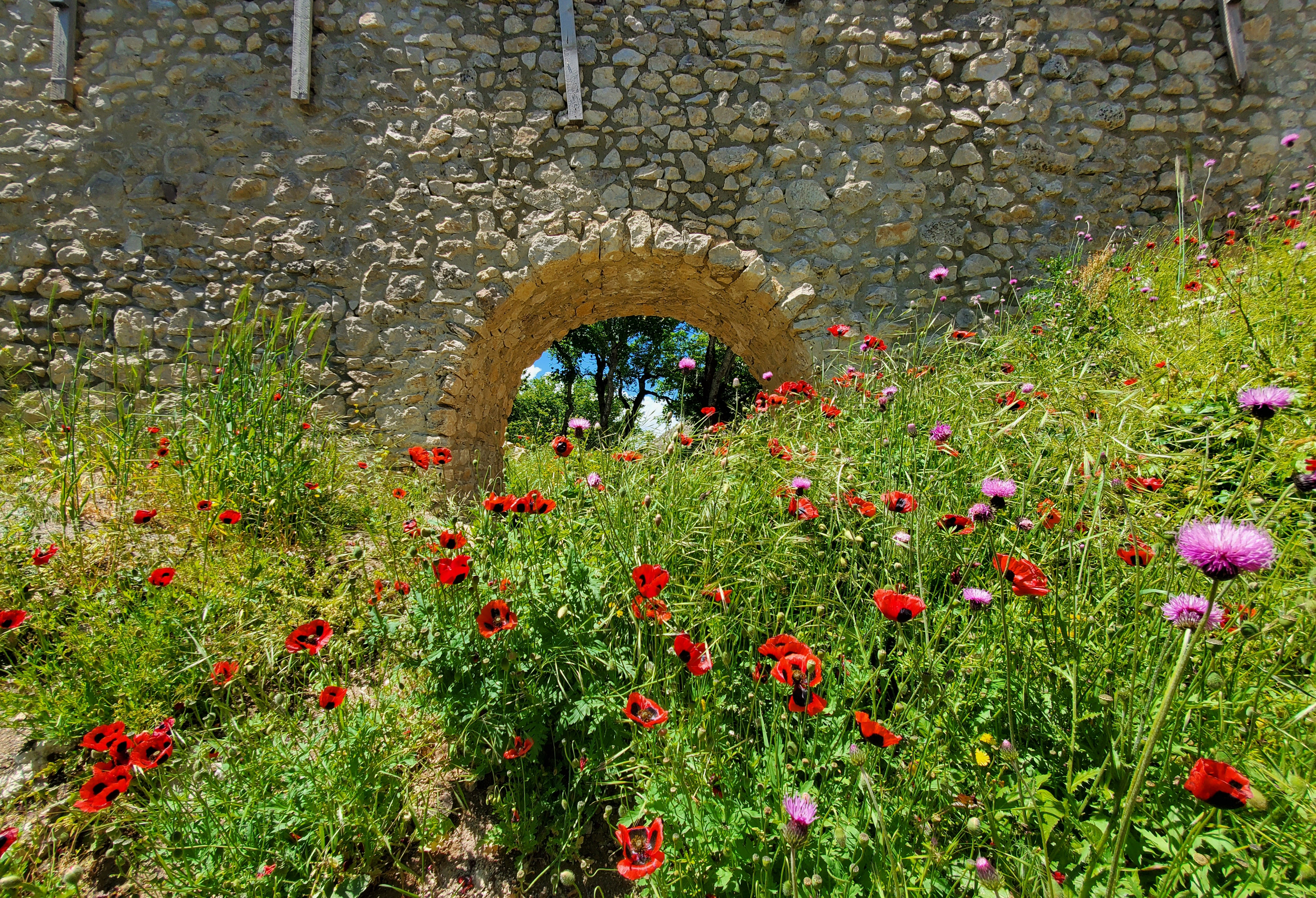

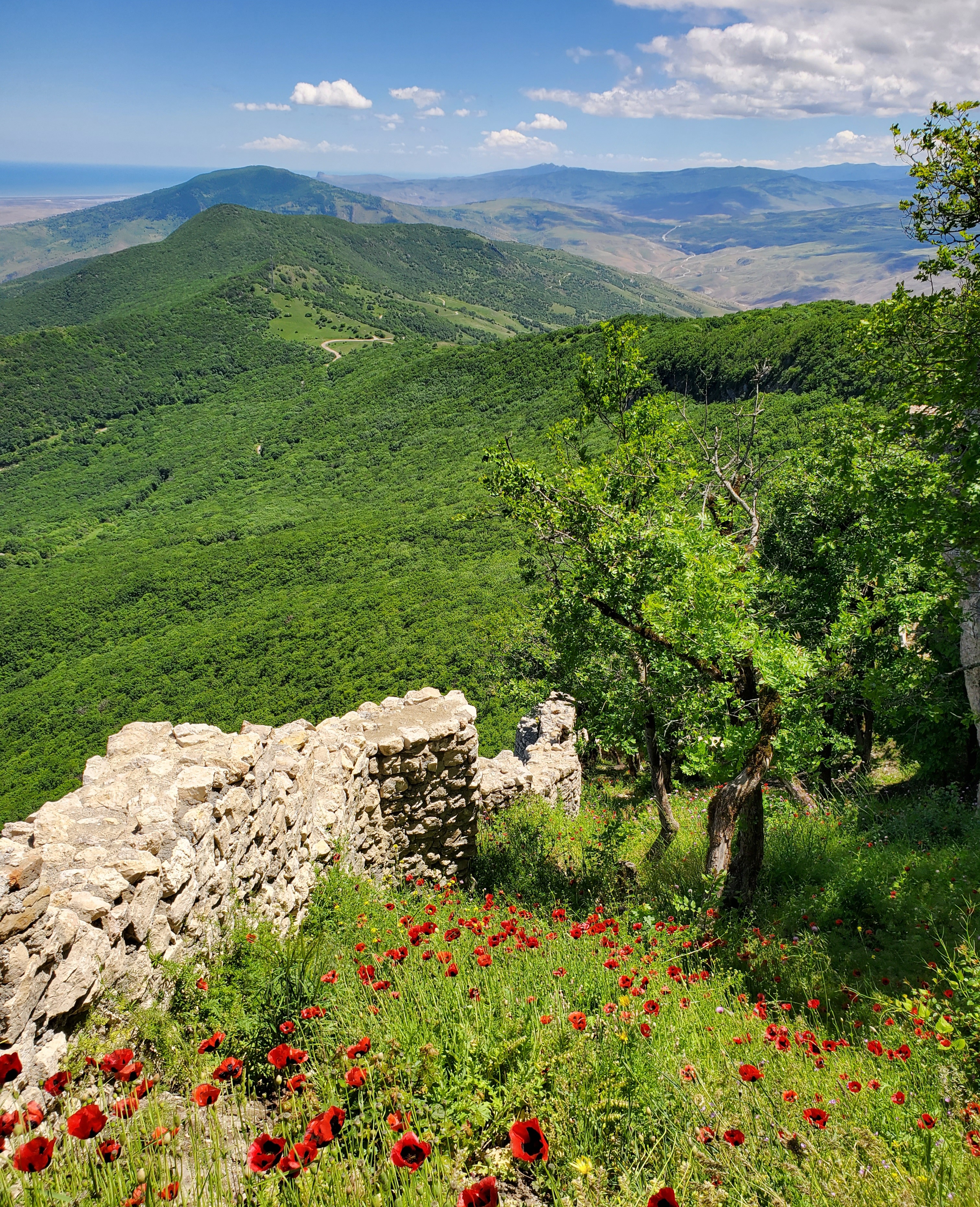

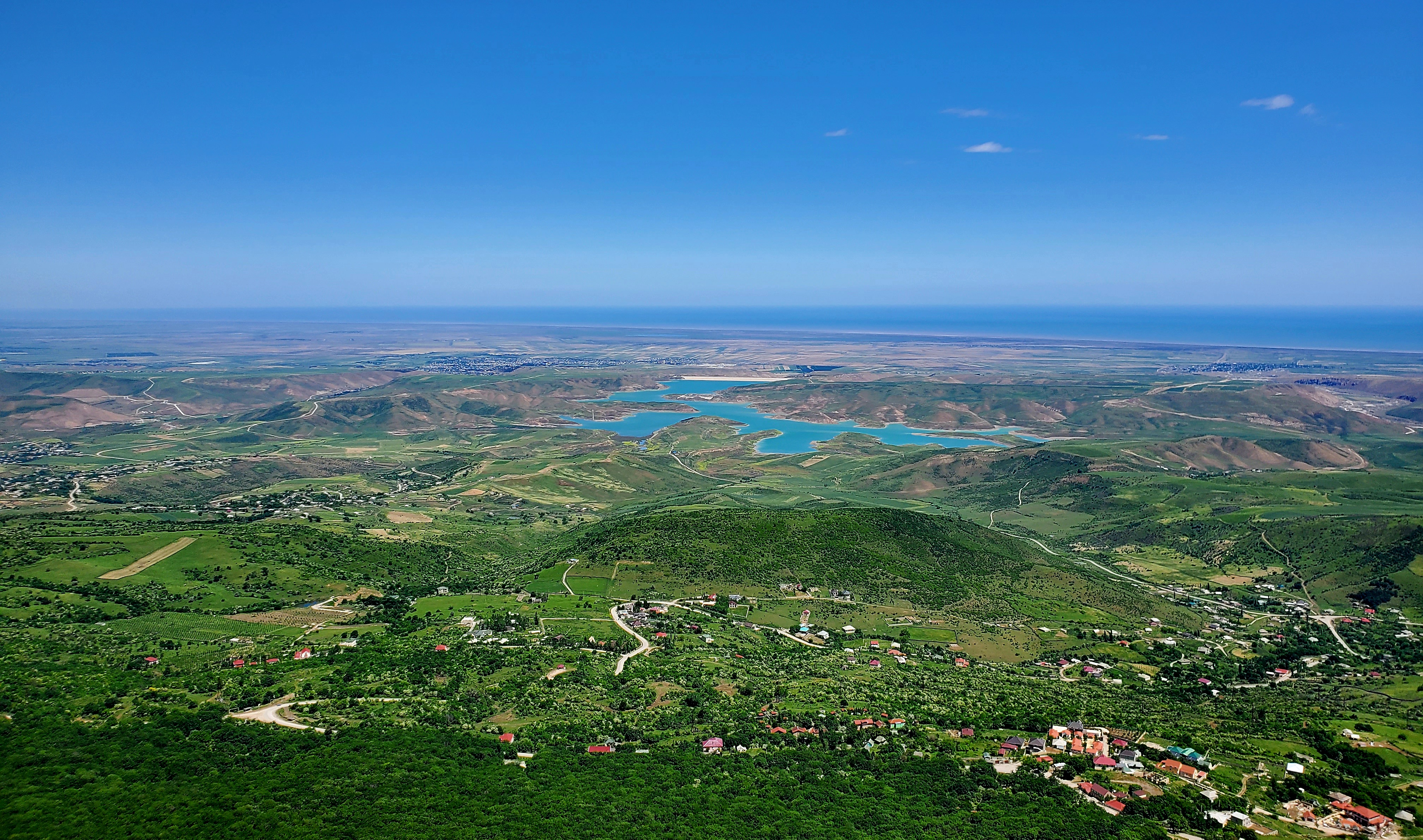
