= Palatial mosque in Baku =

Mosque in Baku, Azerbaijan

Palatial mosque in Baku (Palace Mosque)
- Persian: مسجد کاخ; Azerbaijani: Şah Məscidi; Arabic: مسجد شاه (باكو)
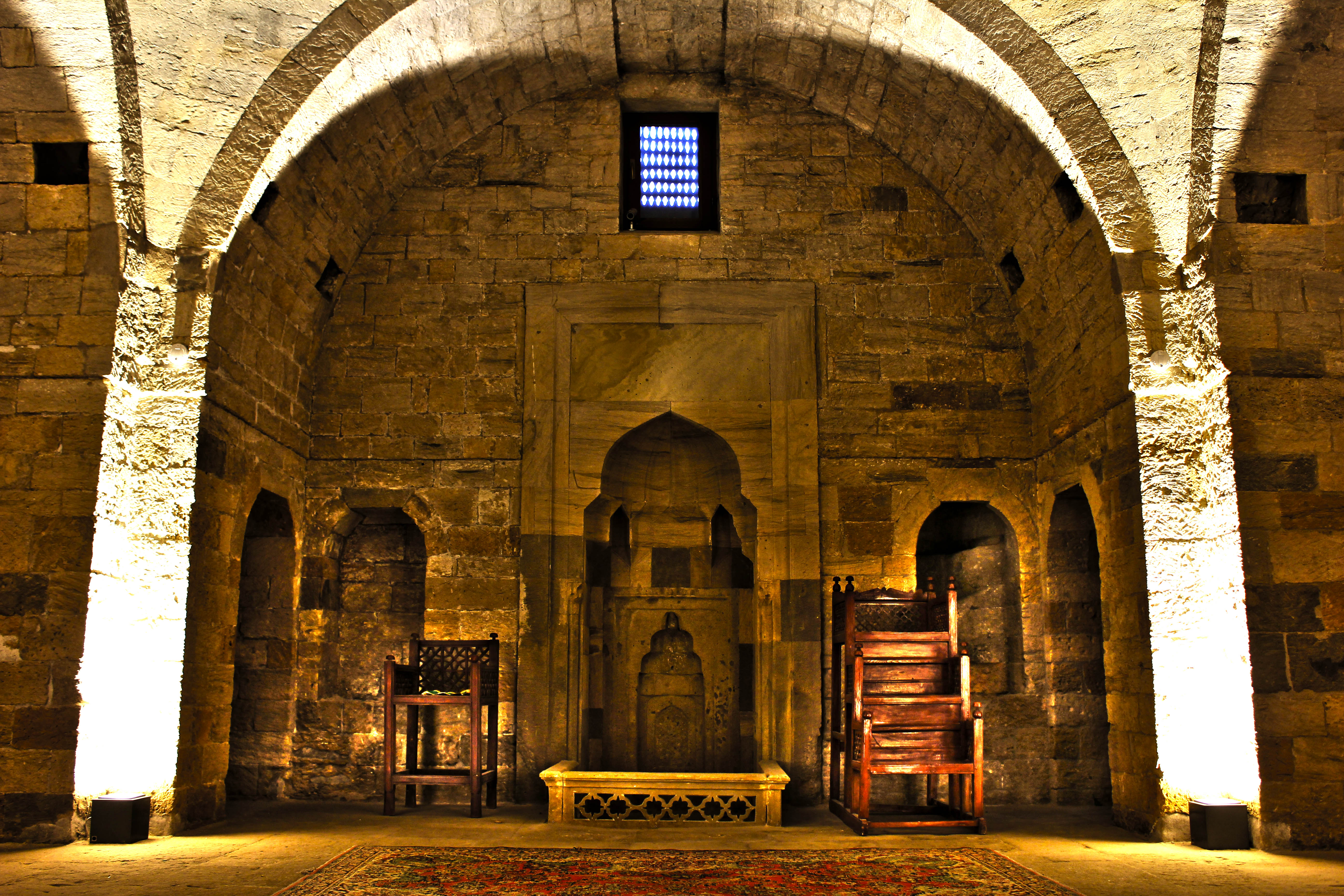
- The interior of the mosque in 2011

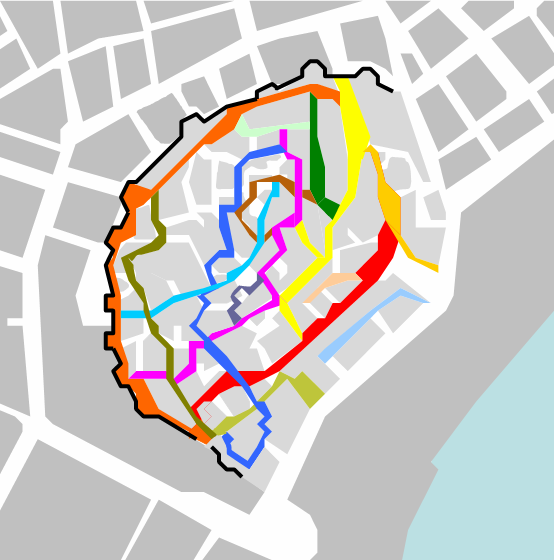
- Location in the Baku Old City

Religion
- Affiliation: Islam
- Ecclesiastical or organizational status: Mosque
- Status: Active

Location
- Location: Palace of the Shirvanshahs, Old City, Baku
- Country: Azerbaijan
- Interactive map of Palatial mosque in Baku (Palace Mosque)
- Coordinates: 40°21′58″N 49°50′00″E

Architecture
- Type: Mosque architecture
- Style: Islamic
- Completed: 845 AH (1441/1442 CE)

Specifications
- Dome: Two (maybe more)
- Minaret: One
- Materials: Stone

UNESCO World Heritage Site
- Official name: Palatial mosque in Baku
- Type: Cultural
- Criteria: iv
- Designated: 2000 (24th session)
- Part of: Walled City of Baku with the Shirvanshah's Palace and Maiden Tower
- Reference no.: 958
- Region: Europe/Asia
- Endangered: 2003–2009

The Palatial mosque in Baku (Persian: مسجد قصر; Azerbaijani: Saray məscidi), also known as the Palace Mosque (Persian: مسجد کاخ; Azerbaijani: Şah Məscidi; Arabic: مسجد شاه (باكو)), and Shirvanshahs Palace Mosque, is a mosque, located inside the Palace of the Shirvanshahs complex, in the Old City of Baku, Azerbaijan. The mosque was built in 845 AH (1441/1442 CE) by the Iranian Shirvanshahs.

The Palatial mosque in Baku forms part of the UNESCO World Heritage-listed Palace of the Shirvanshahs.

== Architecture ==
The plan of the mosque is rectangular. There is a small hall, a small prayer room for women, and serving rooms. The northern portal, turned towards a burial vault of Shirvanshahs, is more solemn than the eastern one. The latter, which came down to an underground exit, was intended for the inhabitants of the palace.

=== Interior ===
The two tier windowed prayer room is covered with a cupola with spherical sails. The mihrab is located in the southern end of the palace. Cupola area over one a tier women's prayer room, ceding to cupola of the hall with its dimensions and replacing its outlines. The aperture of the mosque's portal is clearly described on a severe background of prismatic volume, ended with two cupolas with slightly sharpening calottes.

=== Minaret ===
The trunk of the minaret is surrounded by an inscription, a ligature of which has a date of 845 AH (1441/1442 CE). Details of sherefe's stalactites are subtly modelled.

== Gallery ==
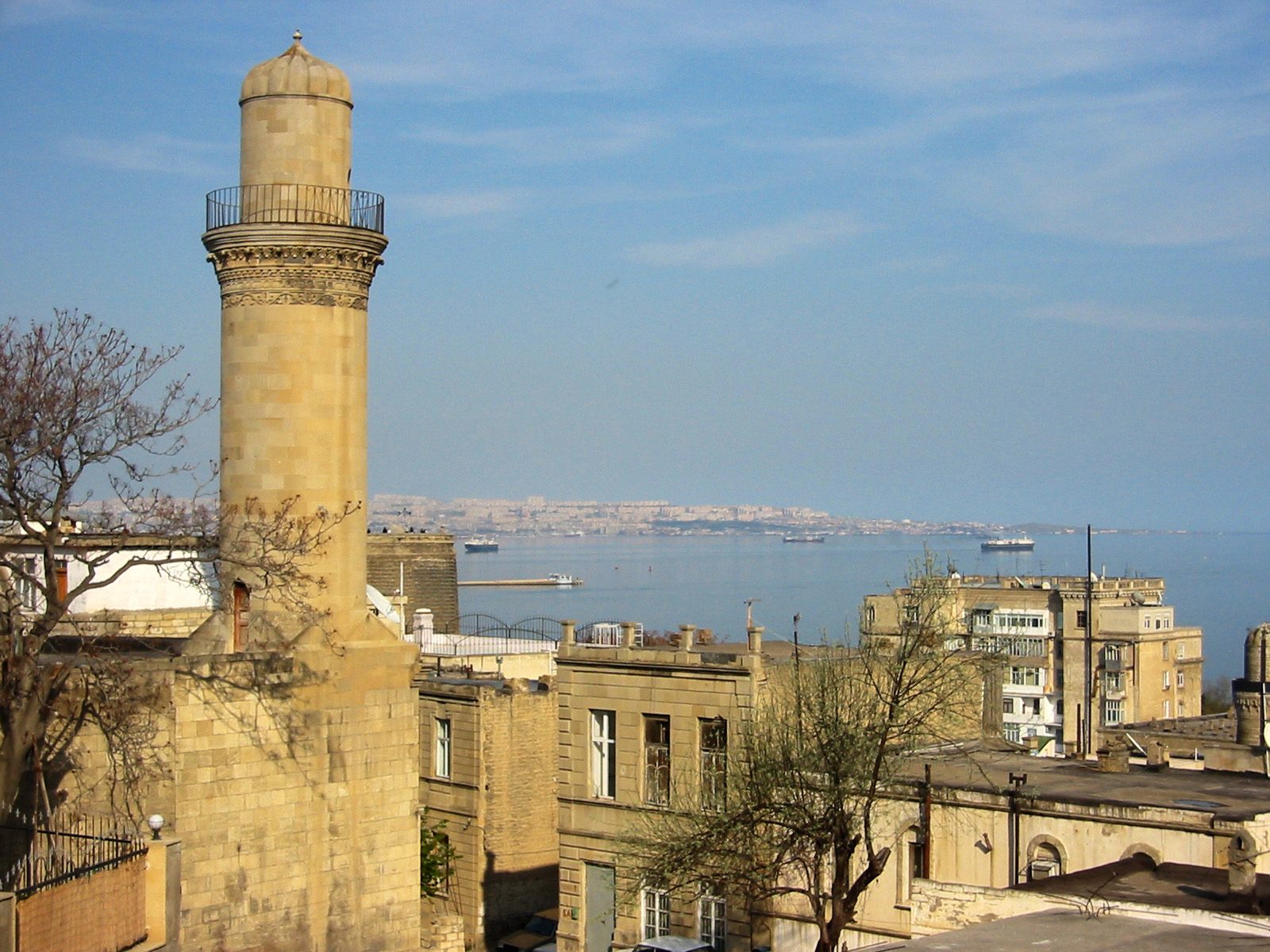

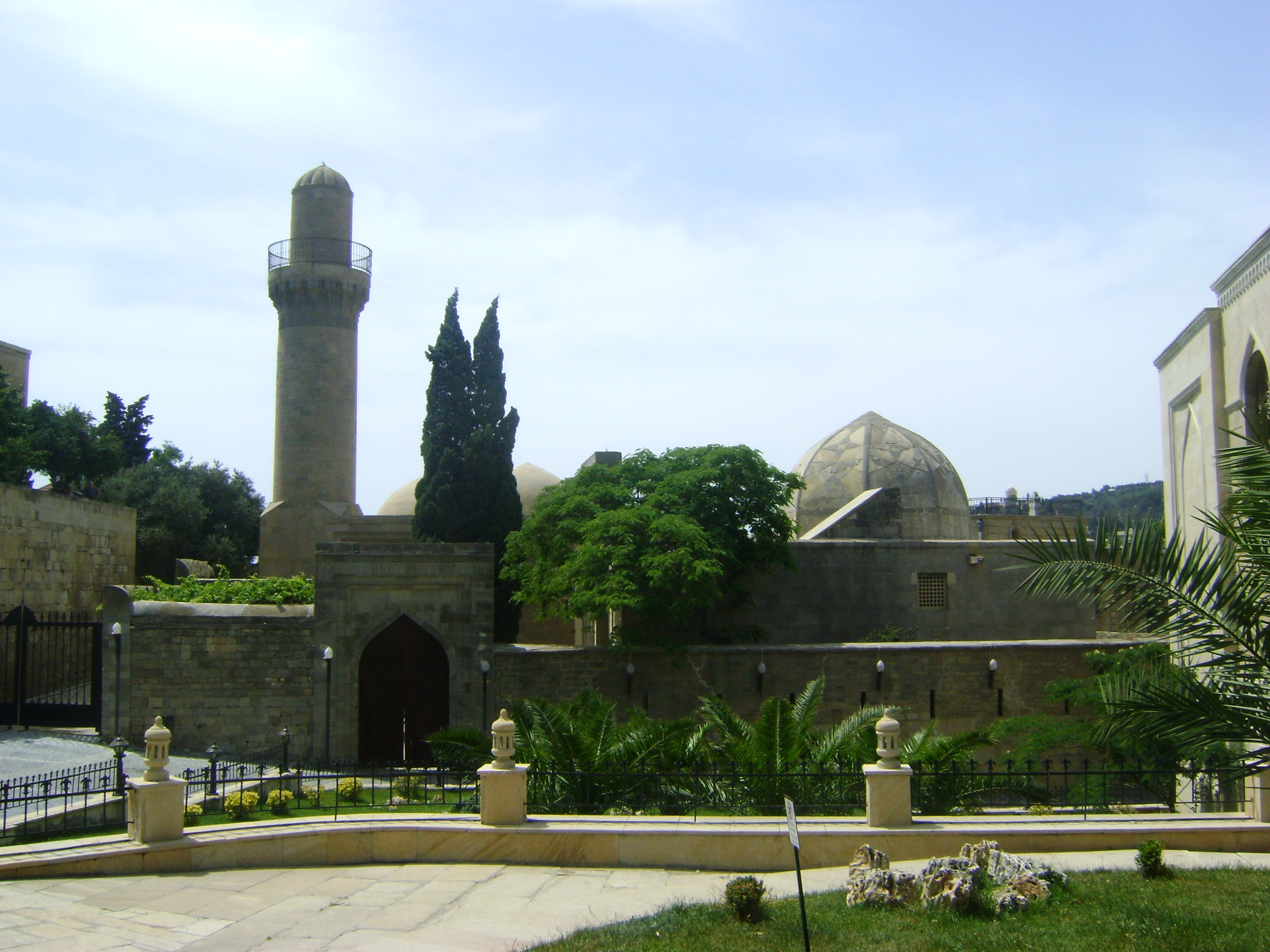

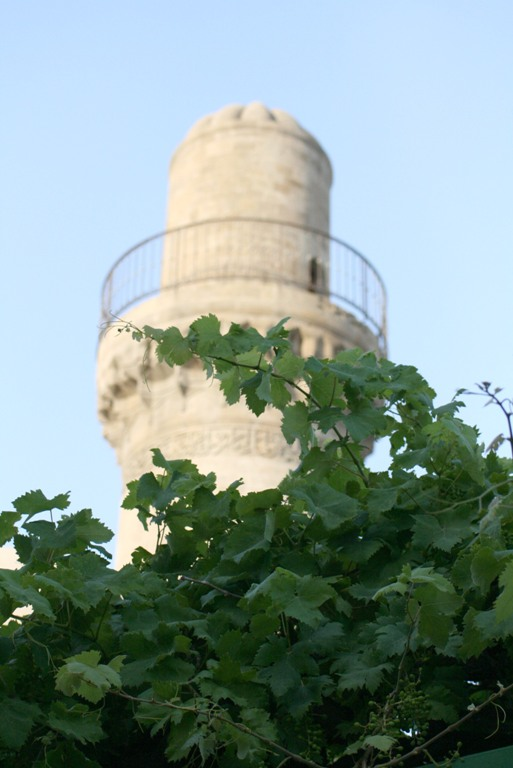

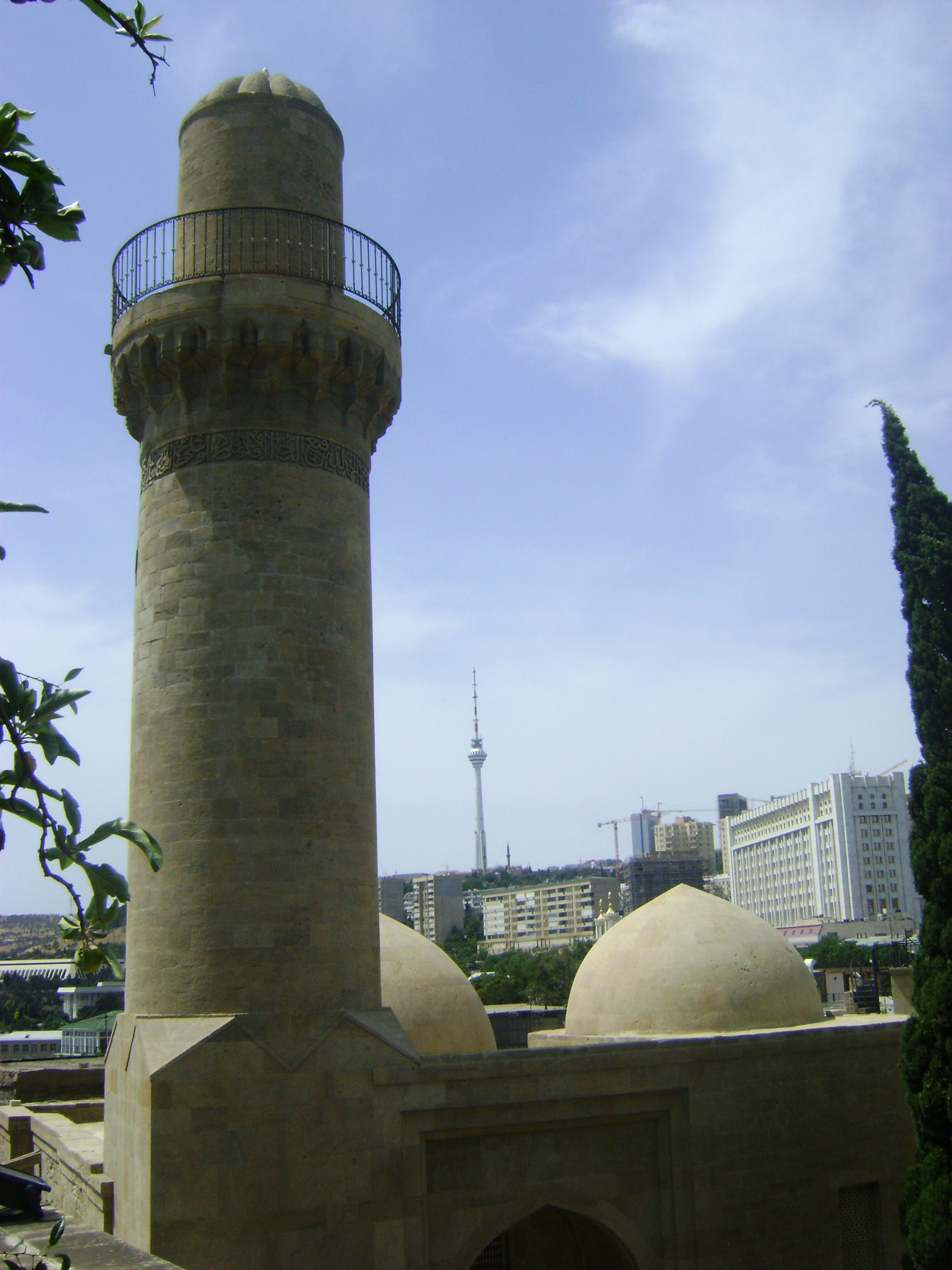

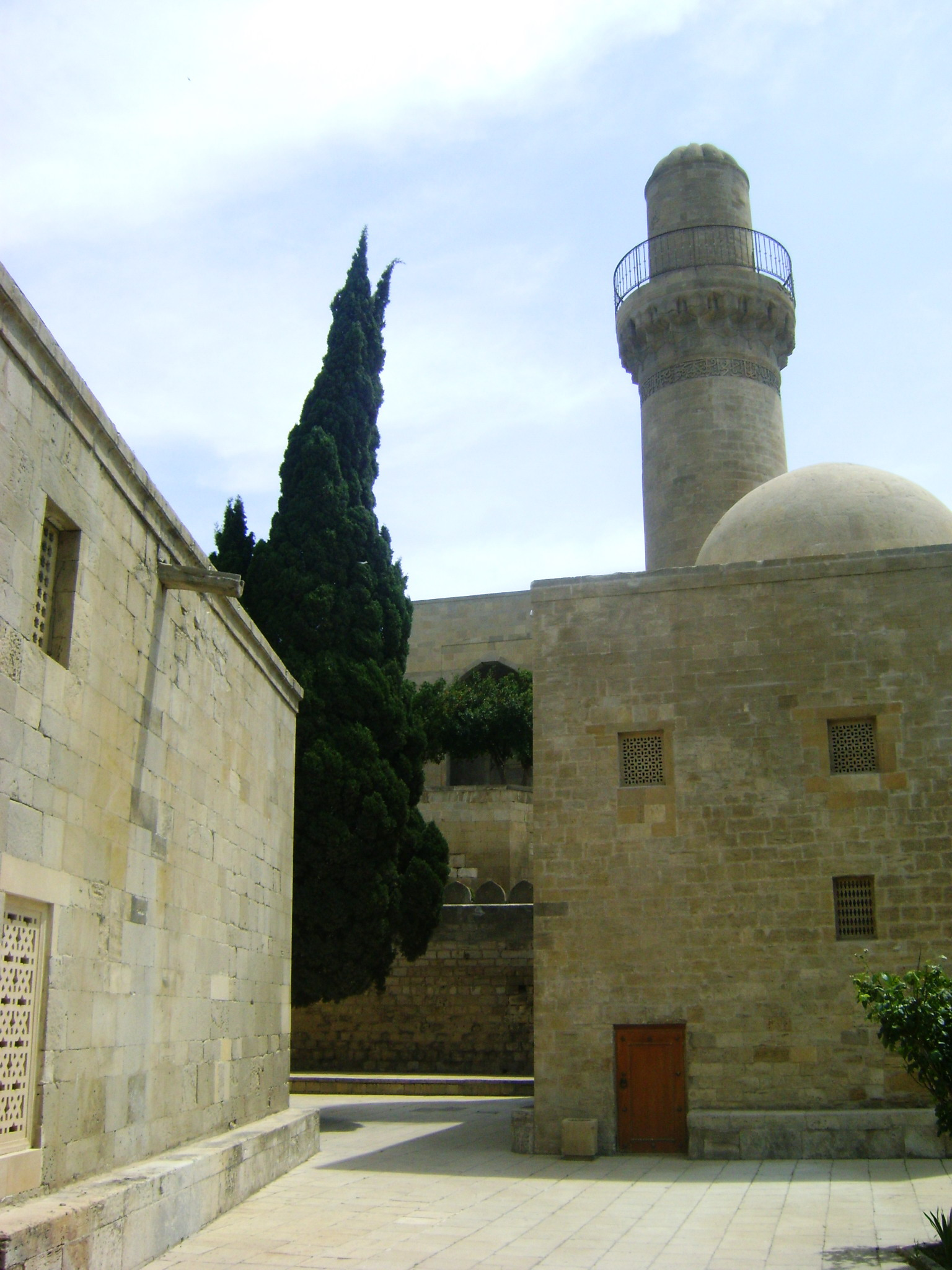

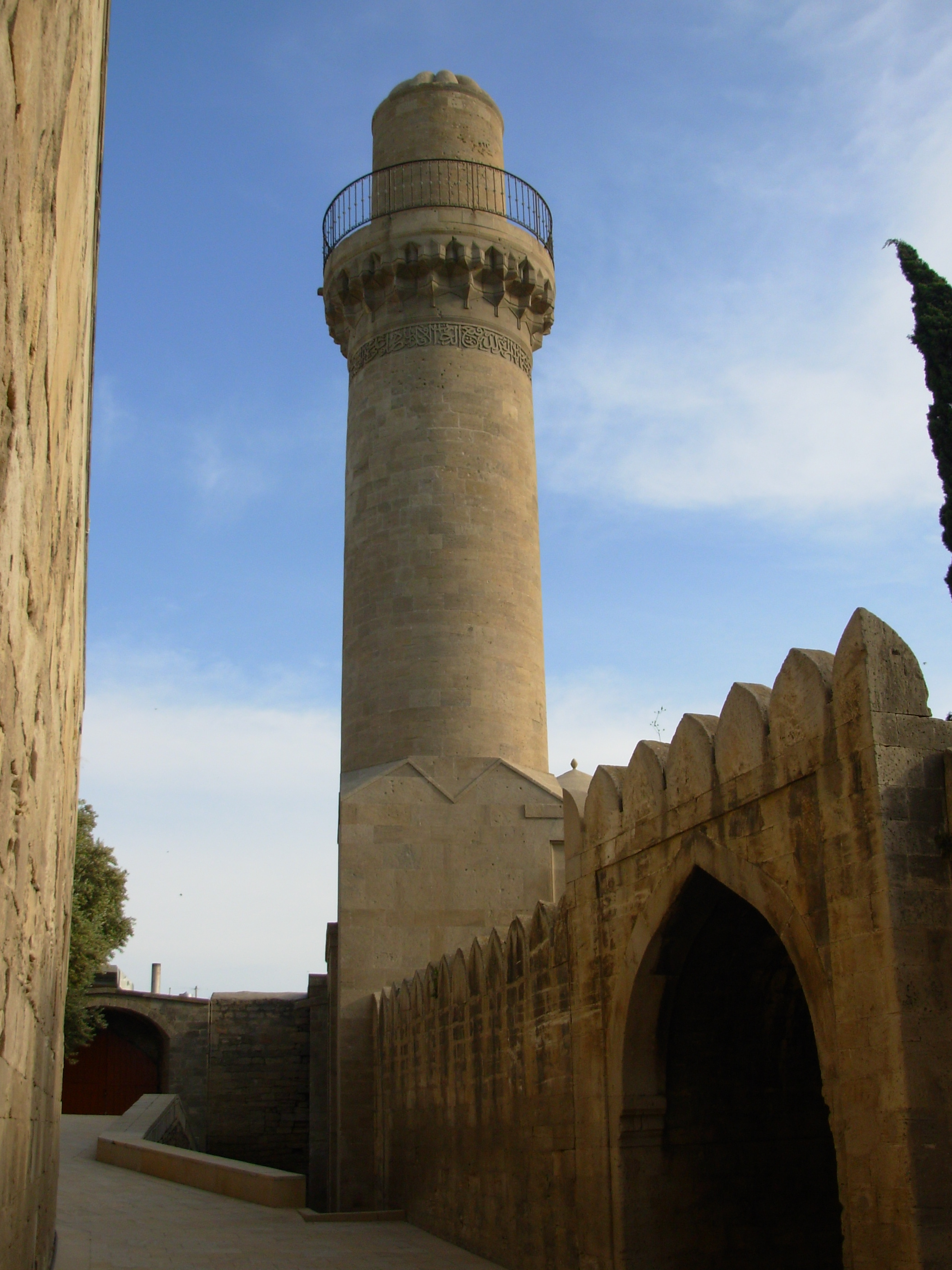

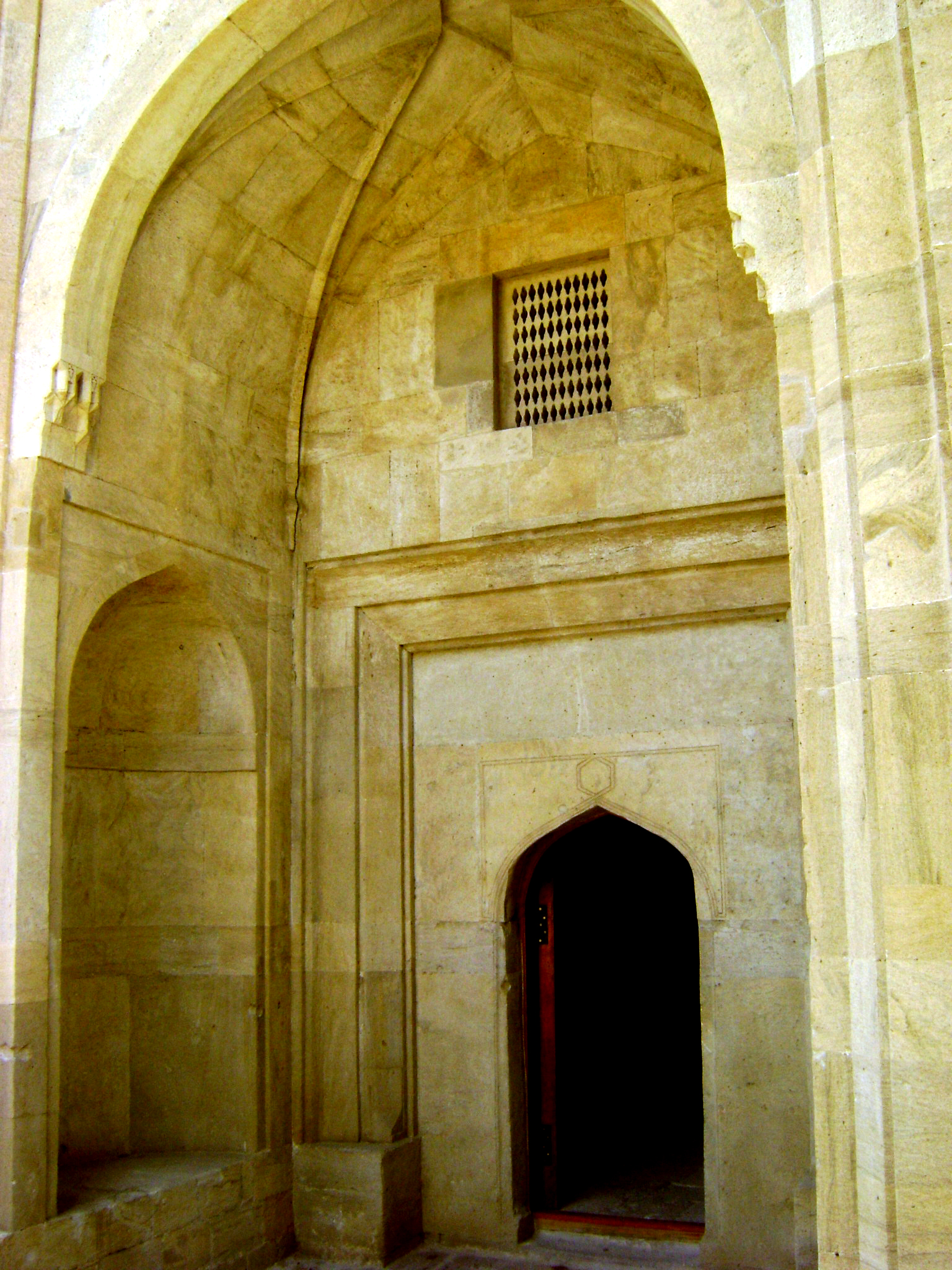

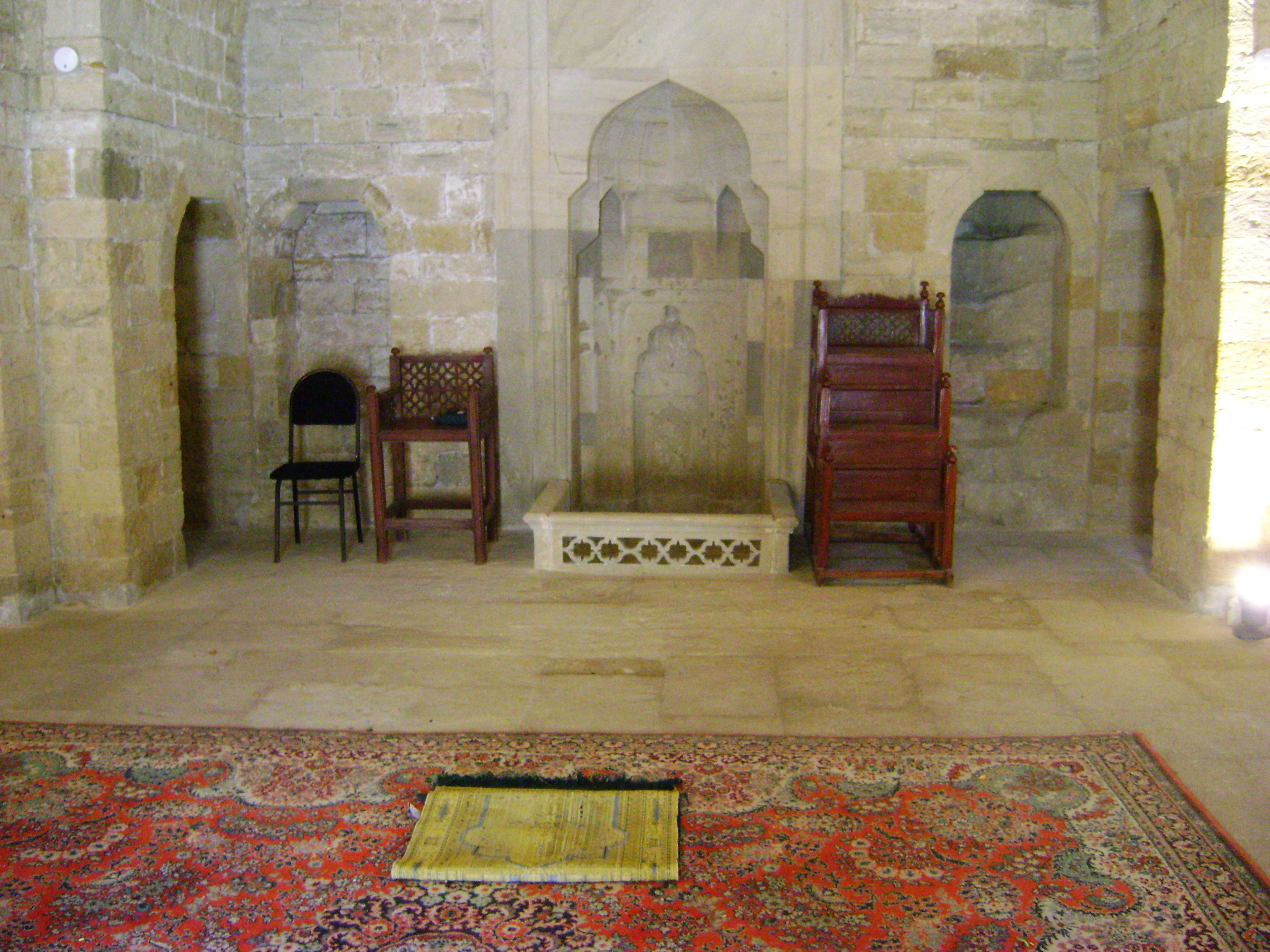

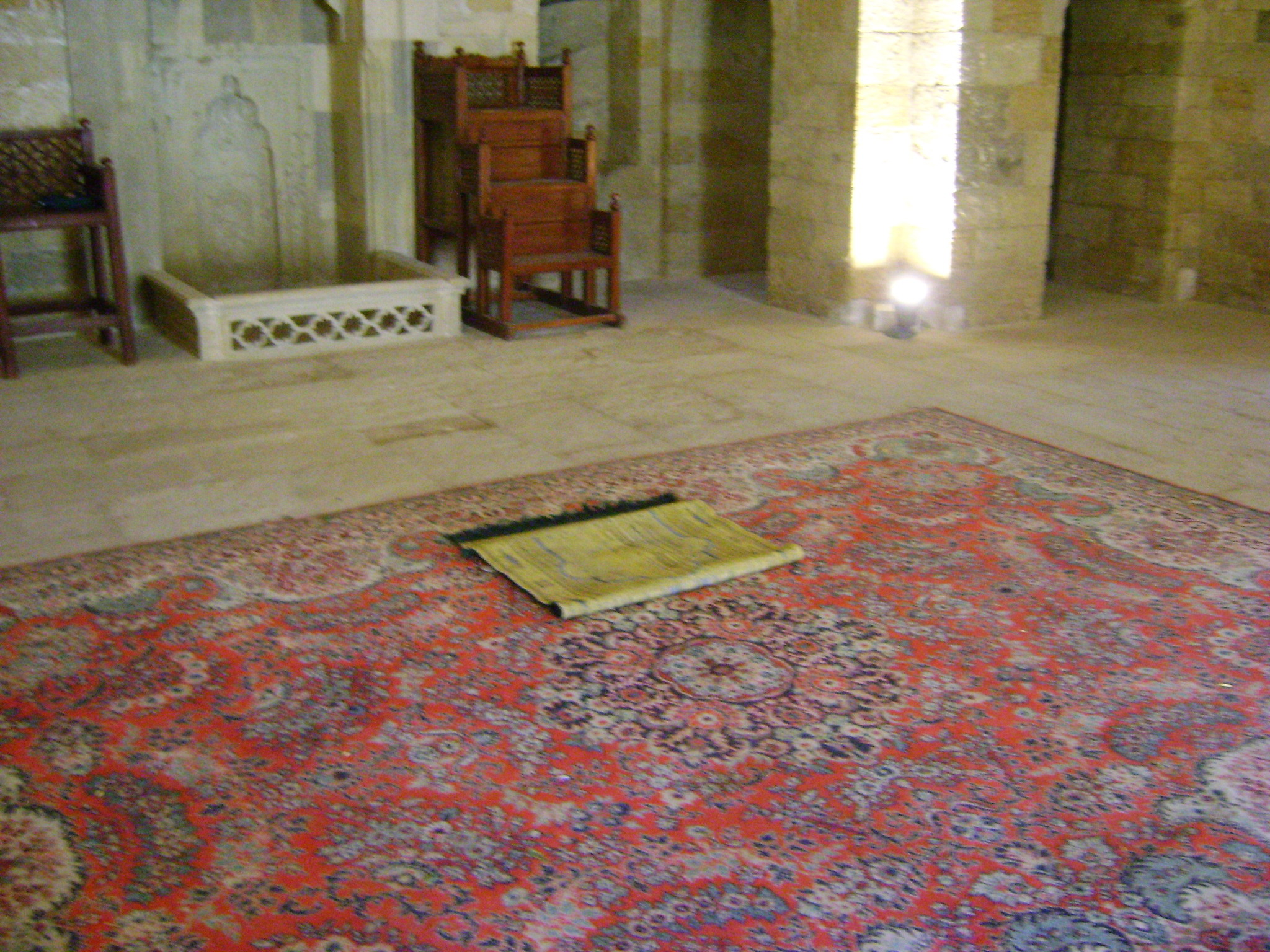

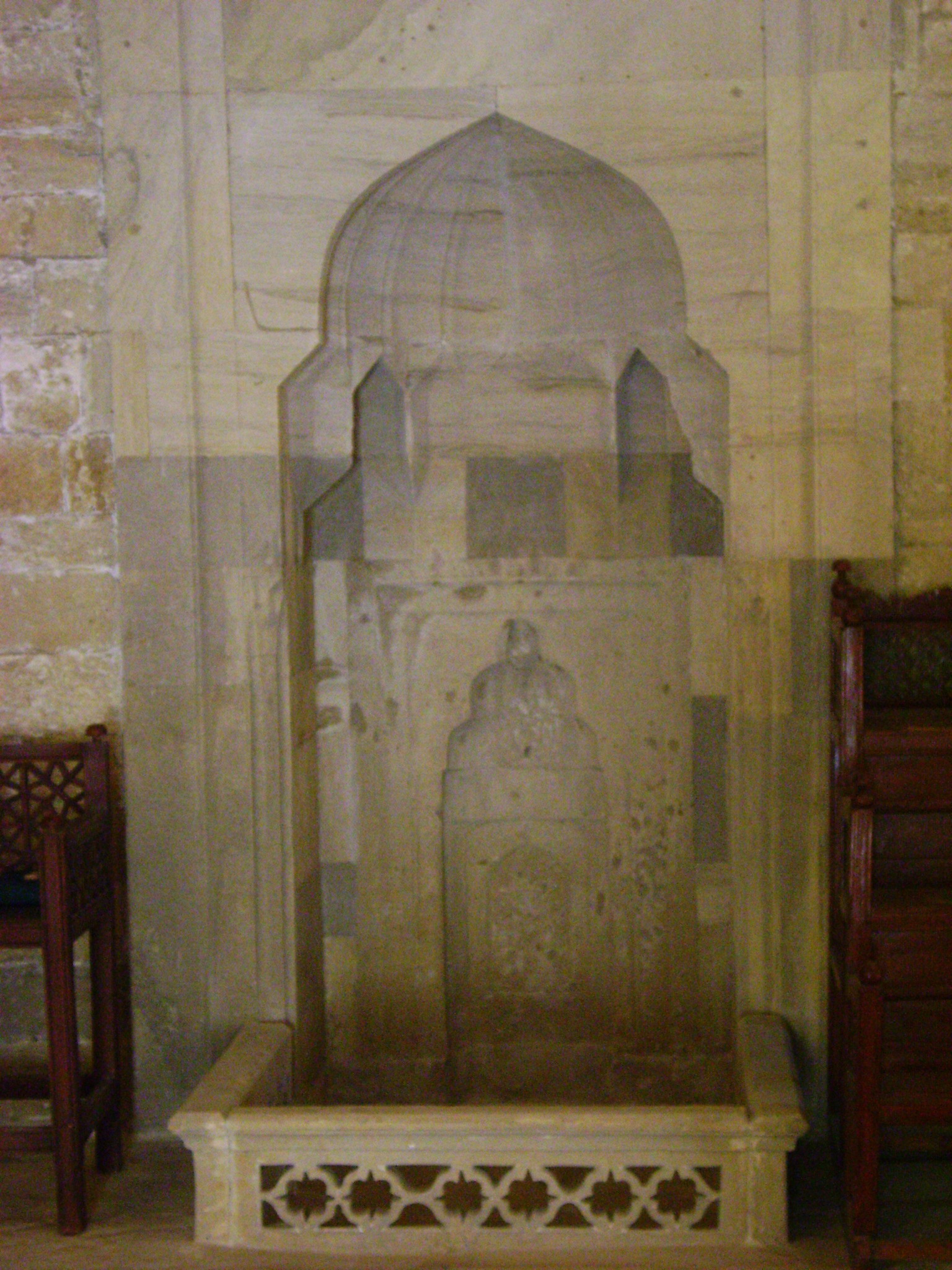
Mihrab

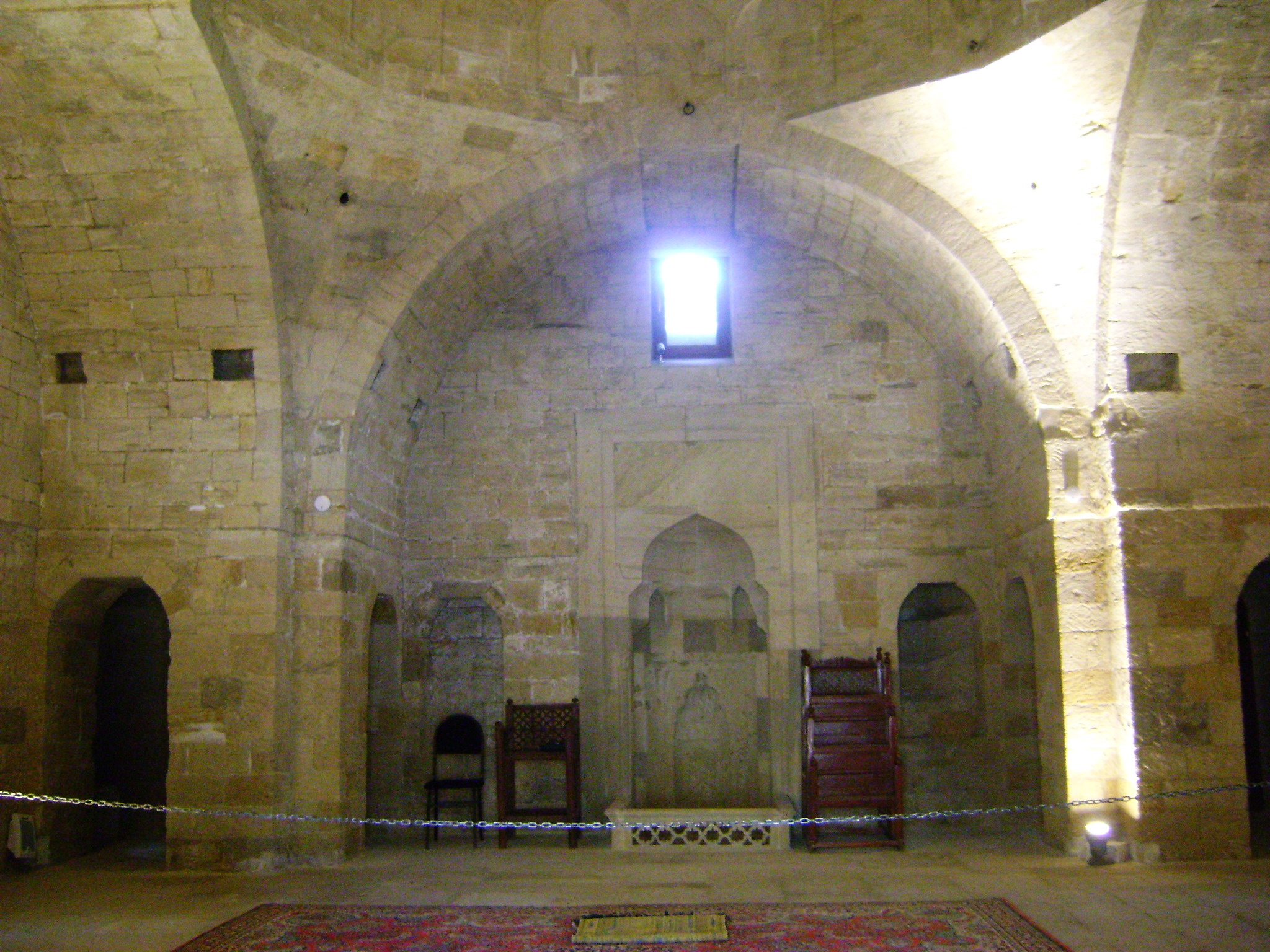

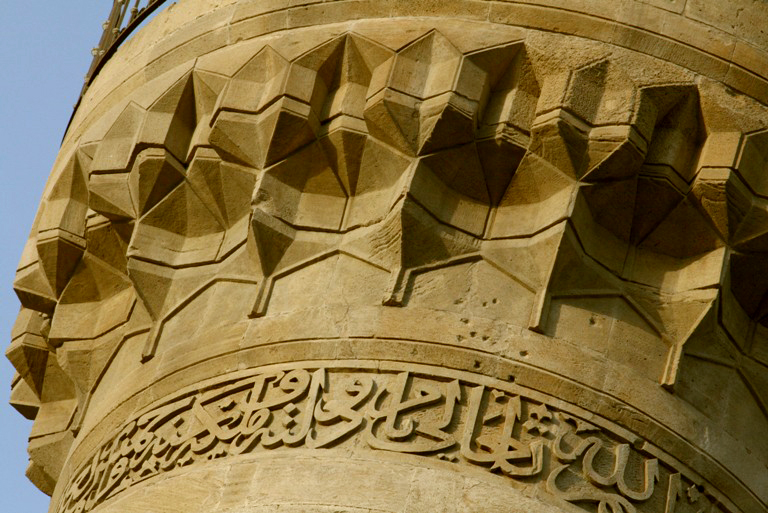

== See also ==
- Islam in Azerbaijan
- List of mosques in Azerbaijan
- List of mosques in Baku
