= Ləkit =

- Municipality
- Location within Azerbaijan Location within Shaki-Zagatala Economic Region
- Coordinates: 41°29′03″N 46°50′38″E
- Country: Azerbaijan
- Rayon: Qakh

Population
  - Total: 1,510
- Time zone: UTC+4 (AZT)
  - Summer (DST): UTC+5 (AZT)

Ləkit (also, Lekit and Lyakit) is a village and municipality in the Qakh Rayon of Azerbaijan. It has a population of 1,510.

== History and Etymology ==
In written historic courses which have been saved up to the present, the village has been mentioned for the first time in a Georgian Gospel's Anderdzi (postscript), written in 1300–1310, during the reign of king George V the Brilliant of Georgia. It is said that catholicos of Georgia Ekvtime III visited Lekarti Saint Nino church, then part of the Kak-Eliseni district of the Kakheti province of Kingdom of Georgia. Originally the village was called "Lekarti". The postal code is AZ 3424.

Georgian sources claim that the village's oldest name "Lekarti" (Georgian: ლექართი) is of Georgian origins and means "the place of Georgians" and that among the Dagestani Lezgins the village is also known as "Georgians' village". Letifova E.M considers that actual origin of toponym of villages such as Lekit, Lekit-Ketuklu, Lekit-Malakh in former Ilisu Sultanate are derived from ethnonym of Leg tribe of Caucasian Albania.

== Mamirli waterfall ==
Mamirli waterfall (covered with moss) is located in the village of Lakit-Kotuklu in Qakh District.

Located at the depth of a dense forest, with a height of 15m and width of 30m. The waterfall was registered as Qakh district protected Natural habitat on August 5, 2006.
