= List of monuments in Nakhchivan =

Nakhchivan is an Autonomous Republic within the territory of Azerbaijan Republic. There are historical monuments, mausoleums, museums on the territory of Nakhchivan, many of which have become historical monuments.

== Chalcolithic monuments ==
I Kultapa, Ovchular Tepesi, Sadarak, Khalac, Ərəbyеngicə and other monuments have been found during this period. More than 20 Chalcolithic monuments have been discovered during an archaeological expedition in the Sirab village of Babak region.

=== Duzdagh field ===
The length of the Duzdagh (de:Duzdağ) salt field is 3 km, width is 2 km, and the thickness is 150 m. According to short-term studies of the French-Azerbaijani expedition in 2007, the discovery of Eneolithic and Kur-Araz ceramics from the southern slopes of the deposit was supposed to start early in the operation of the mine. In order to obtain more comprehensive information, systematic investigations were launched in 2008.

== 6th-15th Centuries Monuments ==
Name	Picture	Date	Note
Gamigaya Petroglyphs		4th century	Gamigaya rock carvings (Azerbaijani: Gəmiqaya petroqlifləri) - are dated to the 4th-1st millennia BC including the Bronze and Early Iron Ages in the territory of Ordubad Rayon.
Saint Thomas Monastery of Agulis		4th century	Destroyed in the second half of the 20th century
Alinja Tower		7th-9th centuries	On February 11, 2014, Vasif Talibov signed an order on "Restoration of the historical monument" Alinja Tower. Facts related to the silver and copper coins of VII century as well as the architectural style of Fortress were discovered following the signing of this order.
Kohnagala		7th century	
Saint Karapet Monastery of Aprakunis		8th-9th centuries	Destroyed in 2004.
Armenian cemetery in Julfa		9th century-1605	Destroyed between 1998 and 2005.
Holy Saviour Monastery of Julfa		9th century	Destroyed
Noah’s Mausoleum (Nakhchivan, Azerbaijan)		8th century	The mausoleum was reconstructed in 2006.
Yusif ibn Kuseyir Mausoleum		1161–1162	Yusif ibn Kuseyir Mausoleum is one of the examples of Architectural school of Nakhchivan. The mausoleum consists of underground and surface parts and has been constructed in the octagonal form on both sides.
Momine Khatun Mausoleum		12th century	The Momine Khatun Mausoleum was established by the architect Ajami Nakhchivani. It is located in the city of Nakhchivan.
Atabey mosque		12th century	The architectural monument demolished in the 20th century is documented in images and photos from the 19th century.
Garabaghlar Mausoleum		12th–14th centuries	The Garabaghlar Mausoleum is located in Kangarli district, Garabaghlar village. The Order of the Chairman of the Supreme Assembly of the Autonomous Republic on the restoration and investigation of the Garabagh Tomb Complex came into force on July 4, 2016.
Gilan Mausoleum		13th century	There are several tombs in the Gilan city, Ordubad. One of them was found in 1979. The upper part of tomb was damaged.
Gulustan Mausoleum		13th century	The Gulustan Tomb, one of the examples of the 13th century Azerbaijani architecture, is located near the city of Julfa. Unlike other monuments, the Gulustan Tomb was built of stone.
Khanegah tomb		13th-15th centuries	The Naimi tomb, a mosque, the ruins of the unknown monument and other buildings have survived from historical architectural complex dating to the Middle Ages, located in the Khanegah village of Julfa region.
Dar tomb		1487–1488 centuries	

== 16th-18th Centuries Monuments ==
Name	Picture	Date	Note
Geysariyye Monument		XVII century	Geysariyye Monument, one of the 17th century monuments located in the center of Ordubad. During the Soviet era, one part of the building was used as a warehouse, and the other side as a dining-room. The monument was reconstructed in 1978 by the architect of the Ordubad Zakir Babayev. The building has been operating since 1981 as Ordubad District Historical-Ethnography Museum.
Juma Mosque, Ordubad		1604	Juma Mosque was built in the highest part of the city.
Imamzadeh complex in Nakhchivan		1722-1732	
Juma mosque of Nakhchivan		18th century	
Palace of Nakhchivan Khans		18th century	

== 19th Century Monuments ==
Name	Established
Nakhchivan State Museum of History	1924
House-Museum of Jalil Mammadguluzadeh (Nakhchivan)	December 31, 1998
Mausoleum of Huseyn Javid	1996
