= Twin-minaret portal of Nakhchivan =

Lost 12th-century monumental gateway in Nakhchivan, Azerbaijan

- Qoşa minarəli baştağ (Azerbaijani)
- The medieval architectural ensemble at Nakhchivan in a view published by Frédéric DuBois de Montperreux in 1843
- Location: Nakhchivan, Azerbaijan

History
- Built: Late 12th century

Site notes
- Architect: Ajami Nakhchivani
- Architectural style: Medieval Islamic architecture

Twin-minaret portal of Nakhchivan (Azerbaijani: Qoşa minarəli baştağ) was a monumental gateway in Nakhchivan, in present-day Azerbaijan. It stood near the Momine Khatun Mausoleum and formed part of a late 12th-century architectural ensemble associated with the Eldiguzid atabegs. The ensemble also included the now-lost Friday mosque of Nakhchivan.

The portal is attributed to Ajami Nakhchivani, the architect of the nearby Momine Khatun Mausoleum. Encyclopaedia Iranica states that Ajami designed the portal with two minarets near the mausoleum. Published readings of the inscriptions that were on the lost portal also associate the structure with Ajami ibn Abu Bakr of Nakhchivan.

The structure is often dated to 1187, although the surviving documentary record supports a broader attribution to the late 12th century. The original building and its inscriptions have disappeared. Its appearance is known through inscriptions copied before its destruction, travel accounts, drawings and photographs dating from the 19th and early 20th centuries.

== Historical context ==
During the 12th century, Nakhchivan was an important centre of the Eldiguzids, also known as the Atabegs of Azerbaijan. Monumental construction carried out in the city under their rule included the Momine Khatun Mausoleum and other buildings associated with the architectural activity of Ajami Nakhchivani. The Momine Khatun Mausoleum was completed in 582 AH (1186). Historical photographs examined by Ayşe Denknalbant show a larger architectural ensemble consisting of the mausoleum, a twin-minaret monumental portal in front of it and a Friday mosque nearby. Denknalbant identifies the group as part of the Eldiguzid palace complex. The exact spatial relationship between the lost structures can only partly be reconstructed. According to Denknalbant, old photographs appear to show an enclosure wall surrounding the mausoleum joining the twin-minaret portal. Encyclopaedia Iranica likewise treats the mausoleum, portal and Friday mosque as components of the same architectural complex, while describing Ajami's authorship of the Friday mosque as a presumption rather than an established attribution.

== Date and attribution ==
The portal is generally assigned to the final decades of the 12th century. Some modern studies date it specifically to 1187, shortly after the completion of the Momine Khatun Mausoleum. The surviving transcriptions of the portal inscriptions, however, do not preserve an unambiguous construction date, and modern reference works also describe the ensemble more broadly as belonging to the late 12th century.

Ajami's association with the portal is supported both by architectural scholarship and by published readings of an inscription that once existed above the entrance. The inscription was recorded before the monument disappeared and was understood as ending with a formula identifying Ajami ibn Abu Bakr of Nakhchivan as responsible for the work. Because the original inscription no longer survives, its wording is known through copies, transcriptions and later publications. Twentieth-century Azerbaijani epigraphist Ajdar Alasgarzade re-examined earlier readings and treated some words in the formula identifying the architect with caution. The attribution to Ajami is nevertheless also accepted by modern reference works, including Encyclopaedia Iranica.

=== Disappearance ===
The precise date and circumstances in which the portal disappeared have not been established. Eyice states that the large twin-minaret gateway remained in front of the mausoleum until the 1880s and that the buildings surrounding the mausoleum had disappeared by the end of the 19th century. Denknalbant likewise describes the portal and mosque as structures that have not survived and uses late-19th-century photographs to reconstruct the ensemble. Encyclopaedia Iranica, however, states more broadly that the portal is attested in photographs and drawings dating from the 19th and early 20th centuries. The surviving published evidence therefore does not establish a single secure date or cause for the monument's disappearance.

== Architecture ==
Historical representations show the structure as a large pointed-arched portal framed by two cylindrical minarets. The gateway stood in front of the mausoleum and was connected with the surrounding architectural ensemble. The portal and minarets belonged to a wider tradition of paired-minaret compositions in medieval Islamic architecture. Art historian Lorenz Korn notes that twin minarets became frequent during the Seljuk period, with surviving or reconstructed examples associated with the Friday mosques of Isfahan, Qazvin, Saveh and Gonabad and with the Imam Hasan Mosque at Ardestan.

Korn observes that paired towers could emphasize an entrance portal or major architectural axis and specifically cites the Momine Khatun complex at Nakhchivan as an example in which the gateway character of twin minarets was used in connection with a mausoleum.

The principal construction material of Ajami's surviving monuments at Nakhchivan is baked brick, combined in the Momine Khatun Mausoleum with geometric brickwork and glazed blue-green elements. Nineteenth-century descriptions of the lost structures also record Kufic inscriptions and coloured glazed decoration in the architectural ensemble.

=== Architectural significance ===
The portal is significant for the study of Ajami Nakhchivani because it documents a monumental architectural form associated with him beyond his two surviving tower mausoleums at Nakhchivan. Its paired-minaret composition also connects Nakhchivan with wider developments in Seljuk-period architecture. Korn places the Nakhchivan example within a broader group in which paired minarets emphasized gateways or major architectural axes and notes its use in association with the Momine Khatun Mausoleum. The surviving drawings, photographs and copies of inscriptions are therefore the principal evidence for reconstructing a monument that has otherwise disappeared from the urban fabric of Nakhchivan.

== Inscriptions ==
The inscriptions formerly attached to the portal are among the principal sources for its chronology, patronage and attribution. They were copied and studied by 19th-century European and Russian Orientalists and were subsequently re-examined by Azerbaijani epigraphists.

=== Muhammad Jahan Pahlavan inscription ===
An inscription in the upper part of the portal contained the name of the Eldiguzid ruler Muhammad Jahan Pahlavan. According to the readings reviewed by Quluzadə, his name was accompanied by titles and a funerary prayer asking God to illuminate his grave. Jahan Pahlavan died in 1186. The posthumous formula in the inscription has consequently been used in discussions of the portal's chronology and its relationship to the Momine Khatun Mausoleum, which was completed in the same period.

=== Amir Nureddin and Ajami inscription ===
Another Kufic inscription was recorded above the entrance arch. It mentioned an official named Amir Nureddin and described offices connected with the administration of the Eldiguzid state. The concluding section was read as identifying Ajami ibn Abu Bakr of Nakhchivan as the architect or builder responsible for the structure. The inscription is one of the main epigraphic grounds for associating the portal with Ajami. Since the architectural surface itself has disappeared, however, the text can now be studied only through the surviving documentary tradition of copies and scholarly readings. Different scholars did not agree on every part of the inscription programme. Nikolay Khanikoff interpreted part of the surrounding text as Qur'anic, whereas later examination by Alasgarzade identified Persian elements in the surviving copies and raised the possibility that more than one language had been used.

== Documentation and study ==
=== William Ouseley ===
One of the earliest known visual records of the medieval monuments of Nakhchivan was made by the British Orientalist William Ouseley, who visited the city in July 1812. His account was later published in the third volume of Travels in Various Countries of the East; More Particularly Persia in 1823. Ouseley described the ruins of Nakhchivan and recorded a building with two cylindrical towers or minarets near the Momine Khatun Mausoleum. He also referred to Kufic inscriptions decorating the structures and stated that he had made sketches of the monuments. A modern study of 19th-century representations of Nakhchivan identifies Ouseley's 1812 image, usually described as Remains of Nakhchivan, as an earlier visual record than the well-known drawings of Frédéric Dubois de Montpéreux. In Ouseley's image a structure with two minarets appears in the background.

=== Frédéric DuBois de Montperreux ===
The Swiss-French traveller and archaeologist Frédéric DuBois de Montperreux visited Nakhchivan during his travels in the Caucasus in the 1830s. His atlas, published in 1843, included a detailed view of the monuments of Nakhchivan and became an important visual record of structures that later disappeared. Copies of inscriptions collected in connection with Dubois de Montpéreux's work were subsequently examined by Orientalists. Christian Martin Frähn published a study of Nakhchivan inscriptions in 1837.

=== Nikolay Khanikoff ===
During the middle decades of the 19th century, Russian Orientalist Nikolay Khanikoff studied Islamic inscriptions of the Caucasus. His work included material from Nakhchivan and contributed to the preservation of readings from monuments that later disappeared. Khanikoff's readings became particularly important for the portal because they preserved portions of the inscriptions mentioning Amir Nureddin and Ajami Nakhchivani.

=== Late-19th-century documentation ===
The monuments of the Momine Khatun ensemble continued to be represented in drawings and photographs during the second half of the 19th century. A large photographic collection now held by the Bibliothèque nationale de France, catalogued as photographs of Persia, Azerbaijan and Armenia from 1889–1893, contains views associated with Nakhchivan. The city and its monuments were also reproduced in Paul Müller-Simonis's 1892 travel publication Du Caucase au Golfe Persique. Surviving historical images provide evidence for the changing condition of the architectural ensemble near the end of the 19th century. German architect Eduard Jacobsthal studied the medieval brick buildings of Nakhchivan and published his research in 1899. His documentation was subsequently cited in comparative studies of Seljuk architecture, including Korn's discussion of paired-minaret gateways.

=== Modern scholarship ===
In the 20th century the portal was discussed within broader studies of Ajami Nakhchivani and medieval Azerbaijani architecture. Semavi Eyice wrote that a large twin-minaret gateway remained in front of the Momine Khatun Mausoleum into the 19th century and that the other buildings of the complex subsequently disappeared. Encyclopaedia Iranica identifies the portal as a work designed by Ajami and notes that it is attested by photographs and drawings from the 19th and early 20th centuries. More recent epigraphic research has reconstructed the history of the lost inscriptions by comparing the readings and copies produced by Frähn, Khanikoff, Alasgarzade and other scholars.

== Historical images ==
View of Nakhchivan published by Frédéric DuBois de Montperreux in 1843

Detail of Dubois de Montpéreux's 1843 view

Nakhchivan, from a photographic collection dated 1889–1893

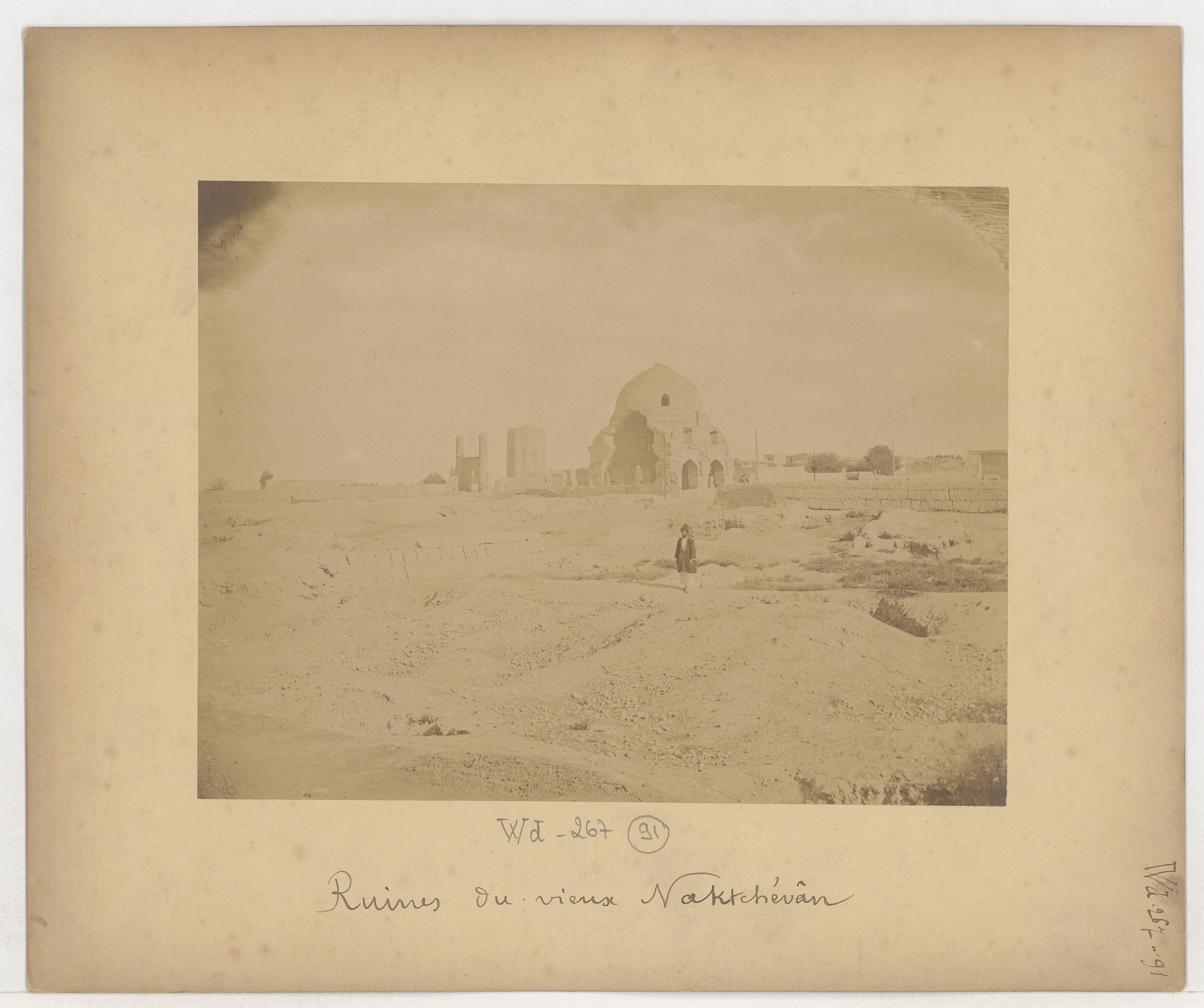
Another view from the 1889–1893 photographic collection

Nakhchivan in Paul Müller-Simonis's Du Caucase au Golfe Persique, 1892

Historical view reproduced in the Persian edition of Jean-Baptiste Feuvrier's account

== See also ==
- Ajami Nakhchivani
- Momine Khatun Mausoleum
- Yusif ibn Kuseyir Mausoleum
- Juma Mosque, Nakhchivan
- Architectural school of Nakhchivan
- Eldiguzids
- Seljuk architecture
