= Gurjulu Mausoleum =

Historic site in Qubadli, Azerbaijan

Gurjulu Mausoleum Gürcülü türbəsi

Religion
- Region: Qubadli

Location
- Location: Gurjulu
- Country: Azerbaijan
- Interactive map of Gurjulu Mausoleum; Gürcülü türbəsi

Architecture
- Established: 18th century

Gurjulu Mausoleum (Azerbaijani: Gürcülü türbəsi) is a historical and architectural monument of the 18th century located in the territory of Gurjulu village of Qubadli District.

== History ==
There are no inscriptions on the monument, and it is possible that the mausoleum was completely without inscriptions. Therefore, researchers who studied the monument, in determining its history, relied mainly on architectural features. According to A. Salamzadeh, one of the main elements pointing to the history of the mausoleum is the settlement of the entrance in the form of a small relief portal. This approach is typical of the 17th-century Azerbaijani mausoleums. The shape of the arch that completes the portal is also characteristic of that period. Although such arches have been known for their purpose since ancient times, they were used as a decorative element only after the 17th century.

== Architecture ==
A. Salamzadeh writes that due to a number of features, the Gurjulu Mausoleum has a unique position among the octagonal mausoleums of Azerbaijan. The main feature of the mausoleum is the transition from its main architectural mass to the tent-shaped roof. The architect was able to create an original trumpet-shaped structure based on the shape of stalactite. In this way, he was able to make the transition from the octagonal plan to the hexagonal tent-shaped roof with a ring.

The architect's completely independent approach to the tectonic boundary of the transition cornice to the tent gave the mausoleum a unique look. According to the architect, the boundary of each axis of the tent is adapted to the tromp-shaped patterns of the ledge. This form of solution allowed to combine both parts of the mausoleum organically. At the same time, this method formed the plasticity and softness of the face of the monument. The architect managed to soften the rigid geometric shape of the octagonal mausoleums, complete with an octagonal tent.

The architect also designed the entrance in the form of a low-rise door, preserving the architectural traditions created by his predecessors.

== Literature ==
- Саламзаде, А. В. (1964). Архитектура Азербайдана XVI-XIX вв. Баку: Издательство Академии наук Азербайджанской ССР.
