= Nakhchivan Literature Museum =

Museum and research center in Azerbaijan

Nakhchivan Literature Museum named after Jalil Mammadguluzadeh
- Azerbaijani: Cəlil Məmmədquluzadə adına Naxçıvan Ədəbiyyat Muzeyi
- Location within Azerbaijan
- Established: June 12, 1967; 59 years ago
- Location: Nizami Street, 19, Nakhchivan, Nakhchivan Autonomous Republic, Azerbaijan
- Coordinates: 38°56′N 45°50′E
- Type: Literature
- Collection size: 18674
- Director: Alemzar Ibrahimova

The Nakhchivan Literature Museum (Azerbaijani: Naxçıvan Ədəbiyyat Muzeyi) is a museum, research center and educational institution in Nakhchivan, Azerbaijan. The Nakhchivan Literature Museum is named after the Azerbaijani journalist, educator and satiric writer Jalil Mammadguluzadeh.

== History ==
Nakhchivan Literature Museum named after Jalil Mammadguluzadeh was opened in Nakhchivan on June 12, 1967 with the decision of the government of Azerbaijan SSR adopted in 1965. At the time of opening, the museum had only 98 exhibits, but there are more than 19,000 exhibits at the moment. The new two-storey building of the museum was put into use in 2008 which has 3 main halls displaying the exposition on Azerbaijani literature in chronological sequence.

The collection of the museum includes valuable manuscripts, applied and fine art samples, ancient and contemporary books (including autographs), newspapers and magazines, items reflecting the history of Azerbaijan literature and other museum materials. The exposition is of great interest to well-known representatives of classical and modern Azerbaijan literature, poets, writers and literary scholars of Nakhchivan such as Jalil Mammadguluzadeh, Huseyn Javid, Aziz Sharif, Mammadjafar Jafarov, Abbas Zamanov, Latif Huseynzade, Isa Habibbayli, Mammad Araz and Islam Safarli. There are works of Azerbaijani brush masters and sculptors in the exposition and fund, documents about the history of Nakhchivan theater: posters, programs, sketches of representations, photographs reflecting the works of famous masters of the theater.

== Jalilkend branch ==
The museum located in Jalilkend village of Sharur, Nakhchivan where Jalil Mammadguluzade used to work as a teacher was established in 1987. The branch has been operating as a separate museum since 2013 based on the decision dated 15.02.2013 of Cabinet of Ministers of Nakhchivan Autonomous Republic. It was moved into the new building in 2015. The new building consists of an entry, an exhibition hall, fond room and 2 work rooms. There are 449 showpieces in the fond of the museum of which 274 are displayed in the main hall. The explosion includes the objects used by the writer, his works, documents, photographs and various issues of “Molla Nasraddin” periodical of which Jalil Mammadguluzade was the chief-editor, as well as books of different authors about Jalil Mammadguluzade.

== See also ==
- Nakhchivan city
- Nakhchivan State Museum of History
