= Nakhchivan Buzkhana =

Azerbaijanian ice-house

- Azerbaijani: Naxçıvan Buzxanası
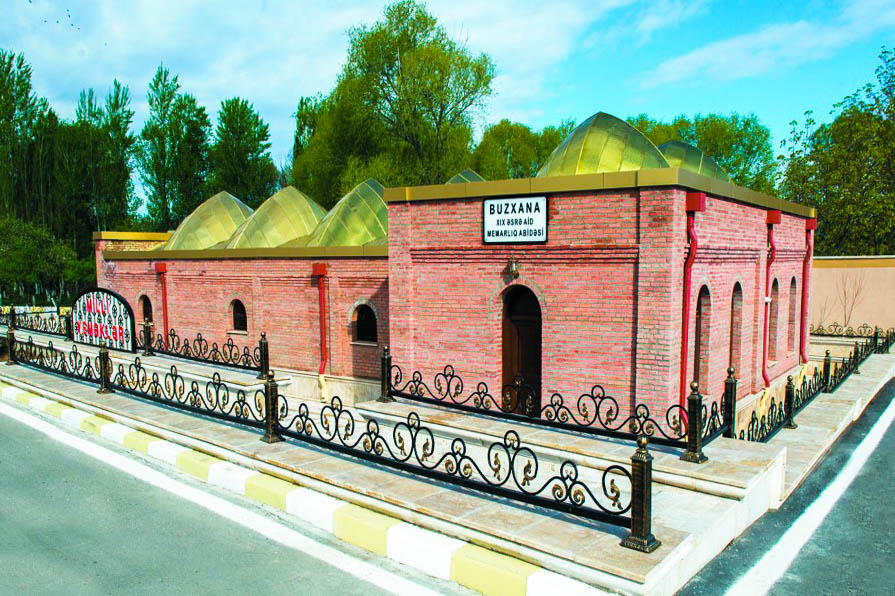

General information
- Location: Nakhchivan, Nakhchivan Autonomous Republic, Azerbaijan
- Completed: 14th-17th century

Nakhchivan Buzkhana is an ice-house located in Nakhchivan. It is one of the largest ice-houses in Azerbaijan. The ice-house is located on the southern side of the city of Nakhchivan, also near the Imamzadeh complex. There is also another ice-house with similar architectural structure in Ordubad, Azerbaijan. There are different ideas on date of build of the ice-house. Academicians A.Salamzadeh and K.Mammadzade proclaim that the buzkhana was built in the beginning of the XIV century. But it is also accepted that it was built during the reign of Shah Abbas in the XVII century. According to Arif Azizov, the honored architect of the Autonomous Republic and director of the Nakhchivan Scientific-Restoration Production Department, the ice-houses were built on the banks of the rivers historically.

== Design ==
The monument is in rectangular form. Its length is 20 meters, width is 9 meters, and height is 9.6 meters. A ventilation system was installed allowing the use of ice reserves efficiently in summer. There are six small domes on the roof. Typical features of the Nakhchivan ice-house are natural construction from bricks, the light and dynamic design scheme. The ice was destroyed as a result of intensive erosion. In 2013, it was restored by the instruction of the Chairman of the Supreme Assembly of the Nakhchivan Autonomous Republic.

== Usage ==
In ancient times, local residents used ice-houses to protect themselves and their personal food products against heat in summer. Ice was made during winter months. Water of the river was pumped into the cellar to make it ice. Usage of straw provided insulation against the melting of the ice. In the 20th century local residents started using refrigerators in their houses, which decreased the use of ice-houses.

== See also ==
- Ordubad Buzkhana
- Architecture of Azerbaijan
