= Abdulvahab Salamzadeh =

Soviet architect

Abdul Vahab Salamzadeh
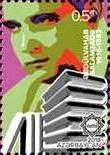
- A stamp depicting Salamzadeh published in 2018
- Born: February 16, 1916; Shamakhi, Baku Governorate, Russian Empire
- Died: August 19, 1983 (aged 67); Baku, Azerbaijan SSR, Soviet Union
- Occupation: Architect
- Awards: Order of the Red Banner of Labour
- Projects: Momine Khatun Mausoleum; Yusif ibn Kuseyir Mausoleum; Garabaghlar Mausoleum; Vagif Mausoleum

Abdul Vahab Rahim oglu Salamzadeh (Azerbaijani: Əbdülvahab Rəhim oğlu Salamzadə, Russian: Абдул Вагаб Рагим оглы Саламзаде; February 16, 1916 – August 19, 1983), was a Soviet-Azerbaijani art critic, architect, doctor of art history, and academician. He had served as the deputy director of the Institute of Architecture and Art of the Academy of Sciences of the Azerbaijani SSR, and head of the department of history and theory of architecture in the same institute, and received the title of Honoured Builder of the Azerbaijan SSR.

== Early life ==
Abdul Vahab Rahim oglu Salamzadeh was born on 16 February 1916, in the city of Shamakhi in Azerbaijan, which was then part of the Russian Empire. From an early age, he was interested in art and construction, and showed great interest in historical and architectural monuments in Azerbaijan.

== Career ==
Abdul Salamzadeh was one of the first people to study the architectural history of Azerbaijan. He was instrumental in the study of Nakhchivan and Shirvan architectural schools, in the scientific identification of Tabriz and Arran architectural schools, and in their discovery.

Salamzadeh's activity was not limited to scientific and theoretical creativity. Throughout his life, he travelled around the regions of Azerbaijan, got acquainted with the condition of historical monuments, took part in their sizing and restoration sketches. Salamzadeh was appointed deputy chairman of the Society for the Protection of Historical and Cultural Monuments of Azerbaijan in 1962. He personally participated in the restoration of architectural monuments. Among them are the mausoleums of Momine Khatun and Yusif ibn Kuseyir in Nakhichevan. In 1982, a mausoleum based on a project of Salamzadeh and Elbrus Kanukov was erected over the grave of the prominent Azerbaijani poet Molla Panah Vagif in Shusha. Salamzadeh was also a lecturer at the Azerbaijan State University; he supervised graduate students at the Institute of Architecture and Art, and was a member of the Board and the Presidium of the Union of Architects of the Azerbaijani SSR.

In different years, Salamzadeh authored Monuments Speak, Architectural monuments of Azerbaijan, Ajami Nakhchivani, Monuments along the Araz and many other books. His most fundamental work is considered History of Architecture of Azerbaijan, co-authored with Mikayil Huseynov and Leonid Bretanitsky, published in Russian. He was also the first researcher of the history of urban planning in Azerbaijan, studying the urban culture of cities such as Shusha and Shaki.

== Death ==
Abdul Salamzadeh died on 19 August 1983, in Baku, which was then capital of the Azerbaijani SSR.

== Legacy ==
There is a street named after Salamzadeh in Baku.

== Notable works ==
- «История архитектуры Азербайджана»;
- «Архитектура Азербайджана XVI—XIX вв.»;
- «Жилые здания Азербайджана XVIII—XIX вв.»;
- «Памятники азербайджанского зодчество»;
- «Мавзолеи Азербайджана XII—XV вв. как памятники мемориальной архитектуры»;
- «Очерки истории архитектуры Советского Азербайджана»;
- «Развитие архитектуры в Азербайджанской ССР».

== Sources ==
- Zeynalova, A. (4 May 2011). "Tariximizə tarix qatan sənətşünas" [An artist who added history to our history]. Khalg Gazeti (in Azerbaijani).
- История СССР [History of the USSR] (in Russian). Moscow: USSR Academy of Sciences Publishing House. 1969.
- Avalov, Elturan Vali oglu (1977). Архитектура города Шуши и проблемы сохранения его исторического облика [The architecture of the city of Shusha and the problems of preserving its historical appearance]. Baku: Elm.
