= Nakhchivan necropolises =

Archaeological sites in Azerbaijan

- Type: Archaeological site
- Periods: Bronze Age, Middle Ages
- Location: Nakhchivan, Republic of Azerbaijan

Nakhchivan necropolises – is historical monuments located in and around the city of Nakhchivan in the Republic of Azerbaijan.

== Nakhchivan necropolis ==
The Nakhchivan necropolis is an archeological site of the Bronze Age on the northern outskirts of Nakhchivan city. The monument was accidentally discovered in 1968 when earth graves were destroyed during farm work. The surface of the rectangular tombs is covered with stone slabs 1 m long, 0.5 m wide and 0.2–0.3 m thick. The tombs are oriented from north to south, as well as from north to west. The remains of the skeletons are very poorly preserved. In one of the graves, a skeleton that was folded from south to west survived. In other graves, 7 skulls were found in poor condition. Collective burial customs are typical for the Middle and Late Bronze Ages of Nakhchivan, as well as the first Iron Age tombs. Rare examples of material culture from the graves – painted clay vessels, bronze ornaments of various shapes (bracelets, rings, earrings, etc.) – beads made of different minerals, etc. found. Inside the pottery, painted pink, black, brown, red and yellow dishes are made with special delicate taste. According to the stratigraphy of household monuments of Nakhchivan, as well as the technological analysis of archeological materials, the Nakhchivan necropolis dates back to BC. It belongs to the middle and end of the second millennium. Materials from the necropolis are on display at the Nakhchivan State Museum of History.

== Nakhchivan necropolis I ==
Nakhchivan necropolis I is an archeological monument of antiquity near the Nakhchivan necropolis. It was discovered by accident during construction in 1970. The monument with an area of 1.9 hectares consists of six destroyed tombs. Materials from the monument were numbered by serviceman Peters and donated to the Georgian State Museum of History. As a result of archeological excavations, pink clay pots were found in the tombs, simple pottery covered with red paint and sometimes polished, gray clay products, bracelets made of silver and bronze, pins, rings and earrings, carnelian, paste, glass and agate beads? glass seal, a silver drachma belonging to Alexander the Great. The findings of the necropolis It belongs to the IV-III centuries.

== Nakhchivan necropolis II ==
Nakhchivan necropolis II is an archeological site of antiquity located on the left side of the Nakhchivan-Shahbuz highway, at the end of the military camp. Nekrpol was discovered by accident during construction in 1990. During the construction, the pit graves and material-cultural samples found in them were damaged. Materials obtained from the monument were collected by the employees of the Nakhchivan Regional Scientific Center of AMEA and handed over to the Nakhchivan State Museum of History. According to the findings, the necropolis It belongs to the II-I centuries.

== Nakhchivan necropolis III ==
Nakhchivan necropolis III is an archeological site located in the territory of medieval Nakhchivan city (Yezidabad fortress). The necropolis was discovered in 1987. During archeological excavations, two pit graves were studied on the south-eastern side of the fortress. Gray, polished clay pots, pink jug fragments, iron buckles, spearheads and other artifacts were found in the graves. According to the obtained materials, the necropolis belongs to the early Middle Ages (III-VII centuries).

== Medieval age Nakhchivan necropolis ==
The medieval age Nakhchivan necropolis is an archeological site of the 11th–18th centuries west of the Old Fortress in the city of Nakhchivan. At present, the "Imamzade" architectural complex, built in the 12th–18th centuries, remains here. The area around the architectural complex is a medieval cemetery. Part of the cemetery was destroyed during construction, and part still remains. Most of the graves have lost their surface features. Due to the location of the necropolis on the slope, some graves were excavated. There are also tombs made of baked bricks. Studies show that over time, the location of the necropolis changed and moved to the top of the hill near the "Imamzade" complex. The necropolis can be dated to centuries.
