= Gilan Mausoleum =

Ancient site in Nakhchivan, Azerbaijan

Gilan mausoleum
- Azerbaijani: Gilan türbəsi
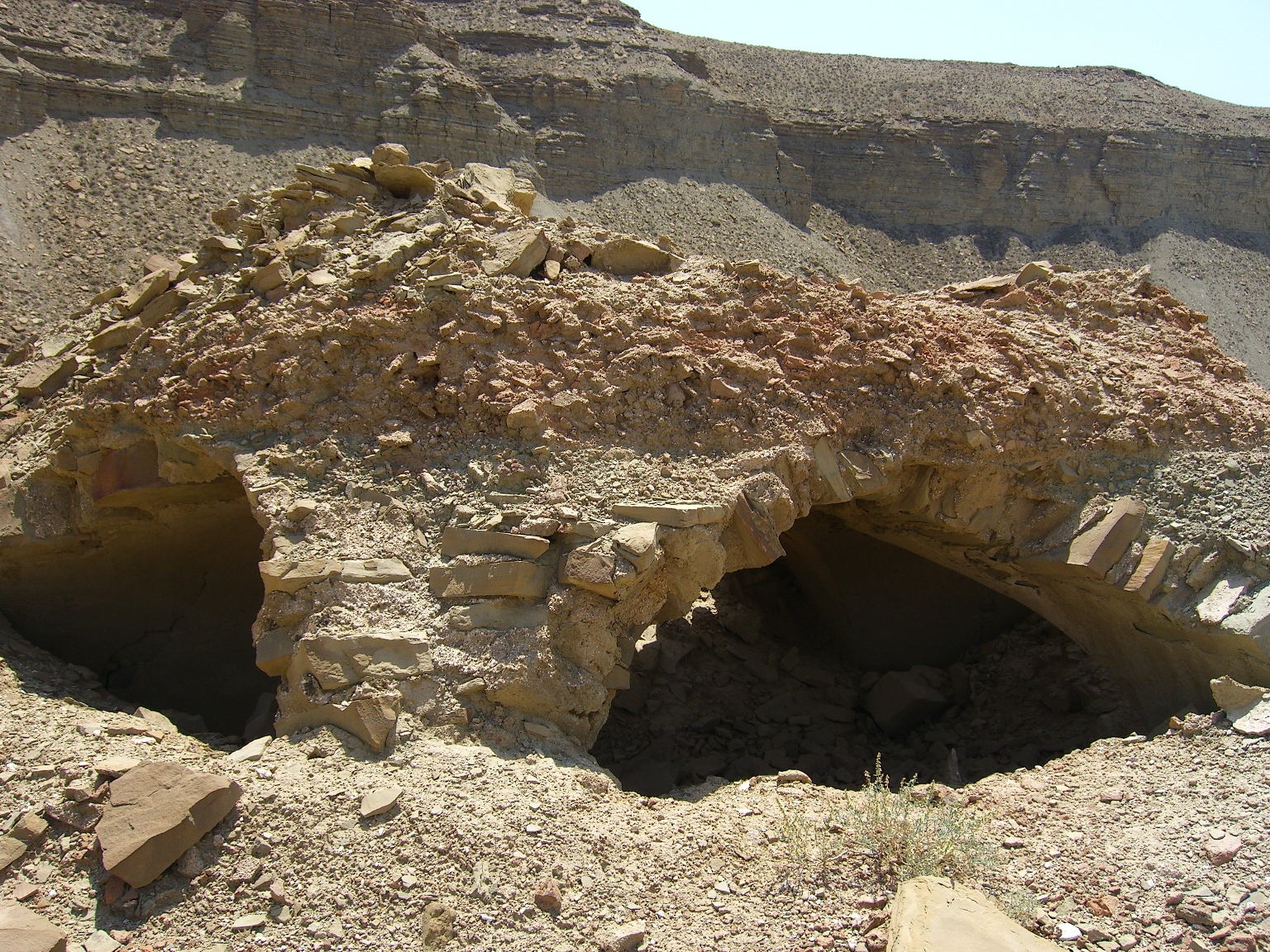
- Ruins of the Gilan mausoleum

- Location within Azerbaijan

General information
- Type: Mausoleum
- Architectural style: Architectural school of Nakhchivan
- Location: Kharabagilan habitation, Ordubad, Nakhchivan Autonomous Republic, Azerbaijan
- Coordinates: 38°54′17″N 46°01′23″E
- Completed: 13th century

Technical details
- Material: Stone, brick

Gilan mausoleum (Azerbaijani: Gilan türbəsi) is a monument located on the slope of a hill in Ordubad district of Nakhchivan Autonomous Republic in the territory of Kharabagilan habitation. The mausoleum was discovered accidentally by the local population in 1979. The top tower of the tomb was destroyed, but the tomb is in satisfactory condition.

== Architectural features ==
The plan of the tomb is octagonal internally, and rectangular externally. Inside of the monument, there is a low pavement that does not fit with the environment

of the interior. The tomb of the Gilan mausoleum differs from the octagonal tombs of medieval architecture that are spread in Azerbaijan and neighboring countries. the Center of the cover of the Gilan mausoleum is supported by a mushroom-shaped - expanding upward column in the center of the interior. The column is also octagonal in the plan.

The general composition of Gilan mausoleum is in a style with the 12th-century mausoleums of Central Azerbaijan, especially the Red Dome mausoleum. The Gilan mausoleum was built of layers of broken rock fragments from surrounding rocks. Unlike its interior, the exterior of the monument is neatly built. In the interior the ceiling and floors are completely, as well as spaces between stones of the wall and central support are plastered with white solution. Dark gray stone cuttings and roughness creates natural decorative order. Expression of the interior of the tomb is based on the pure volume structure of the shapes.

Outside, on the upper layer of the tomb a cubicle body was raised. The top tower was completely built of brick and decorated with geometric ornaments made from bricks. The corners of the body were covered with cylindrical brick columns. The bottom part of one of these columns remains. In the decoration of the monument, blue glazed bricks were used as well.

== Research ==
There is no evidence of the time of the mausoleum construction. However, according to the architectural features mentioned above, it is possible to predict the period of the tomb of Gilan for architectural patterns and geometric patterns.

The architectural style of the Gilan mausoleum is in the same line with the architectural style of the churches built in the 12th century in Central Azerbaijan. Gilan mausoleum can be dated back to the 12th century as a result of the absence of inscription.
