= Ismayil Khan Bath =

Architectural school in Nakhchivan

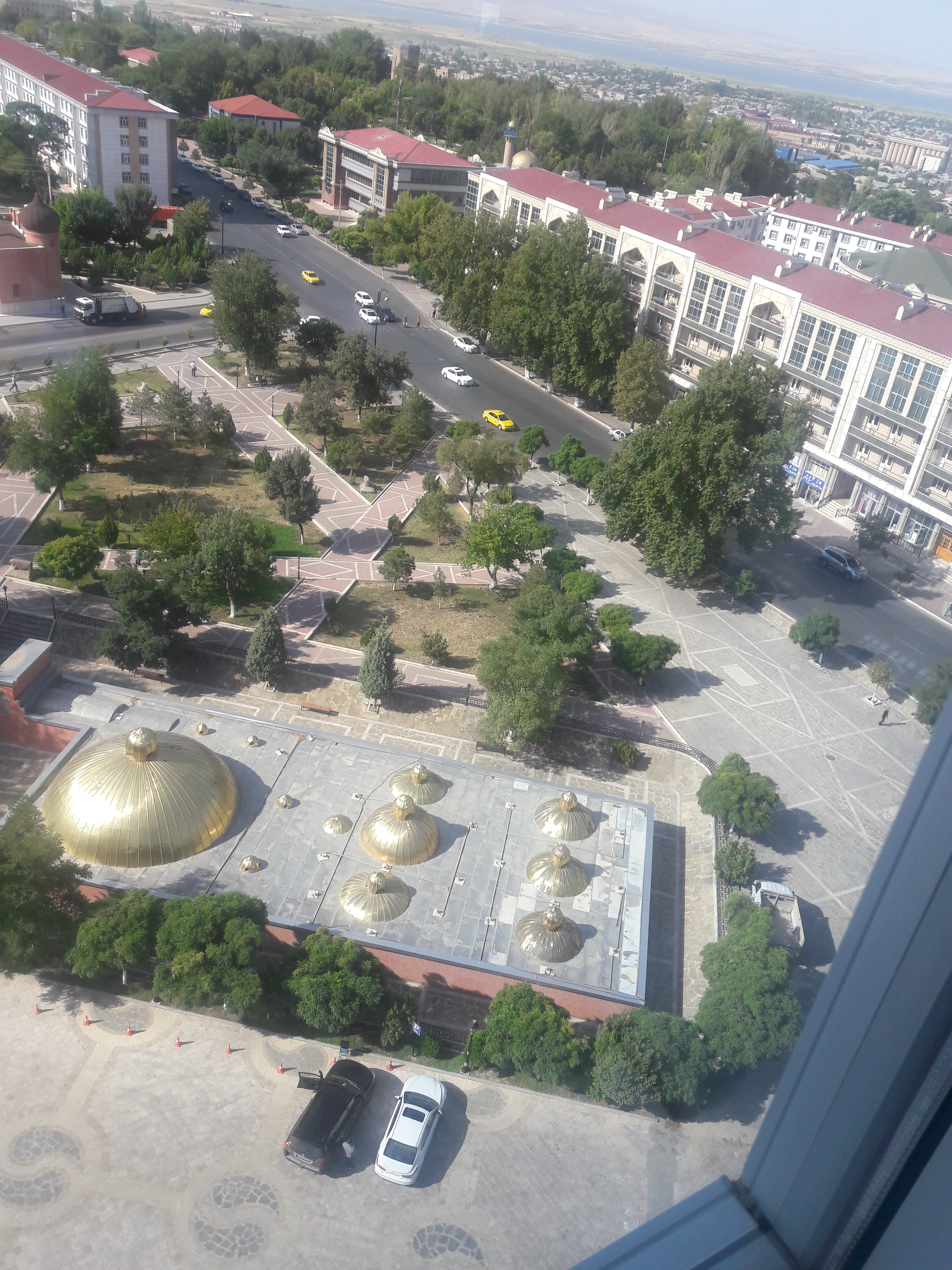
- Interactive map of Ismayil Khan Bath
- Type: Architectural school of Nakhchivan
- Location: the intersection of H. Aliyev Avenue and Tabriz Street
- Area: Nakhchivan Autonomous Republic

Ismayil Khan Bath or the Eastern Bath — a bathhouse and an architectural monument located in the city of Nakhchivan, Azerbaijan.

The bathhouse was included in the list of nationally significant architectural monuments by Decision No. 132 of the Cabinet of Ministers of the Republic of Azerbaijan dated August 2, 2001, and by Decision No. 98 of the Cabinet of Ministers of the Nakhchivan Autonomous Republic dated November 21, 2007.

== About ==
Ismayil Khan Bath is located in the city of Nakhchivan, at the intersection of H. Aliyev Avenue and Tabriz Street, in Dada Gorgud Square. The bathhouse, dating back to the mid-18th century, consists of an entrance, service hall, bathing hall with a pool, reservoir, and furnace room. Its total area is 526 m^{2}. The rectangular-shaped bathhouse was built of baked bricks. The exterior of its portal with a cross-vault is decorated with tiles. The changing hall is octagonal in shape. Along the walls of the hall, there are six deep niches. The bathing hall has two passages, one of which leads to another room. In the center of the hall, a pool measuring 2x2 meters was constructed. The 108 m^{2} hall is covered with a spherical dome. The bathhouse is illuminated by small windows placed in the walls of the halls and by openings on the dome. The reservoir of the bathhouse is located on the western side of the building, adjacent to the bathing hall. Water supply is provided through a kahriz system. Heating of the rooms is carried out by means of underground channels. The bathhouse was built by Ismayil Khan, the son of Karim Sultan Kangarli, the ruler of Nakhchivan.

After the restoration of Azerbaijan's independence, the bathhouse was included in the list of locally significant immovable historical and cultural monuments by Decision No. 132 of the Cabinet of Ministers of the Republic of Azerbaijan dated August 2, 2001.

In 2005, the bathhouse underwent major restoration works.

By Decision No. 98 of the Cabinet of Ministers of the Nakhchivan Autonomous Republic dated November 21, 2007, the bathhouse was included in the list of nationally significant architectural monuments.
