= Jame Mosque, Nakhchivan =

Mosque in Nakhchivan, Azerbaijan

Coordinates: 39°12′28″N 45°24′27″E

Jame Mosque
- Came məscidi
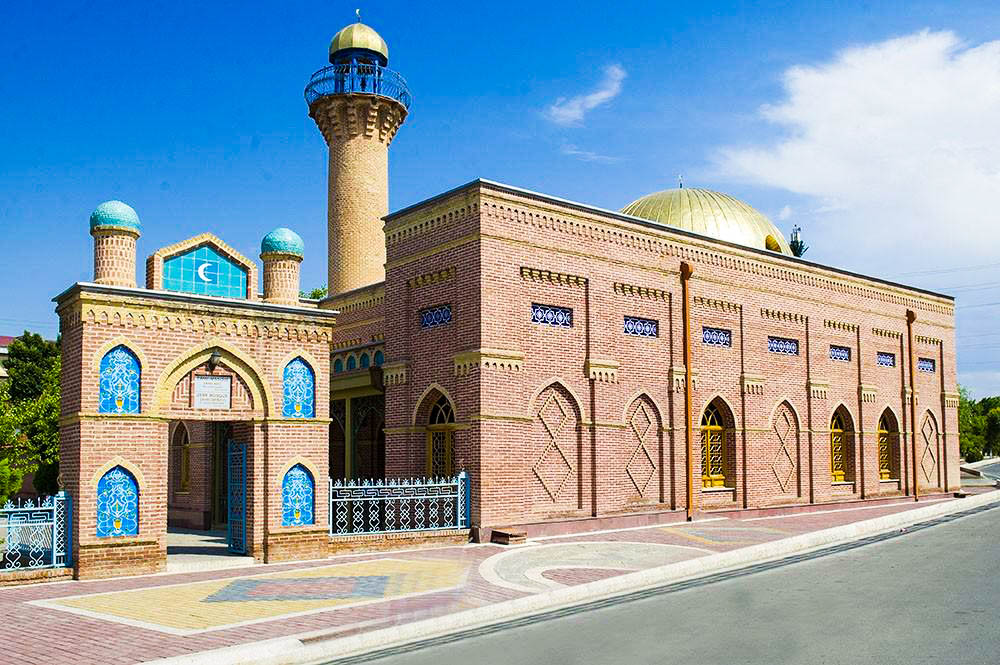

Religion
- Affiliation: Islam

Location
- Location: Nakhchivan
- Country: Azerbaijan

Architecture
- Type: Mosque

Specifications
- Interior area: 736 m^{2} (7,920 sq ft)
- Minaret: 1
- Minaret height: 15 m (49 ft)
- Site area: 1,000 m^{2} (11,000 sq ft)
- Materials: Fired brick

The Jame Mosque (Came məscidi), also known as the City Mosque, is a mosque and architectural monument in central Nakhchivan, Azerbaijan. The inscription above its entrance refers to it as the Jafariyya Mosque.

Published sources differ on the chronology of the present building. The Encyclopaedia of Nakhchivan Monuments dates it, on architectural and constructional grounds, to the 18th century and describes the work of 1894 as a restoration. Epigraphic studies, however, interpret the entrance inscription as recording construction of the mosque in 1311 AH (1894 CE).

== History ==
=== Inscription and dating ===
A marble inscription is located above the western entrance of the mosque. In her study of Azerbaijani epigraphy, Mashadi Khanum Nemat recorded the plaque as measuring 87 cm × 57 cm (34 in × 22 in) and described its text as being written in Nastaliq script in Arabic and Persian.

The inscription begins with a religious text and is followed by information concerning the mosque and its patronage. It records the year 1311 AH (1894 CE) and names Haji Muhammad Jafar Agha, the son of Haji Novruz of Nakhchivan. Səfərli and Seyidov state that the work was completed under his patronage in Rajab 1311 AH.

The inscription also records that Muhammad Jafar Agha endowed two shops for the expenses of the mosque and for the support of those serving there.

According to Səfərli and Seyidov's reading of the final part of the inscription, the text was written by Muhammad Naqi and engraved by Muhammad Saleh, both associated with Tabriz.

The architect's name is not stated directly. Səfərli and Seyidov interpret a phrase in which the architect refers to himself by "the name after the eighth Imam" as an allusion to Muhammad Taqi, the ninth Imam in Twelver Shia Islam.

The interpretation of the inscription has resulted in differing chronologies in published sources. The 2008 Encyclopaedia of Nakhchivan Monuments regards the building as an 18th-century structure and the 1894 work as a restoration. By contrast, Səfərli and Seyidov interpret the wording of the inscription as evidence that the Jafariyya Mosque was built in 1894. A 2023 publication of the Baku International Multiculturalism Centre likewise translates the inscription as stating that the mosque was built in 1894.

=== 20th and 21st centuries ===
The Encyclopaedia of Nakhchivan Monuments and a 2023 publication of the Baku International Multiculturalism Centre state that the mosque's minaret was damaged by artillery fire in 1918 and was subsequently restored. These sources also refer to a 1920 painting of the mosque by Azerbaijani artist Bahruz Kangarli as depicting the damaged minaret.

The same publications describe the Jame Mosque as the only mosque in the Nakhchivan Autonomous Republic that remained in operation during the Soviet period.

The mosque underwent a major restoration in 2007.

== Architecture ==
The mosque and its minaret are built of fired brick. A 2023 publication gives the total area of the complex, including the courtyard, as approximately 1,000 m^{2} (11,000 sq ft), and the interior area as 736 m^{2} (7,920 sq ft). The mosque has a single minaret, 15 m (49 ft) high, with one balcony.

A marble epigraphic plaque is installed above the entrance on the western side of the building.

== Heritage status ==
A 2009 register of protected monuments in the Nakhchivan Autonomous Republic records the Jame Mosque as having been included among monuments of local importance under Decision No. 132 of the Cabinet of Ministers of Azerbaijan, dated 2 August 2001.

The same register records that Decision No. 98 of the Cabinet of Ministers of the Nakhchivan Autonomous Republic, dated 21 November 2007, classified the mosque as an architectural monument of national importance.

== See also ==
- Juma Mosque, Nakhchivan
- List of mosques in Azerbaijan
- Islam in Azerbaijan
