= Ordubad Buzkhana =

- Azerbaijani: Ordubad Buzxanası
- Location within Azerbaijan

General information
- Type: Ice house
- Location: Ordubad, Nakhchivan Autonomous Republic, Azerbaijan
- Coordinates: 38.904870°N 46.019601°E
- Completed: XIV century
- Renovated: XVIII century, 2014

Ordubad Buzkhana – is an ice-house located in Ordubad. The architectural monument was built in the XIV century. It is one of the largest ice-houses in Azerbaijan. The ice-house is located on the southern side of the city of Nakhchivan, also near the Imamzadeh complex. It is one of three main ice houses in Nakhchivan, one of the other ones being Nakhchivan Buzkhana.

It was restored in the XVIII century. In 2014, the historical and architectural buzkhana was restored and operated again.

== Design ==
The total area of the ice house is 166 m^{2}, its height is 11,32 meters. The building consists of a large room in internal entrance, a double stair with 36 stairs and a cellar where the ice is kept. The ice house has 5 domes, a common hall, an entrance and an auxiliary room. The walls are built of baked bricks and lime-clay mixture. Thickness of the walls of the building is 0.8 meter. The ceiling of the room is flat.

== Usage ==
The ice house was built for commercial purposes. In the past, ice-houses were used by local residents to protect themselves, their personal belongings and their food products against heat in summer. Special people used to extract ice from the buzkhana by wearing special clothes and fed needs of people of Ordubad.

== See also ==
- Nakhchivan Buzkhana
- Architecture of Azerbaijan
