= Juma Mosque, Nakhchivan =

Former medieval mosque in Nakhchivan, Azerbaijan

Juma Mosque of Nakhchivan
- Naxçıvan Cümə məscidi
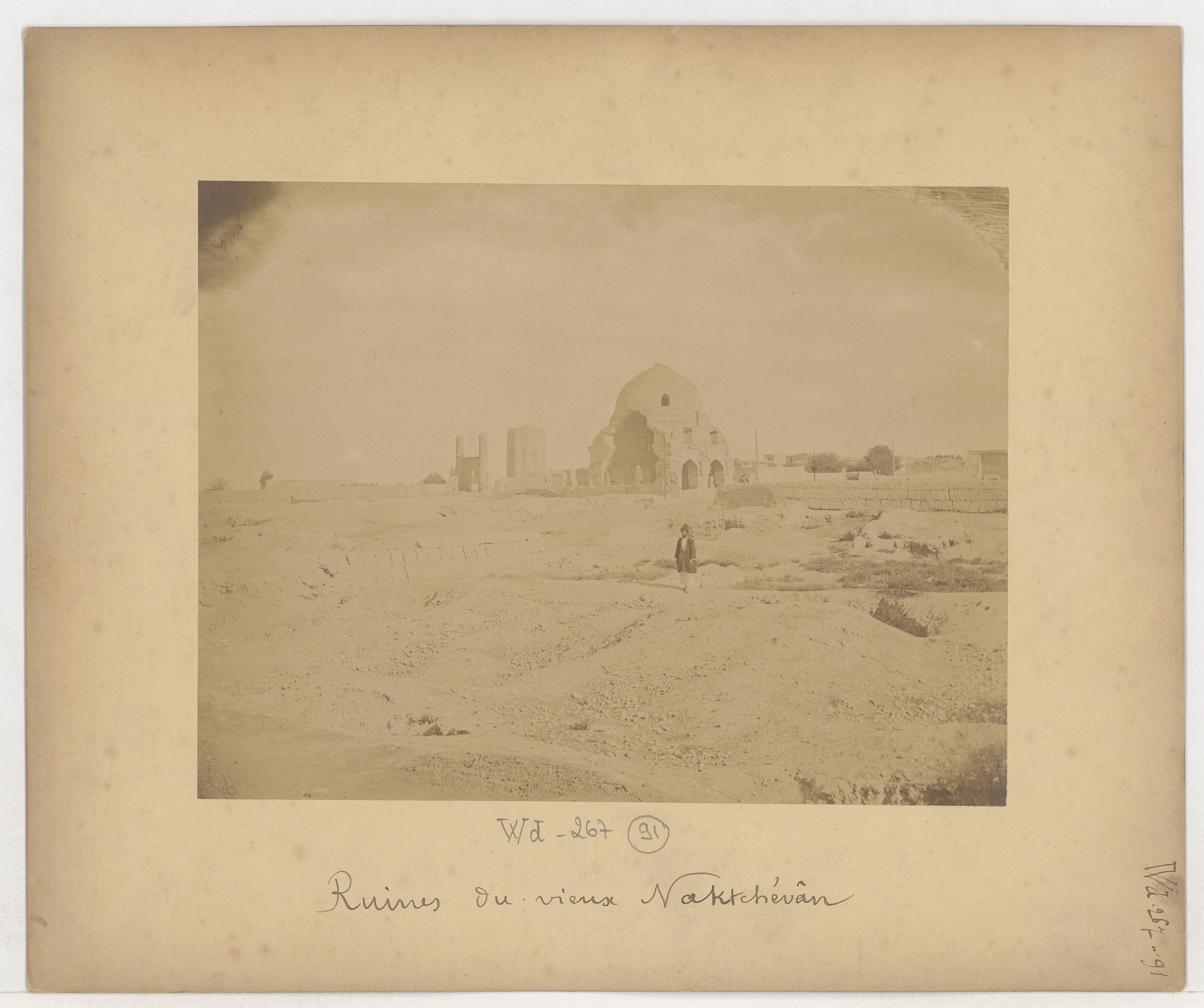

Religion
- Affiliation: Islam
- Status: Demolished

Location
- Location: Nakhchivan
- Country: Azerbaijan
- Interactive map of Juma Mosque of Nakhchivan

Architecture
- Type: Mosque
- Completed: Late 12th century (attributed)
- Dome: One (historical reconstruction)

The Juma Mosque of Nakhchivan, also known as the Friday Mosque of Nakhchivan, was a medieval congregational mosque in Nakhchivan, Azerbaijan. It formed part of the architectural complex associated with the Momine Khatun Mausoleum and the Eldiguzids. The mosque has not survived; its appearance is known principally from historical drawings, descriptions and photographs.

== History ==
The mosque is generally associated with the late 12th-century building programme around the mausoleum. It has been tentatively dated to the rule of the Eldiguzid atabeg Muhammad Jahan Pahlavan (1175–1186). The precise year of the mosque's construction has not been established by the cited sources.

The architect Ajami Nakhchivani is known to have designed the two-minaret portal near the mausoleum. His authorship of the mosque itself has been suggested but is not established. The dated portal and the mosque were separate structures within the architectural ensemble.

== Architecture ==
Published architectural descriptions reconstruct the mosque's arrangement from nineteenth-century visual records. The prayer hall had two aisles parallel to the qibla wall and a large dome in front of the mihrab. The building had an entrance with an iwan and two pointed-arched openings in each side wall.

The nearby portal was flanked by two minarets, but these belonged to the entrance structure of the complex and should not be counted as minarets of the mosque itself.

== Historical records ==
The mosque and its surrounding complex were documented in nineteenth-century illustrations and photographs. These records are important for studying the layout of structures that no longer survive. The sources cited here do not establish an exact year or cause for the mosque's final disappearance.

== See also ==
- Jame Mosque, Nakhchivan
- Momine Khatun Mausoleum
- Ajami Nakhchivani
