= Juma Mosque, Ordubad =

Mosque in Ordubad, Azerbaijan

Juma Mosque
- Azerbaijani: Ordubad Cümə Məscdi; Arabic: مسجد الجمعة (أردوباد)
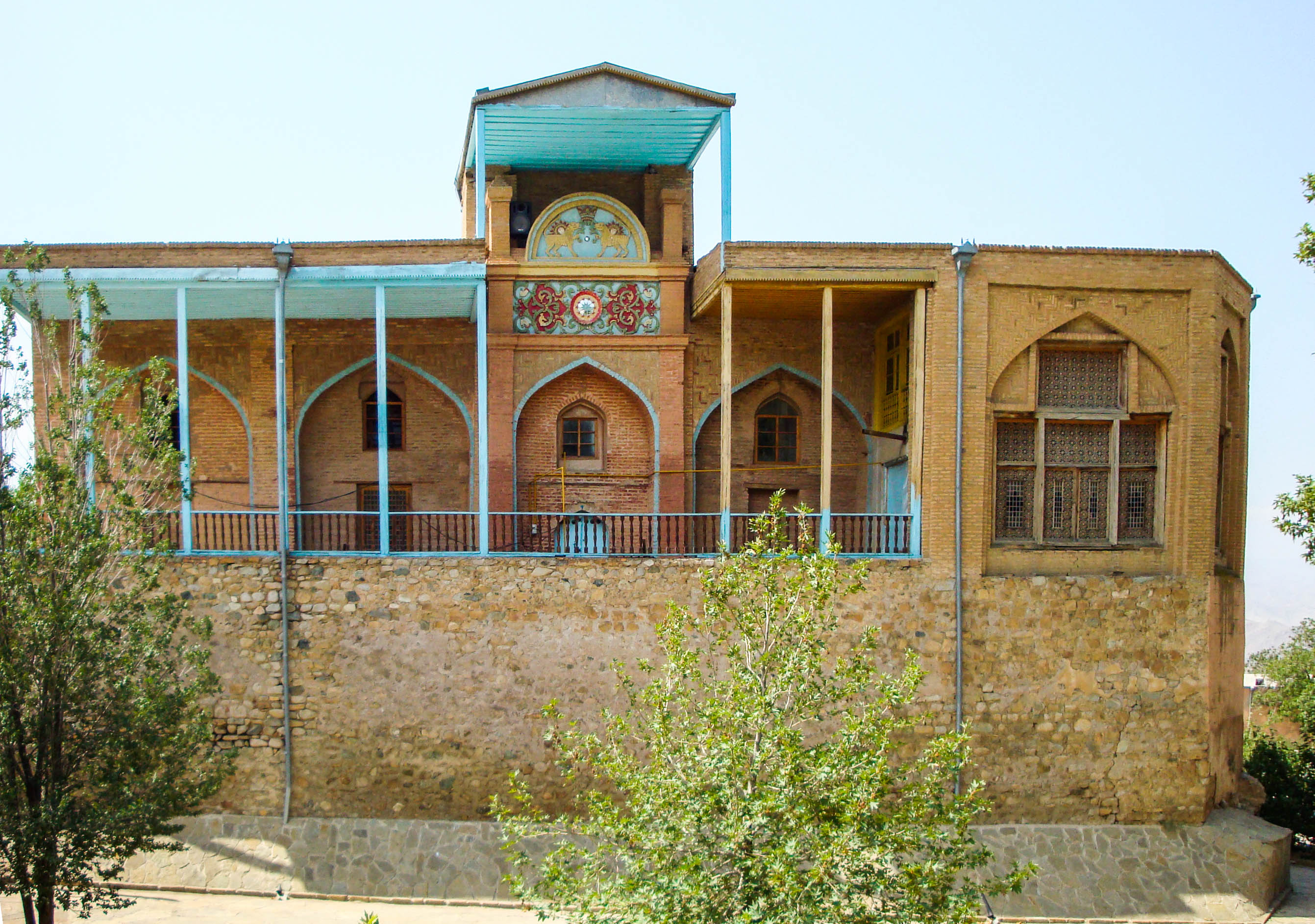

- Location of the mosque in Azerbaijan

Religion
- Affiliation: Islam
- Ecclesiastical or organisational status: Mosque
- Status: Active

Location
- Location: Ordubad
- Country: Azerbaijan
- Coordinates: 38°54′35″N 46°01′22″E

Architecture
- Type: Mosque architecture
- Style: Safavid
- Completed: 1604

Specifications
- Dome: One (maybe more)
- Materials: Stone; brick

The Juma Mosque of Ordubad (Azerbaijani: Ordubad Cümə Məscdi; Arabic: مسجد الجمعة (أردوباد)) is a mosque, located in Ordubad, Azerbaijan and is one of the cultic constructions of Ordubad city. The building is located on the highest place in the city.

== Architecture ==
The external architectural appearance of the mosque is dated from the 17th century according to its architectural segmentations. A ligature fixed on the entrance of the building shows that it was constructed in 1604, during the reign of the Safavid Iranian king Abbas I (r. 1588–1629). However, some elements in a plan of the mosque evidence that it was built earlier, but in the 17th century it was just reconstructed again. Three-paced praying hall takes the central place in the plan. The usage of deep arched niches attached to the frames of the arches is the peculiar feature of the architecture of cultic constructions. The walls of the mosque were built of rubble stone and plastered with 21 cm × 21 cm × 5 cm (8.3 in × 8.3 in × 2.0 in) bricks.

== See also ==
- Islam in Azerbaijan
- List of mosques in Azerbaijan
