= Ajami Nakhchivani =

12th and 13th-century architect

Ajami ibn Abubakr Nakhchivani
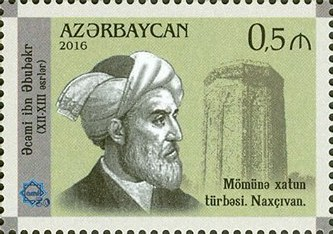
- Azerbaijani stamp dedicated to Ajami
- Born: 12th century
- Died: 13th century
- Occupation: Architect

Ajami ibn Abubakr Nakhchivani was a 12th and 13th-century Muslim architect who contributed greatly to the architecture of Nakhchivan. He was the founder of the Nakhchivan school of architecture and is the architect of buildings such as Yusif ibn Kuseyir Mausoleum, Momine Khatun Mausoleum and Juma Mosque.

== Architecture ==
=== Yusif ibn Kuseyir Mausoleum ===
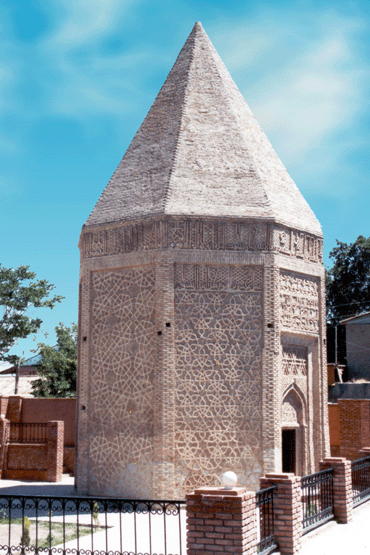
Yusif ibn Kuseyir Mausoleum

One of the ancient monuments created by Ajami is the mausoleum of Yusif ibn Kuseyir, known as "Atababa". The ayahs (verses) from Koran are inscribed on the walls of the monument. Date of construction of this mausoleum (1161-1162 AD) was defined from its traditional built-in plate or katiba. This eight-sided mausoleum consists of the underground plinth burial place (sardaba, Persian: سردابه or cellar) and its on-ground top. Each side of this construction is decorated with various ornaments.

=== Momine Khatun Mausoleum ===
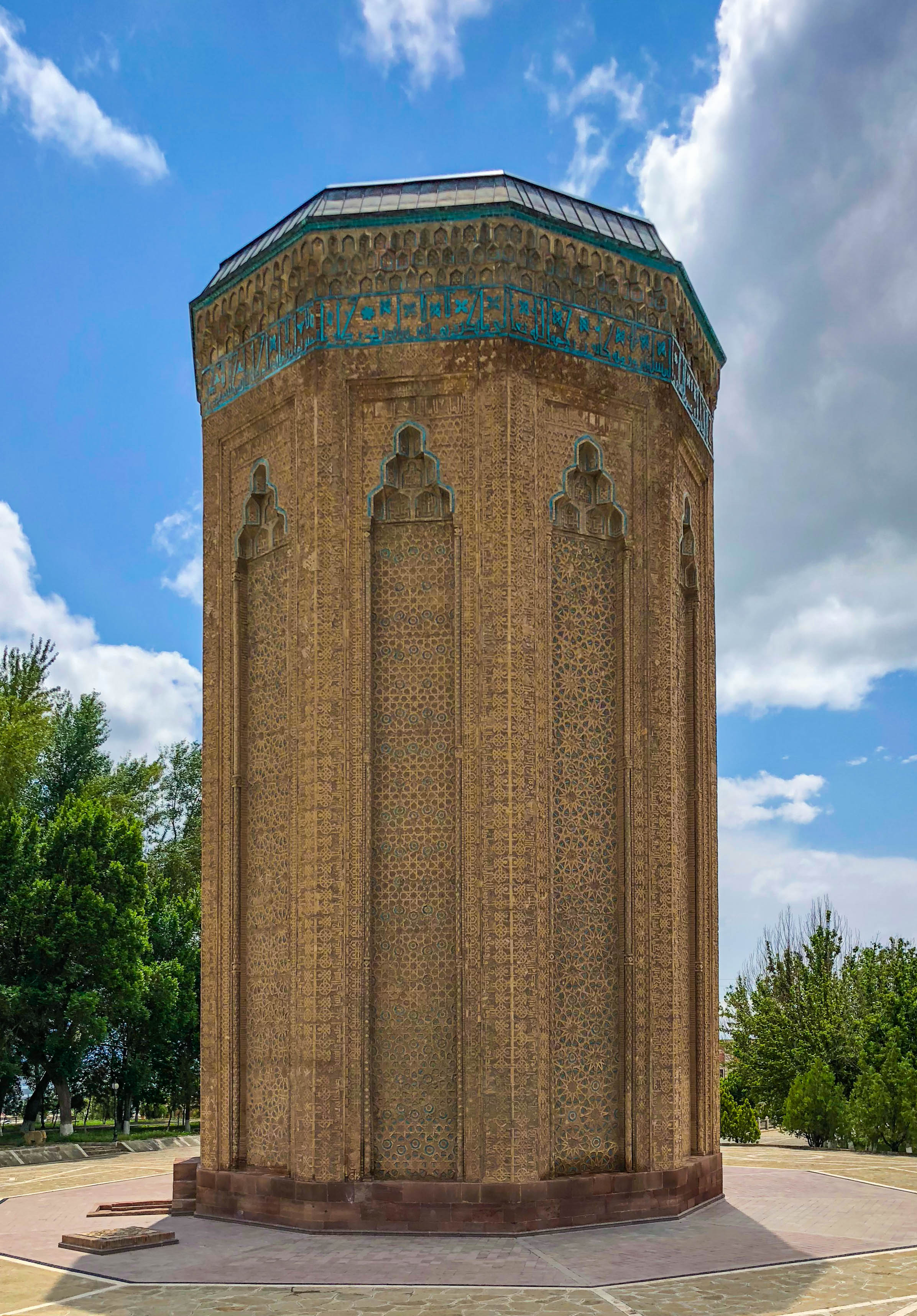
Momine Khatun Mausoleum

The masterpiece of Ajami is the Momina-Khatun's mausoleum, also known as the Atabey's Cupola - Atabei Gumbazi. The mausoleum is constructed in honour of Momine Khatun who was the wife of either Atabag Shamsaddin Eldegiz himself, or that of his son Jahan Pahlavan. The date, indicated on the walls, tells us that this ten-sided monument was constructed in 1186-1187 AD. The surface of each side is completely covered by the ornaments. In spite of the fact that the upper parts of this structure have some destruction, its height today is more than 25 meters. Here also exists an underground vault and a burial place or sardaba.

One of those creations of Ajami, which partially survived up to present day, is an architectural ensemble near the Momina Khatun Mausoleum. The main building had been destroyed some time ago, only two minarets and a portal connecting them have remained. This portal was constructed in 1187 AD. In the opinion of researchers, this composition of two minarets and a portal was originally planned and designed by Ajami.

The Khanaqah mausoleum in Nakhchivan strongly differs from what we already have described. While the Momina Khatun Mausoleum and other similar monuments are structures of a tower type, Khanagah mausoleum is a structure of the mixed type: its lower part has the cubic form and the upper part is eight-sided. Ornaments show that the mausoleum was made in 12-13th centuries.

=== Juma Mosque ===
Juma Mosque is one of monumental constructions of the Atabegs’ Architectural Complex in Nakhchivan. The architectural monument demolished in the 20th century is documented in images and photos from the 19th century.

== Legacy ==
The station "Memar Ajami" in Baku metropolitan was named in honor of him.
