= Khanegah tomb =

Coordinates: 39°11′20″N 45°42′56″E

- Xanəgah türbəsi
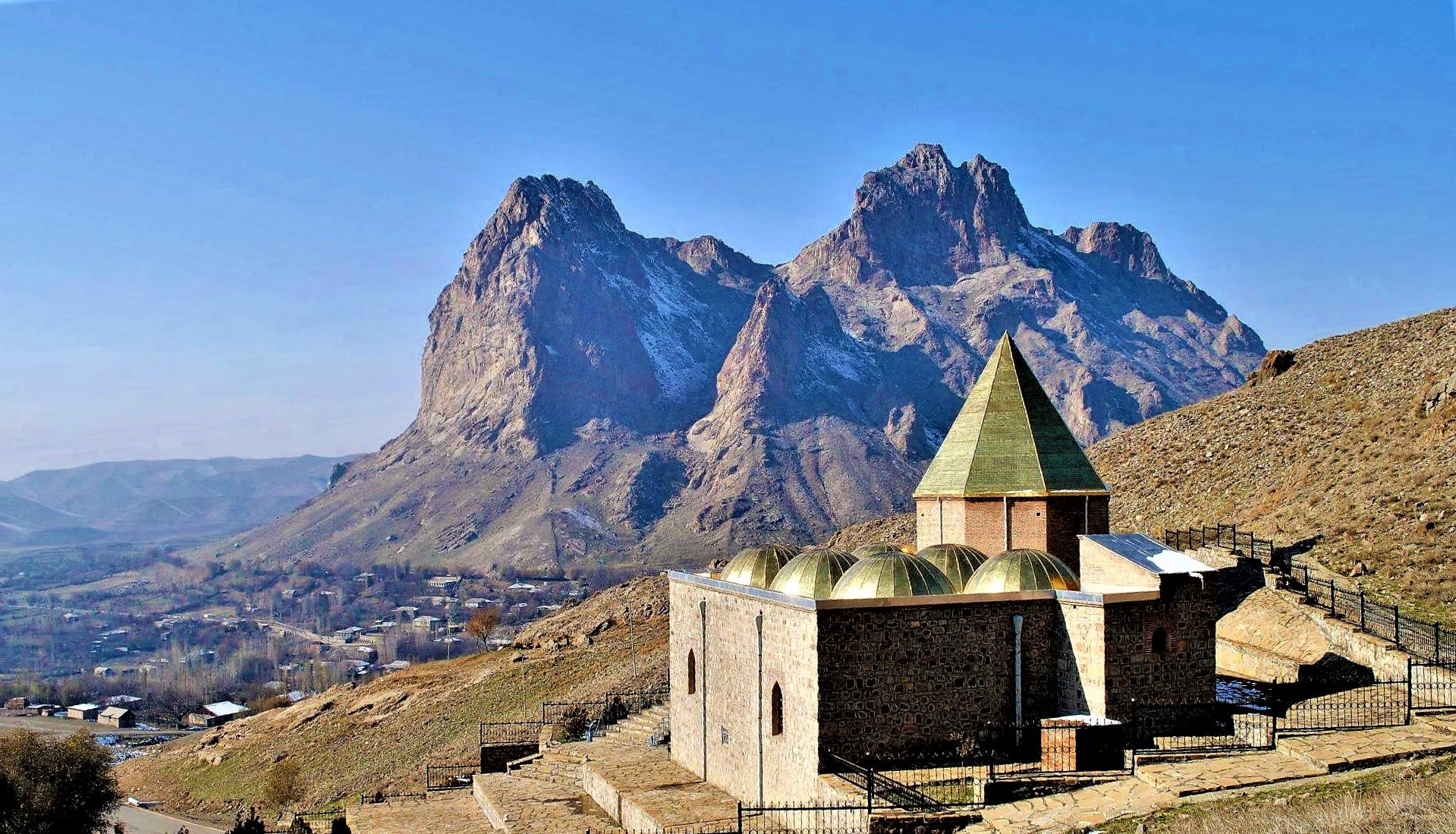
- Interactive map of Khanegah tomb
- Location: Julfa District, Azerbaijan
- Type: Mausoleum
- Completion date: 13th to 15th centuries

Khanegah on the Alinja River (Azerbaijani: Xanəgah türbəsi) – is a tomb dated to between the 13th and 15th centuries and is located in the Khanegah village of Julfa District, Azerbaijan. The tomb is on the Alinja River.

== Architecture ==
Khanegah was built of burned brick of 20 x 20 x 5 metre size. Pendentive of the building is built like muqarnas. The complex consists of two mausoleums: one of them was attached to the other in the 15th century.

== Gallery ==
In 2008, a postage stamp of Azerbaijan with the picture of the khanegah was released.

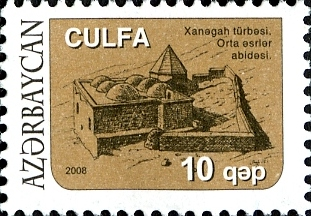
Postage stamp of Azerbaijan with the picture of the khanegah.
