= Seljuk architecture =

Seljuk architecture may refer to:

- Great Seljuk architecture (11th–12th centuries, mostly in Iran, Central Asia, and nearby regions)
- Anatolian Seljuk architecture (11th–13th centuries, mostly in Turkey)
