= Palace of Nakhchivan Khans =

- Azerbaijani: Naxçıvan xanlarının sarayı Persian: کاخ خان‌های نخجوان
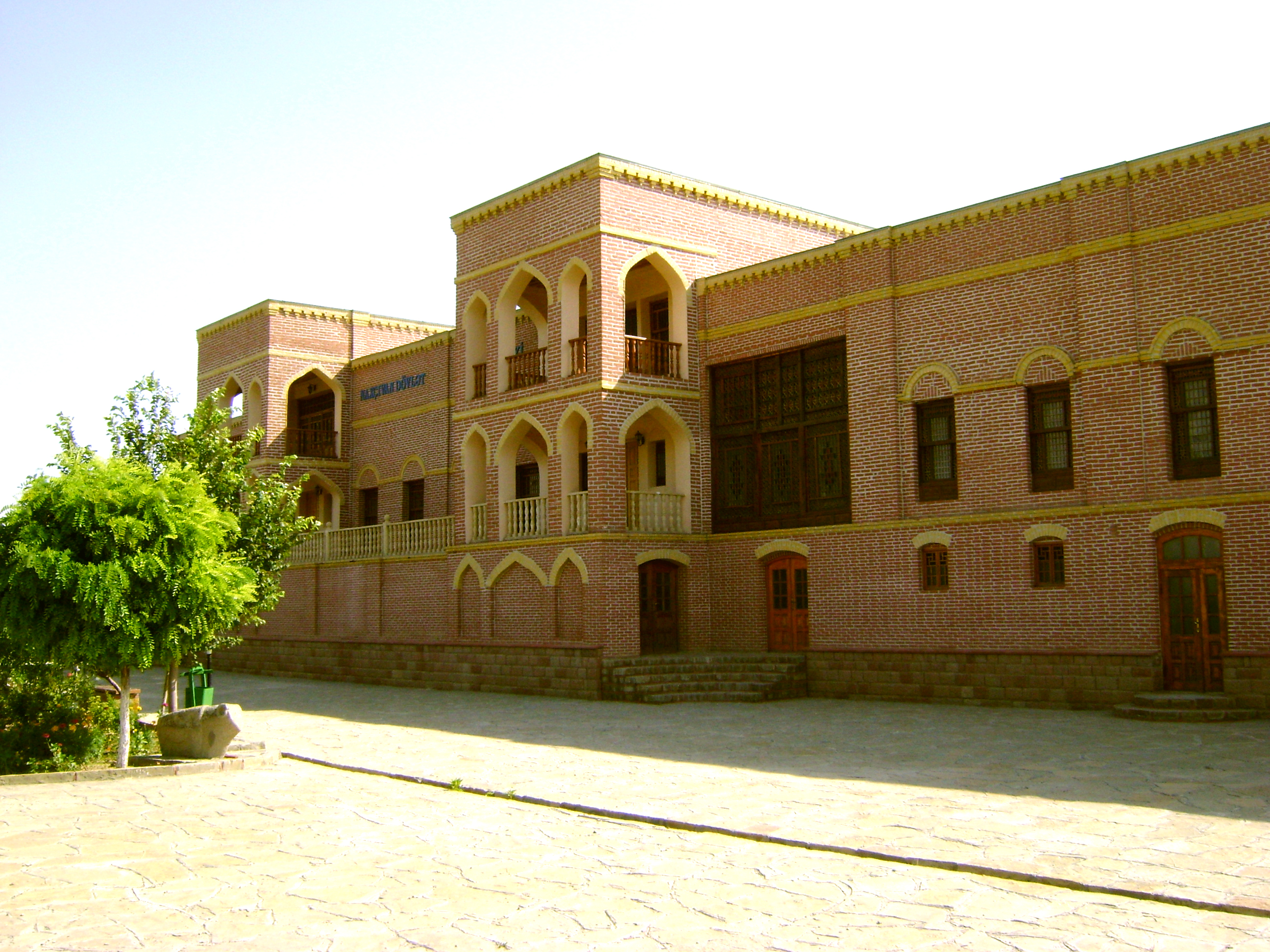

- Location within Azerbaijan

General information
- Type: Palace
- Architectural style: Architectural school of Nakhchivan
- Location: Ajami seyrangah, Nakhchivan, Nakhchivan Autonomous Republic, Azerbaijan
- Coordinates: 39.205288°N 45.405717°E
- Completed: XVIII century

Palace of Nakhchivan Khans (Azerbaijani: Naxçıvan xanlarının sarayı; Persian: کاخ خان‌های نخجوان) is historical and architectural monument of the 18th century located in Nakhchivan. The monument built in the style of the Nakhchivan-Maragha architectural school was the residence of the Nakhchivan khans before the early 20th century. At the end of the 18th century, the palace was built with the order of Nakhchivan khan, Ehsan Khan’s father Kelbali Khan Kangarli. The Khan Palace has been operating since April 1998 as Nakhchivan Carpet Museum.

== Design ==
The Khan Palace is built on the western side of the palace complex with a 3600 m^{2} area, facing daylight as khan steep. The Khan Palace complex features a 42 x 8 m building, a newly built swimming pool, water well, green stripes, ornamental and fruit trees. The building is two floors. By the time the palace consisted of two separate sections. The southern section is intended for administrative work and reception of high-class guests, while the northern section is intended for khan's family. Entrance to sections was one of the corridors with two-storeyed balconies. Currently, only southern corridor is used because of the museum's location in the palace. An internal passage was created between the sections. The corridors go above the main façade. The stairs are surrounded by bricks and are fixed with wooden railings.

The total area of the Khan Palace is 382 m^{2} and thickness of its walls vary from 60 cm to 1.1 m. The building was built with baked bricks of 20x20x5 cm. The windows have network styles and all rooms have all sizes of niches Nakhchivan residential houses used. There are 3 rooms on the 1st floor, 8 rooms (2 halls) on 2nd floor and 2 attics on the ornaments that are used as rooms. Both mansions have access to open balconies over the corridors. In the western part of the hall designed for guests, a 40 cm height stage type couch was built. The open windows of the wooden beam are decorated with nets and ceilings with small mirrors. Other walls of the hall have been designed with trunks, fountain and plot illustrations. In the course of many repairs and restoration works, the paintings were damaged or covered with plaster. The southern wall and its surroundings are decorated with geometrical shapes and mirror pieces. The building was warmed by two steamers placed on the walls.

== Activity ==
After the Nakhichevan Khanate was abolished, the Kangarli cavalry commander was placed in this palace, and the headquarters of the Nakhchivan National Defense Council moved here in 1918–1920. Khan's palace has been preserved in various periods, although it has been preserved.

The Khan Palace has been operating since April 1998 as the Nakhchivan Carpet Museum. The museum consists of 8 halls, one of which is dedicated to Nakhchivan khans. At the time of creation 359 exhibits were registered in the museum, but now their number exceeds 2,000 (305 carpets). Here are samples of all types of carpets (xovlu: gaba, zili and xovsuz: sumax, varni, rug, palaz, shadda, cecim, etc.) and carpet products (mufrash, heybat, khurcun, sack, orkan, etc.) is displayed. The carpet samples of the 18th to 19th centuries are stored in the Ganja-Gazakh, Guba-Shirvan, Garabagh, Tabriz-Nakhchivan carpet-weaving schools. According to the flavorings, "Gull Chichi", "Pirabadil", "Alpan", "Ancient Afshan", "Hunting", "Zili", "Old Buta", "Nakhchivan", "Gasimushagi" along with carpets, carved carpets, national carpet (national artist K. Aliyev), "Leyli and Majnun", "Karabakh landscape", "Gray wolves", "Ganja gozal" and others were portrayed by the Heydar Aliyev also occupies an important place. The museum houses household items – copper samples, pottery and porcelain containers, antique men's and women's national costumes.

== The subsidiary building of the Khan palace ==
The historic-architectural monument about 18 century, Nakhchivan c. The subsidiary building of the Khan Palace. The building is situated in the area opposing with the Khan Palace (Nakhchivan State Carpet Museum) at 50-60 m distance from Momuna khatun tomb, in the old Gala (fortress) str. This building belonging to 18 century houses consists of a luxurious entranced portal and subsidiary rooms built close to it. The entrance to the yard of the khan house passes from the vestibule covered with a spherical dome. The passage to the main vestibule of the dome is a portal completed with trombial order. In all four recesses of the vestibule there are places of doors. One of these doors opens to the yard of the palace, but the other two open to the subsidiary rooms situated on the right and left of the vestibule. The roofs of the rooms are joined-span formed. In the past these rooms were used as homes for the palace servants, food storehouse and as a kitchen. The total area of the building is 336 m2. The height of the subsidiary rooms is 2,5 m from outside street, inside height 3 m, the height of the entrance portal 4,5 m. The building was built of brick and lime materials. At present the administrative building of the Under Open Air Museum and a shop of pres.

== Gallery ==
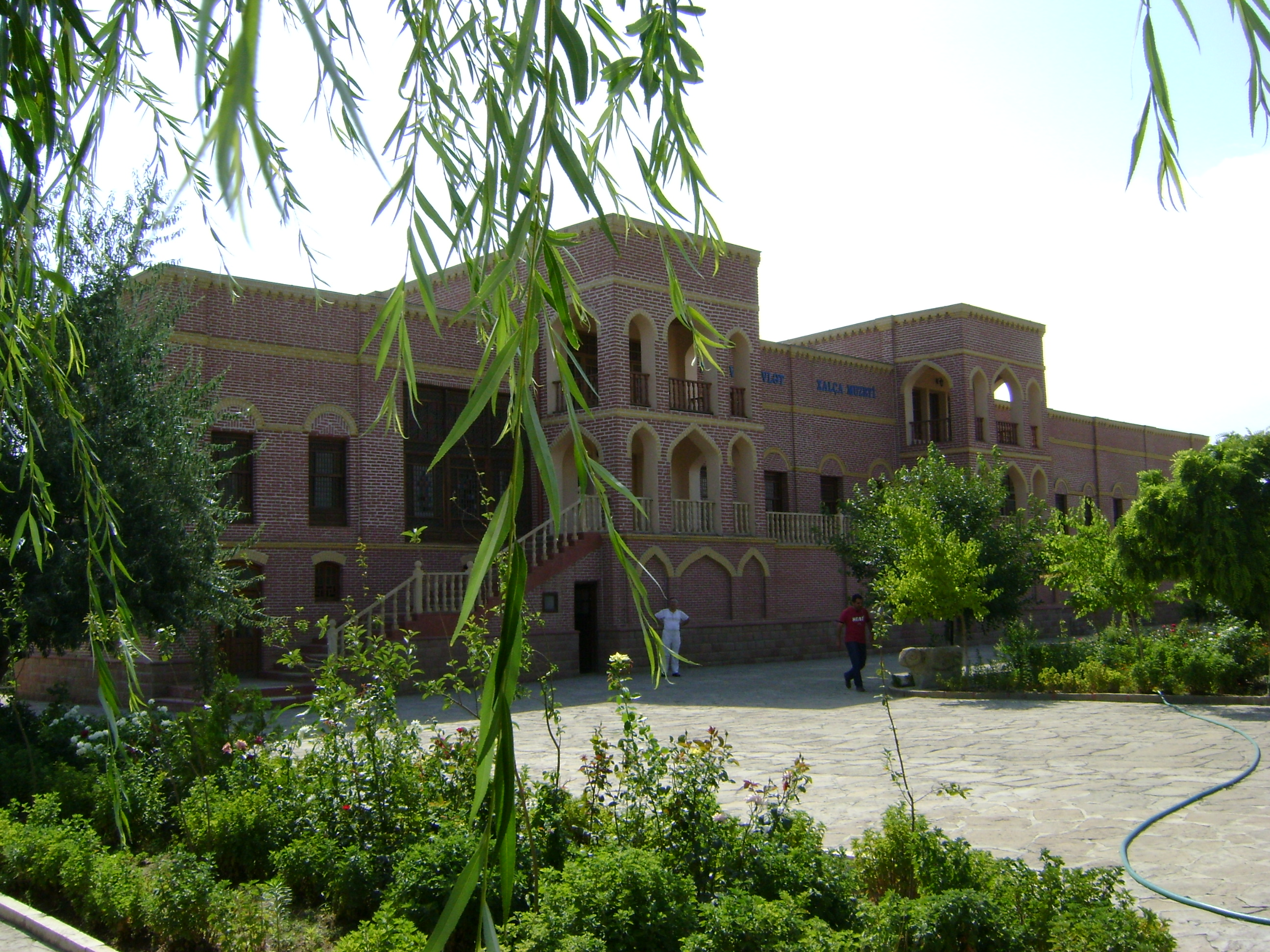

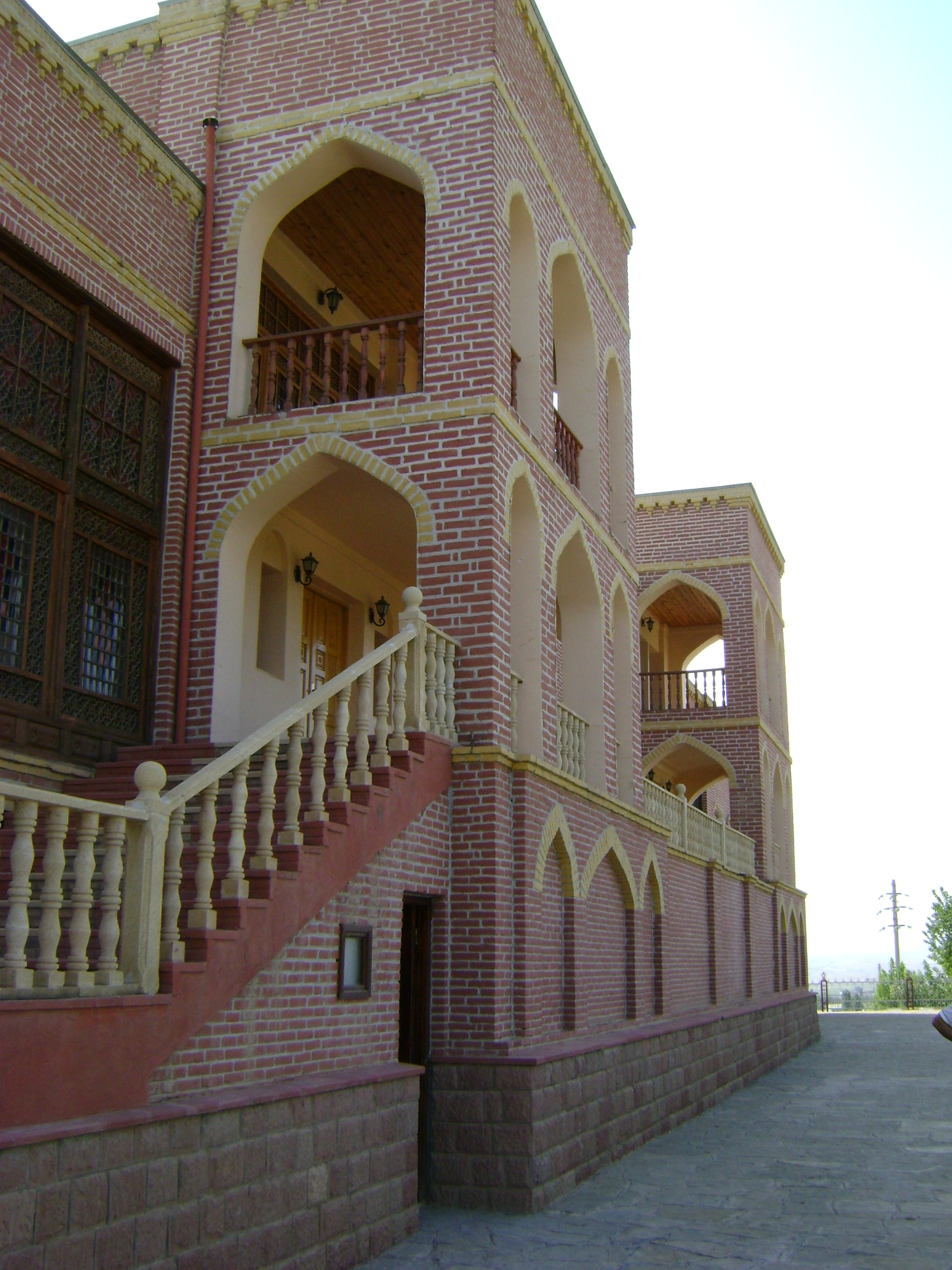

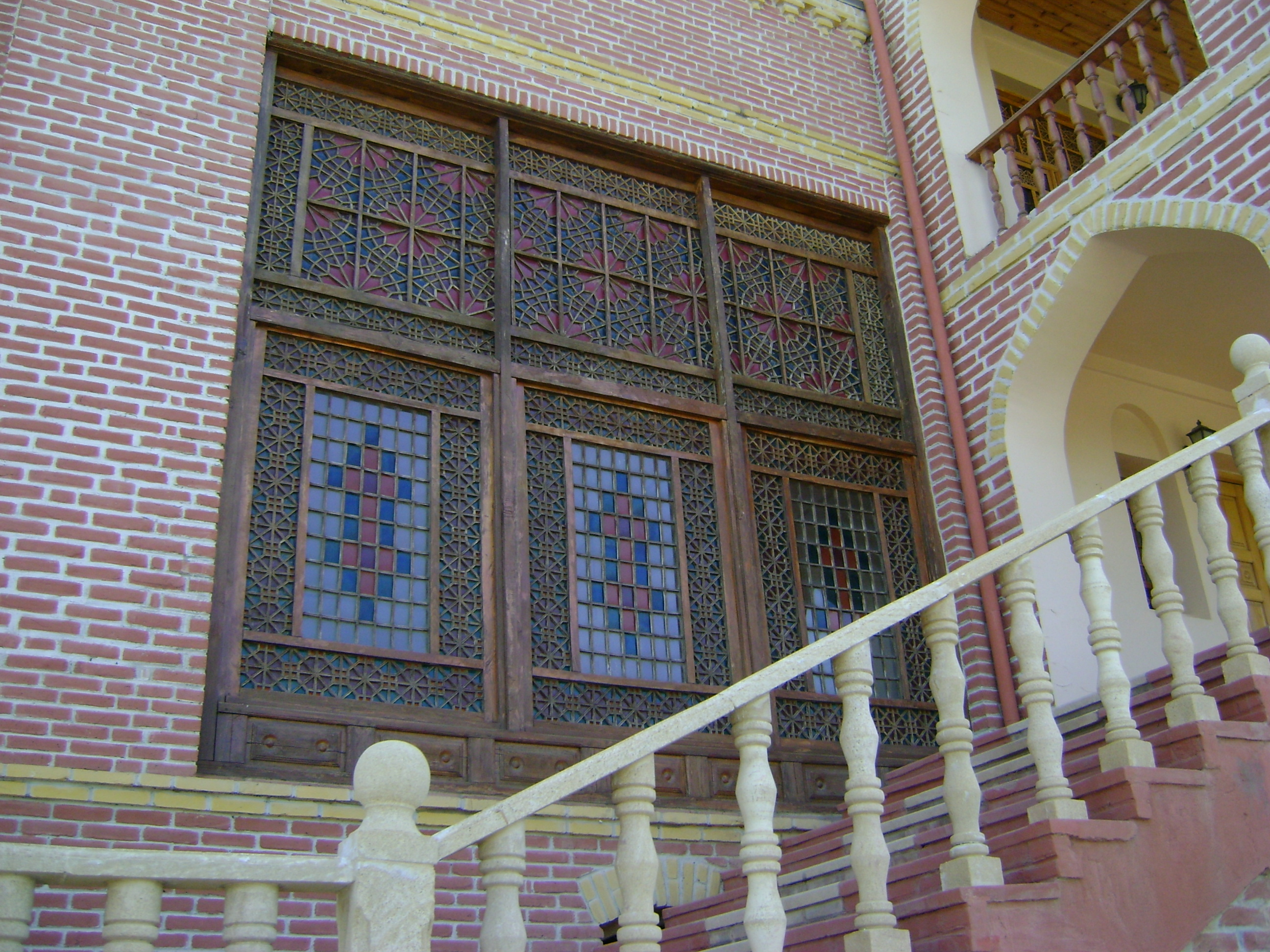

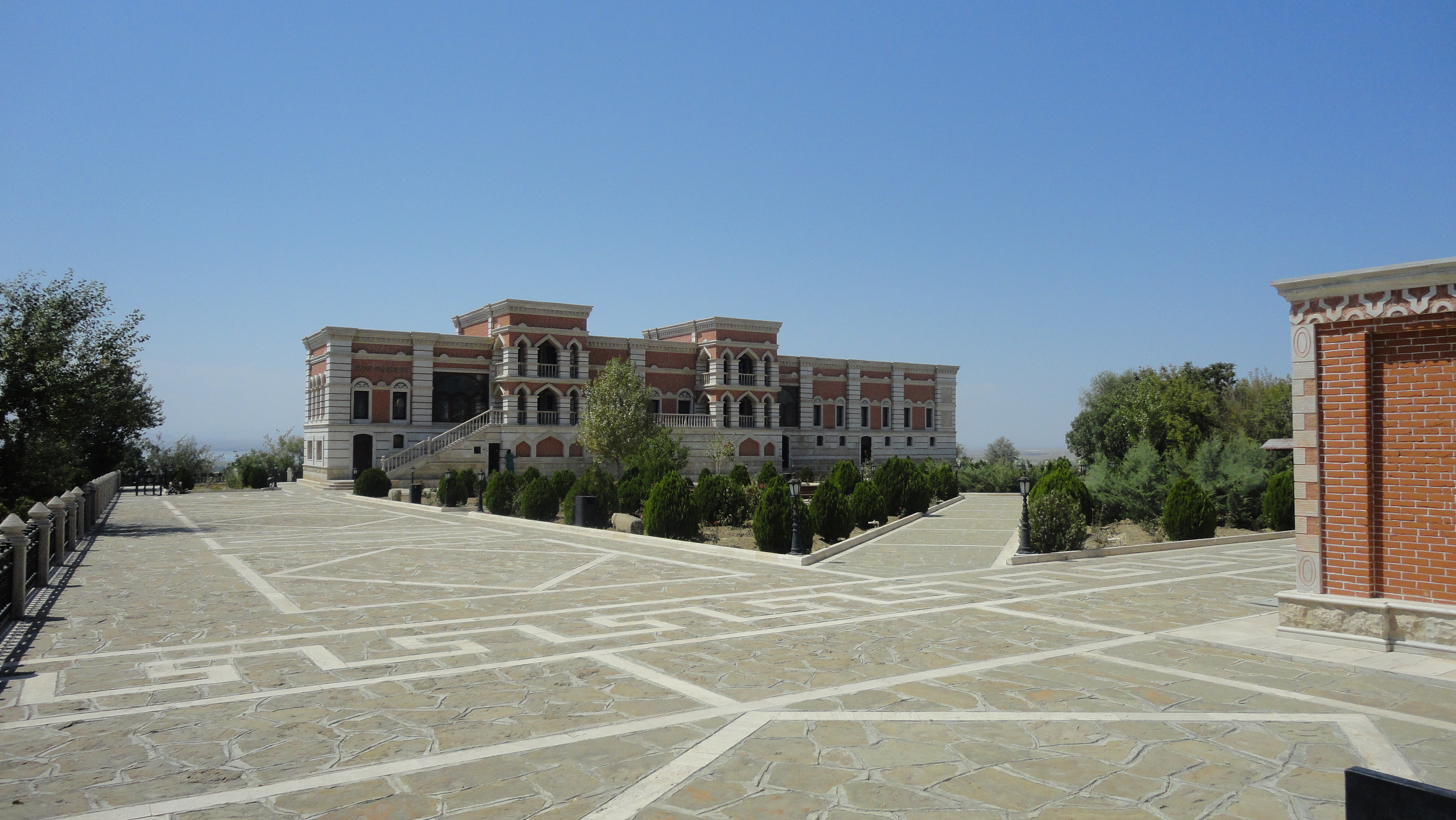

== See also ==
- Architecture of Azerbaijan
