= Architectural school of Nakhchivan =

Architectural school

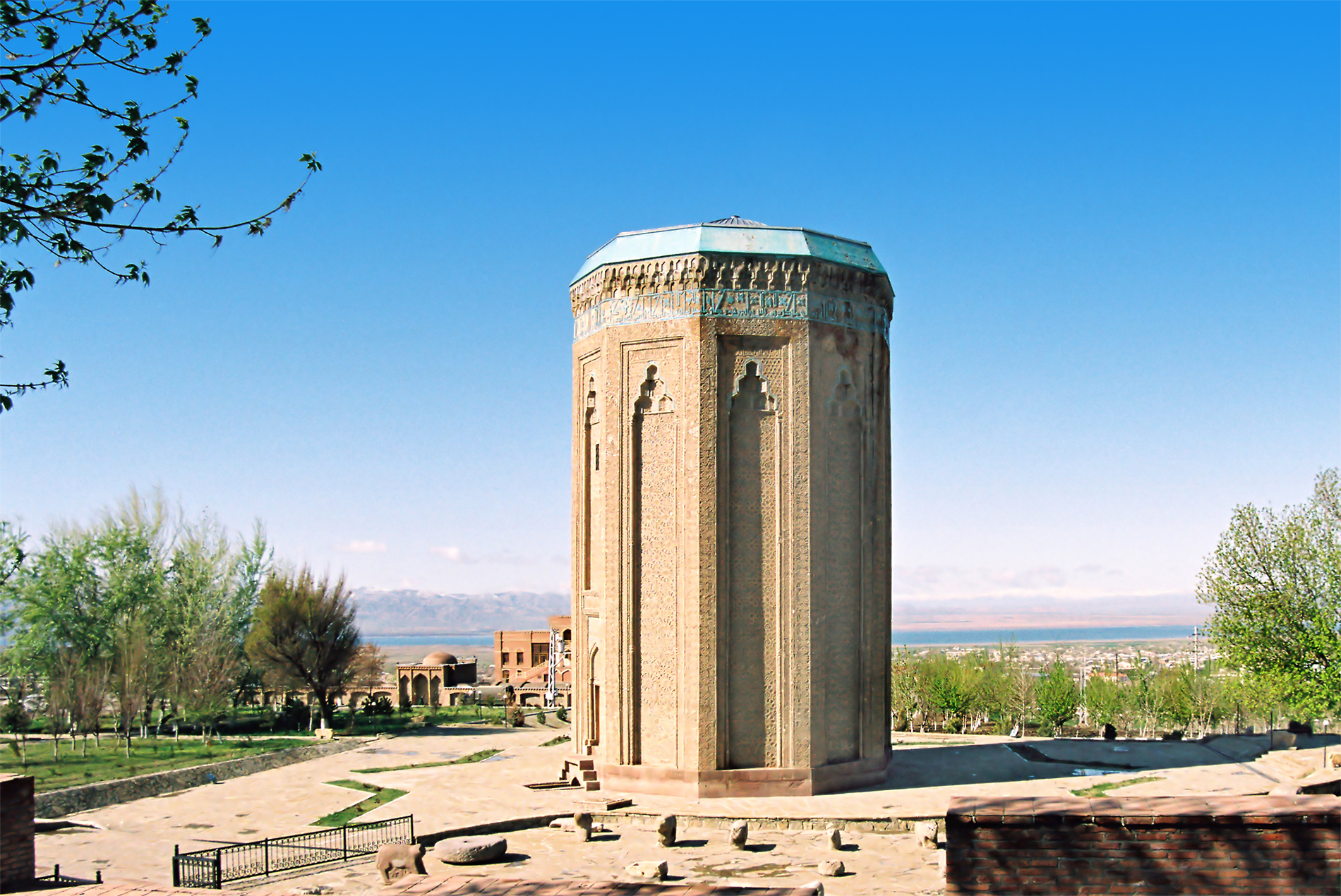
Momine Khatun Mausoleum, classical example of Nakhchivan architectural school

The architectural school of Nakhchivan (Azerbaijani: Naxçıvan memarlıq məktəbi) is one of the architectural schools developed in the Middle Ages in what is modern Azerbaijan. It was founded by Ajami Nakhchivani in the 12th century. The mausoleums of Yusif ibn Kuseyir from 1162 and Momine Khatun from 1186, designed by him in Nakhchivan, are classic examples of the associated architectural style.

== History ==
Small feudal states emerged in the territory of modern Azerbaijan because of weakening of the Caliphate. At that time, in such cities as Barda, Shamakhi, Beylagan, Ganja, Nakhchivan and others different architectural schools were founded, which shared a general similarity of architectural style.

The first dated monuments of the Nakhchivan School belong to the 12th century. Most famous among them were tower-shaped mausoleums and other memorial constructions erected for glorification of the wealth and power of feudal nobility. The architects of the school also erected mosques, palaces, caravansaries, bridges, castles towers, religious schools, homes, and bath-houses.

A new wave of construction began in the latter 17th century throughout places including Nakhchivan, Ordubad and Julfa. According to Turkish historian Ovliya Chalabi, in the 17th century there were 20 thousand houses, 70 religious structures, 20 caravansaries, 7 bathhouses and markets in Nakhchivan. Notable projects from this later era include the Imamzadeh complex (16–18th century), Ismayil Khan's bath (18–19th century), and the Palace of Nakhchivan Khans (18th century).

In recent years there have been increasing efforts to preserve this architectural heritage. There were 1,200 registered architectural monuments listed during 2006–2012.

== Characteristics ==
The tower-mausoleums in Azerbaijan, unlike those in the southern parts of Iran and some regions of Middle Asia, feature a many-sided tower and cruciform underground mausoleum. The subterranean burial vaults characteristically have a low and smooth arch. The interior of the towers are open, capped with a high conical or pyramidal cupola.

The Architectural school of Nakhchivan applied deep mathematical knowledge to their works. Projects featured precise construction and application of sophisticated geometry in plan and ornament. Characteristic materials include local stone as well as red and violet brick, as seen in the Imamzadeh complex. Also common are architectural ornaments of colorful tassels and ghost elements.

== See also ==
- Architecture of Azerbaijan
