= Gürcülü =

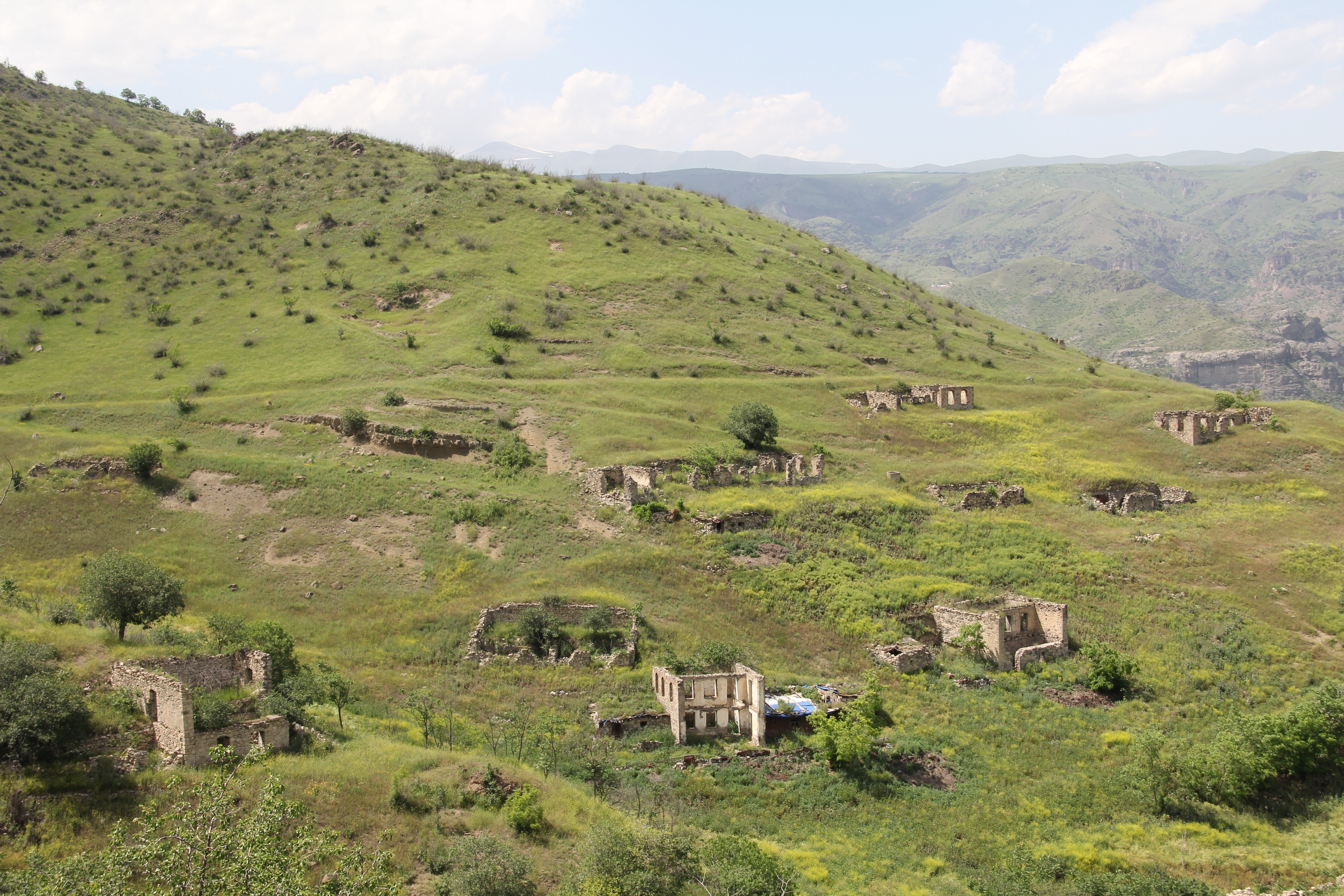

- Location within Azerbaijan
- Coordinates: 39°25′36″N 46°27′54″E
- Country: Azerbaijan
- District: Qubadli
- Time zone: UTC+4 (AZT)
  - Summer (DST): UTC+5 (AZT)

Gürcülü (Gurjulu) is a village in the Qubadli District of Azerbaijan.
