= Momine Khatun Mausoleum =

- Möminə Xatun türbəsi (Azerbaijani); آرامگاه مومنه خاتون (Persian)
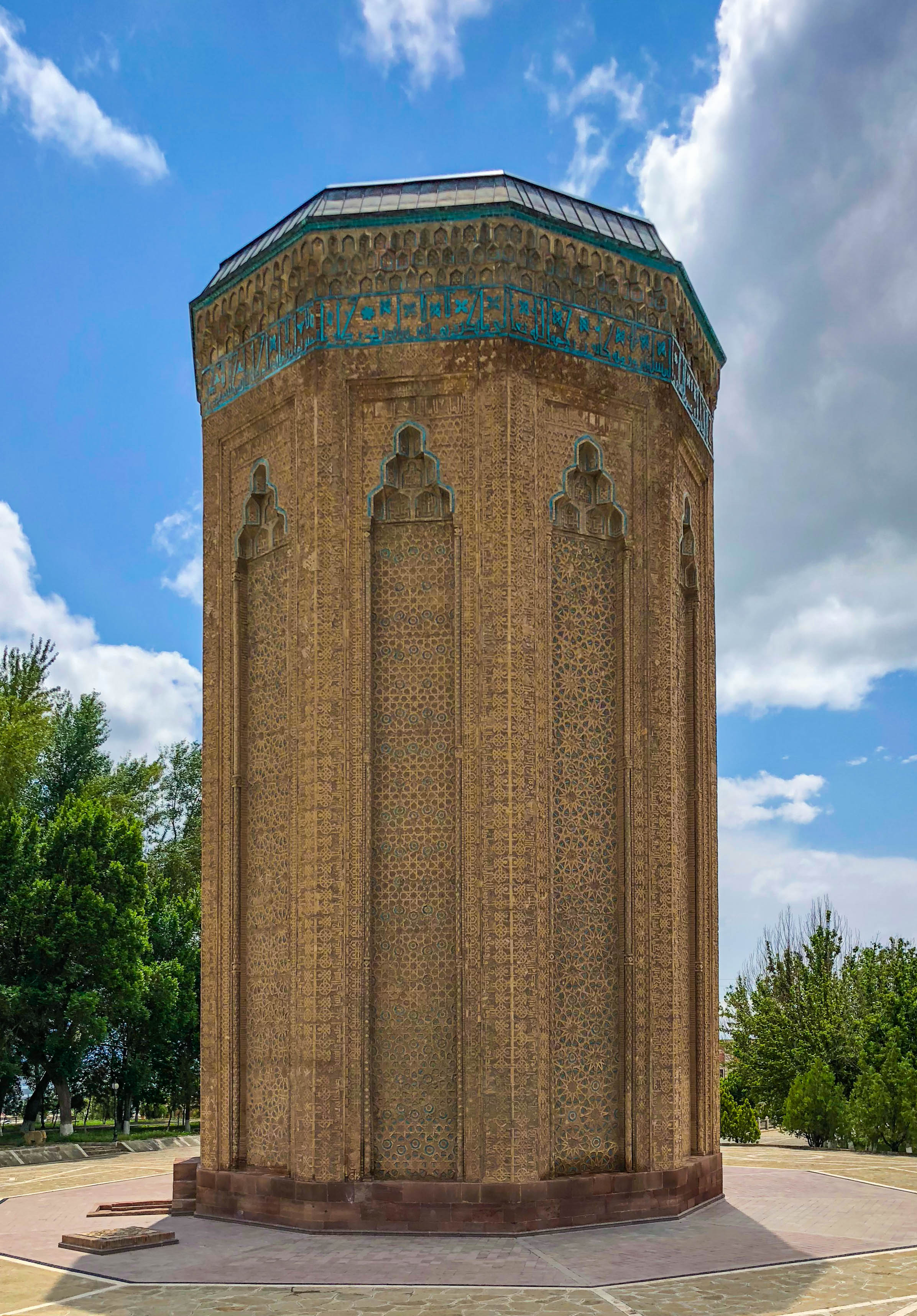

- Location within Azerbaijan
- Location: Nakhchivan, Azerbaijan

History
- Built for: Momine Khatun

Site notes
- Architect: Ajami Nakhchivani
- Architectural style: Architectural school of Nakhchivan

Momine Khatun Mausoleum (Azerbaijani: Möminə Xatun türbəsi, Persian: آرامگاه مومنه خاتون) is a mausoleum, also known as the Atabek Dome, located in the city of Nakhchivan of the Nakhchivan Autonomous Republic in Azerbaijan. It was built in 1186 by the architect Ajami ibn Abubekr Nakhchivani. The ten-sided mausoleum reached a height of 34 meters. Today its height is only 25 meters (without the tent, which has not been preserved). The mausoleum, built and named after the mother of one of the local rulers of Azerbaijan, Atabek Jahan Pahlavan of Ildegezid dynasty, is masterfully decorated with complex geometric ornaments and inscriptions from Koran.

Although the original height of the tomb, built by the architect Ajami Nakhchivani in 1186, was 34 meters, its tent-shaped dome is not completed nowadays; therefore, the tomb has a height of 25 meters (without the hipped dome). The grave of Momina Khatun is the only monument from the Atabaylar architectural complex that has survived to nowadays.

The general structure of Momina Khatun tomb consists of a crypt and an 10-sided tower. The mausoleum is also 10-sided in plan. Aside from the crypt and appearance, Ajami avoided complexity in the interior of the tower and favored quantity and integrity. The low platform of the tomb has a decagonal shape and is covered with large polished diorite slabs.

So as not to spoil the purity and geometric simplicity of the tower's prismatic structure, the architect did not differentiate the eastern side with its double-doored entrance from any of the other walls. The rectangular entrance door to the tower is built into a shallow lancet arch above which is a brick inscription in Kufic lines.

== History ==
The mausoleum on the grave of Momina Khatun was raised immediately after her burial. Initially, the mausoleum was a modest building, and it was only shortly before her death that Atabeg Jahan Pahlavan of the Eldiguzids decided to perpetuate the memory of his mother with a more solid structure. In connection with this, he ordered the construction of a complex of grandiose structures, ordering the construction of a new mausoleum to Ajami ibn Abubekr Nakhchivani, already known by that time for the construction of the mausoleum of Yusuf ibn Kuseyir. Under Jahan Pahlavan, the mausoleum of Momina Khatun, known as “Gumbez Atabek”, was built. The rest of the buildings of the complex were built later, when the youngest son of Momina Khatun Kyzyl-Arslan was atabeg.

== Description ==
The project of the complex consisted of several structures. In addition to the mausoleum itself and to the portal with minarets, back in the 19th century, the Juma mosque towered here, at 35–36 meters high, surpassing even the Momina Khatun mausoleum. Of all these structures, only the mausoleum of Momina Khatun has survived to the present day. It consists of the ground floor and an underground level. The tomb of Momina Khatun is located in the underground level, where there is no pedestrian access. The above-ground part is made of fired brick and has ten sides. It belongs to the central-dome structures of the tower type, and rises on a massive plinth lined with three rows of red tufa.

The surface of each, niche-shaped side is completely covered with carvings, which are in Kufic Arabic script stylized into geometric ornament. On each side, this ornament is distinct. The upper part of the mausoleum is decorated with a composition resembling stalactites.

The inside of the mausoleum is round. The only decorations of its interior are 4 circular medallions covered with inscriptions and ornaments. The discs contain the names of Muhammad, Abu Bakr, Omar, Osman, Ali, Hasan and Huseyn.

The tomb has a 25-meter octagonal shape, which stands out among the buildings included in the Atabeylar architectural complex. Paintings and photographs from the 19th and early 20th centuries confirm that it was once part of a large group. The tomb was built on a plinth covered with red diorite stones.

=== Crypt ===
The tomb of Momina Khatun differs in plan from her predecessor's in size and complexity. The mausoleum is octagonal in shape. An arch about ten meters high could not be covered with a flat brick dome. For this reason, Ajami paid special attention to the strength of the lower layer and developed a constructive technique which had also been used in the tomb of the Red Dome 38 years earlier: he placed a thick, ten-sided support in the middle of the tomb. Since the sides of the support are connected to the sides by pointed arches, a mushroom-shaped solid central pillar and stable roof structure were created.

To further enhance the beauty of the mushroom support and the processing effect, the architect inserted brick ribs onto the opposite corners. These ribs form a star-shaped frame. According to Jafar Giyasi, this frame is also similar to the patterned structures decorating the monument and is based on principles of mathematical harmony. The architectonic beauty of the structure is more clearly realized, as the frames are lined with patterned brickwork.

Prof. Jafar Giyasi notes that the process of evolution of construction based on local traditions ends in the architecture of the Momina Khatun tomb. According to the researcher, the fastest stage of this process falls on the period of the Atabeg's reign and follows the line from the red-domed tomb to the Gilan tomb, to the Momina Khatun tomb. This was the peak of scientific and artistic progress of that period in the history of Azerbaijan.

Ajami's design for the mausoleum combined architectural and engineering elements. The monument's construction system, particularly the design and assembly of the tomb, has been cited as evidence of his technical expertise. A source describes him as the "chief engineer" of his time.

=== Tower ===
The tower's shape of the mausoleum is octagonal on the outside and round on the inside. Studies have shown that the choice of a decagonal layout is not by chance. The planning-spatial structure of the Mumunakhat tomb is generally built according to the decimal principle. This is the basis of the golden division, which creates greater proportion and harmony.

Aside from the crypt and appearance, Ajami avoided complexity in the interior of the tower and prioritized quantity and integrity. The high cylindrical capacity of the inner space is covered by a spherical dome. Its curved surfaces show traces of a spiral staircase leading to a chimney in the dome. This shows that in the tomb of Momina Khatun an open staircase was built to climb into the space between the domes, in contrast to the one in the tombs of Kharragan. Possibly, plastered segments in the cylindrical part of the interior were decorated with wall paintings. In the interior, under the plaster of the last period, a dark strip for writing appears, which suggests that earlier there were some decorative works on its wall surfaces.

The low platform of the tomb has a decagonal shape and is covered with large polished diorite slabs. Above it rises a high brick volume of a domed tower. The current height of the tomb, with the upper pyramidal cover of which had been demolished, is about 25 meters. Originally, its height was of 35 meters.

While Ajami used an octahedral body, widespread in the architectural practice of that time, in the tomb he raised for Yusif ibn Kuseyir, he chose a rare 10-sided prism for Momina Khatun's mausoleum. A similar form is Gombede-Kavus in Gurgan (1006), which divided its very high cylindrical mass into 10 rib verticals. In a tomb with a round dome, built in Maragha 10 years before the tomb of Momina Khatun, the interior has a decagonal shape.

Ajami achieved a strong compositional verticality and wide planning possibilities, making the outer volume of the tomb decagonal. The architect reinforced the upward orientation with other techniques, the corner supports were thick and conspicuous, and the cornices on the edges were narrow, deep and very high. Completing it with a pointed stalactite structure gave these crowns a more dynamic and graceful form. Their vertical rhythm creates a strong vertical movement of the tomb's body. That is why the monument looks taller, thinner and more majestic than it really is.

Raising the body on a prismatic pedestal, thus complicating the finish of the inflated pyramidal dome, greatly facilitated the ascent of artistic architectural forms. At the same time, artistic sophistication in all architectural details of the tower was based on constructive logic. The underground vault, which is an excellent architectural, spatial and engineering solution, played a fundamental role in ensuring the stability of the entire monument as a solid foundation. The massiveness of the general engineering solution of the tomb is completed by a frame structure created by a high-body tin and a two-layer domed coating (internally spherical, externally pyramidal).

=== Facade ===
In order to keep the pure geometric beauty of the tower-like prismatic volume of the tomb, the architect did not sharply separate the eastern face with the front door from the other faces with special facade decorations. The rectangular entrance door of the tower is built into a shallow lancet arch, above it is a brick with the inscription "Banna Ajami Abu Akr ogly" in Kufic lines. The date of construction of the mausoleum is written with the same line in a rectangular frame connecting the stones above into the composition of the SAI portal that includes them.

The sides of the lancet arches are decorated with graceful columns (diameter 15 cm), the top is covered with large honeycomb eyes, and the inner surfaces are covered with complex geometric patterns that do not repeat each other. These types of patterns, which give the surfaces a high aesthetic appearance, are connected through the beauty of straight lines, the principles of overall geometric harmony, the fullness of meaning and structure. Therefore, a variety of patterned compositions increases the variability and dynamics of the monument's meeting, without violating the spatial integrity.

Bright blue-turquoise tiles used in the patterns of lancet arches on the edges form spectacular accents and joints against the background of the general reddish color of burnt brick. These accents facilitate the perception of complex patterns, enrich the color resolution, and add subtlety and visual depth to the crown surfaces.

=== Facade elements of Momina Khatun tomb ===
The projecting elements of the ten-sided structure join at the top, forming U-shaped frames around the pointed crowns on its façades. Ajami decorated the frames with Kufic inscriptions. The vertical strokes of the angular letters interlace, while the brick background features vegetal patterns. Aleskerzade interpreted the inscriptions as the text of Surah Ya-Sin running around all ten faces of the mausoleum. In this reading, the surah appears twice: first across faces one to five, and then across faces six to ten. On each face, the inscription begins at the lower right, proceeds upward, continues horizontally along the top, and then descends on the left.

Another belt with inscriptions connects, at the very top, the faces bordered by Surah Yasin. This is the main epitaph, pointing to the patron of the mausoleum in whose memory it was built. This epitaph stands out among others either by its place in the real composition of the monument, or by the large size of the letters (the height of the belt is 98 cm), or by the material and color, the superiority of the position was emphasized by all means.

The inscriptions' location are the common-burnt bricks, which are somewhat sparsely intertwined. Against this reddish background, the shiny and hatched shapes of the large blue marble letters are more visible. Both the sparse brickwork and the size and blueness of the letters are designed to make the writing belt easy seen from the distance.

=== Interior ===
There are four circular medallions on the perpendicular arrows (diameter 1.5 m) in the interior of the dome's brick rows. The ornaments were made of the mix of gypsum and clay and consist of Kufi-style compositions. The essence of all the compositions is the word "Allah". Omar, Osman, Ali words intersect with each other, forming 6, 8 and 10 pointed stars and surround the word “Allah”.

== Gallery ==
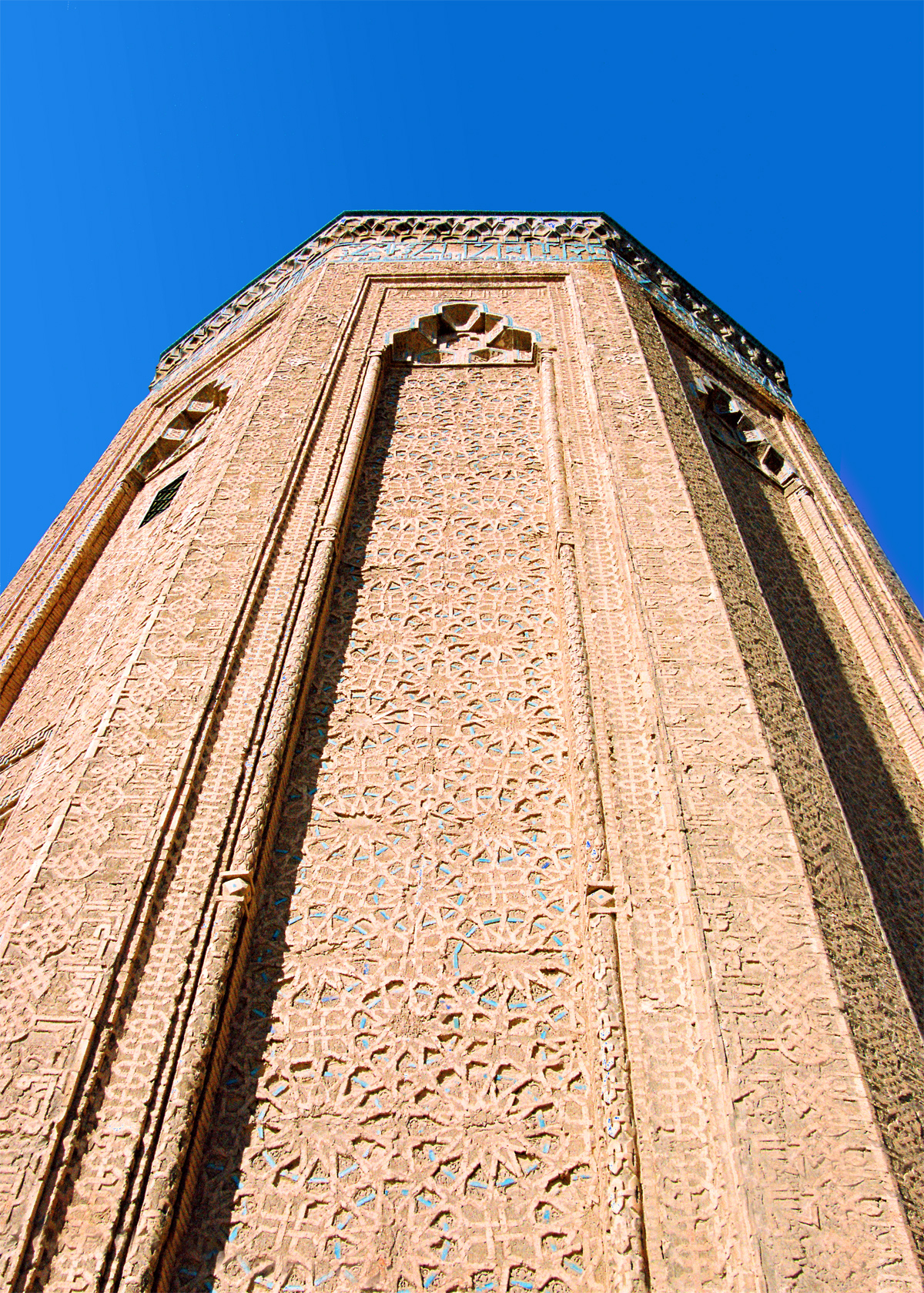

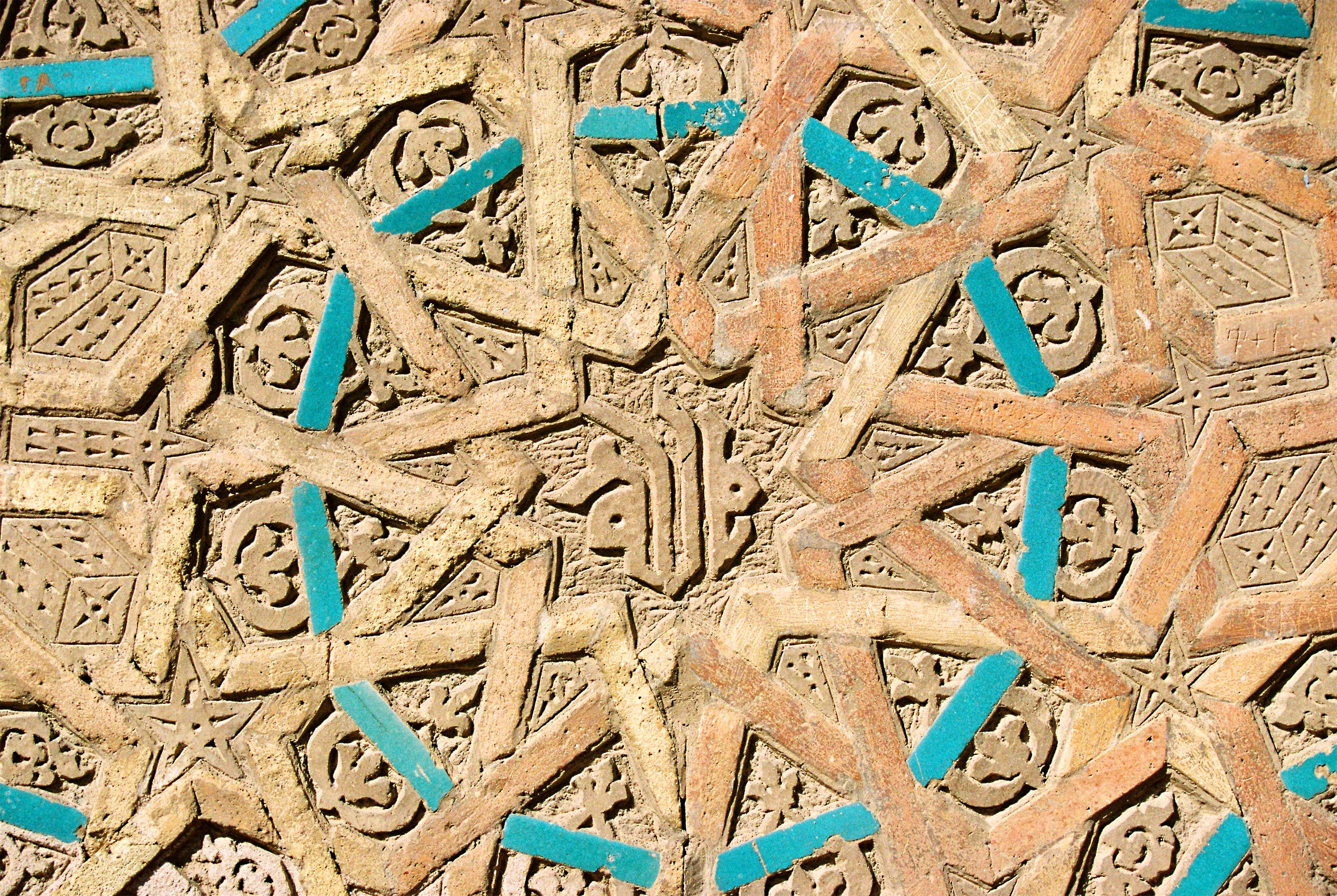

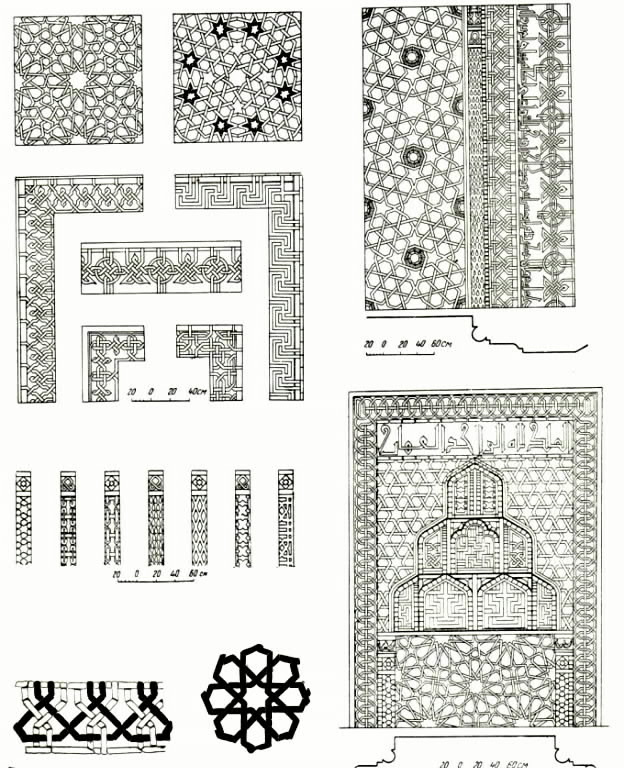

== See also ==
- List of mausolea § Azerbaijan
