= Nakhchivan State Museum of History =

- Azerbaijani: Naxçıvan Dövlət Tarix Muzeyi
- Location within Azerbaijan
- Established: 1924; 102 years ago
- Location: Nakhchivan, Nakhchivan Autonomous Republic, Azerbaijan
- Coordinates: 39.211512°N 45.412237°E
- Type: History, archaeology, ethnography
- Collection size: 48000+
- Director: Nizami Rahimov

The Nakhchivan State Museum of History (Azerbaijani: Naxçıvan Dövlət Tarix Muzeyi) is a museum of history of Nakhchivan, established in 1924. The museum is located on Istiglal Street in the city of Nakhchivan, Nakhchivan Autonomous Republic.

== History ==
Nakhchivan State Museum of History was opened in 1924. The museum was established as a historical-ethnographic museum, originally. In later years, the museum was named as Museum of History and Country Lore. In 1968 the museum obtained the status of State Museum.
