= Imamzadeh complex in Nakhchivan =

Imamzadeh complex
- İmamzadə kompleksi مجموعه امامزاده
- Interactive map of Imamzadeh complex
- Location: Nakhchivan, Azerbaijan
- Coordinates: 39.1120°N 45.4696°E
- Type: Mausoleum
- Beginning date: 1722
- Completion date: 1732

Imamzadeh (Azerbaijani: Naxçıvanın İmamzadə kompleksi, Persian: مجموعه امامزاده نخجوان) - is a complex in Nakhchivan (Azerbaijan), located nearer to other monuments of the city, on the coast of the Aras River.

== Architecture ==
Like many other monuments of Azerbaijan, Imamzadeh complex also was built in a manner of the 17th-18th centuries, peculiar to the period of the Safavids. The earliest burial vaults and mosques constructed near them are the main features of such complexes.

The square-shaped mausoleum reminding of a vault with a cupola and a tower-mausoleum is a kernel of Imamzadeh complex of Nakhchivan. A decorative solution of a cylindrical body is analogical to Barda Mausoleum (1322) built by Ahmad ibn Eyyub, an architect from Nakhchivan. According to an inscription fixed on the entrance of the mausoleum, its construction began in 1722 and finished in 1732.

The architectural monument in the SE of Nakhchivan c. Formed in 16–18 centuries. Consists of 3 rooms. The base of the complex in plan is square shaped, but the outer view consists of the composition that the round base coming from the cubic formed towered tombs joining (see Imamzadeh tomb). The building joining the tomb, a bit bigger and having an entrance door from the W forms the central part.

For the Russian scientist V.M. Sisoyev who was in Nakhchivan in 20 years of the last century, this part of the complex was considered the tomb of the Nakhchivani khans. For the witness of the scientist there was a grave of Mustafagulu khan Nakhchivanski, the dead son of Abbasgulu khan by hijri 1337 (1918). But from time to time, this and other graves were destroyed.

A bit far from the complex in the N direction there is another tomb. The tomb built of burnt bricks, from the down square shaped and in the upper part was built of multiangular shaped and its roof was covered with a dome. Compared with other constructions included in the complex, this tomb was in a good order. But having not any inscription or grave inside, its appointment was left uncertained. The buildings included in the Imamzadeh complex had harmony with one another and made a perfect architectural ensemble.

There was a cemetery about the Middle Ages around the complex. From time to time, some graves here were destroyed, but some others had been living up today. Grave inscriptions belonging to 16th century discovered from under the land had been investigated. Also, spanshed vaults built of burnt bricks were come across here. Later on, the place of the necropolis was changed and passed to the hill near the monument. Members of some mystic sects acting in the Middle Ages in this territory for a while had used of this complex to live, to pray, to resolve as a settlement. Generally, the characteristic features of this type constructions consist of: repairing the funeral buildings existed before, restoration and construction by means of reconstruction, and by means of building others - mosque, blessing and other service rooms close to the tomb and by this way to establish the religion complex. As in 17-18 centuries the members of mystic sects acting in our territory used the existing imamzadehs as places to live, to pray and to remember. That time there were not built settlements in the region. The architectural complex was capitally repaired and restored in 2004.
