= Yusif ibn Kuseyir Mausoleum =

Coordinates: 39°12′6.79″N 45°24′50″E

- Yusif Küseyir oğlu türbəsi
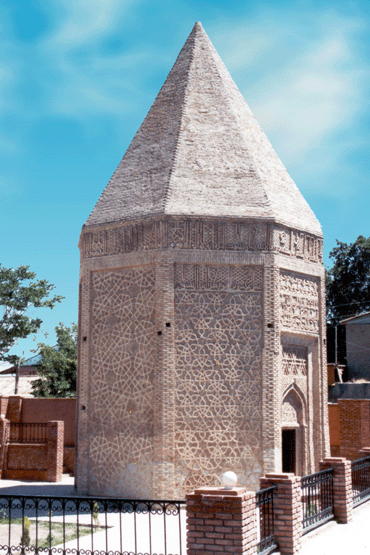
- Interactive map of Yusif ibn Kuseyir Mausoleum
- Location: Nakhchivan, Azerbaijan
- Designer: Ajami Nakhchivani
- Type: Mausoleum
- Beginning date: 1161–1162
- Dedicated to: Yusif ibn Kuseyir

The Mausoleum of Yusif ibn Kuseyir was built in 1161–1162, in Nakchivan city. Architect of the mausoleum was Ajami ibn Abubakr Nakhchivani.

The mausoleums of Nakhichevan was nominated for List of World Heritage Sites, UNESCO in 1998 by Gulnara Mehmandarova – president of Azerbaijan Committee of ICOMOS—International Council on Monuments and Sites.

== Architecture ==
This small octagonal building was constructed from baked brick and finished with a pyramid-shaped roof. There is a large line with ligature written in kufi script from Quran on the top of the mausoleum. The western edge of the mausoleum slightly differs. The top of the mausoleum is decorated with geometric ornaments, under which is located a construction ligature. It indicates the name of a buried person and the construction date of the mausoleum. Internal space of the mausoleum is vaulted and divided into cells. Ajami ibn Abubakr Nakhchivani's name is written on the upper side of the first edge, in the left side of the entrance.

== See also ==
- Garabaghlar Mausoleum
- Melik Ajdar Mausoleum
- Mausoleum of Sheikh Juneyd
