= Imamzadeh Mausoleum =

- Imamzadeh Mausoleum (Barda)
- Imamzadeh Mausoleum (Shamakhi)
- Imamzadeh Mausoleum (Nehram)
- Imamzadeh (Ganja)
