= Ahmad Nakhchivani =

Azerbaijani architect

Ahmad ibn Ayuub al-Hafiz Nakhchivani (Persian: احمد بن ایوب الحافظ نخجوانی) was a medieval architect. Ahmad Nakhchivani was the most eminent representative of Nakhchivan-Maragha architectural school and two buildings constructed by him are saved up to present days. One of these buildings is Barda Mausoleum (1322) and the other is Garabaghlar Mausoleum built in honour of Gudi khatun (1330s).

The architect wrote his name on violet enamel of a northern arch of Garabaghlar mausoleum. Compositional structure, fine ornaments, geometrical shape, multi-color enamels of the building and usage of ligatures as ornaments are typical features of Ahmad Nakchivani's architectural style. It is assumed that Akhsadan Baba Mausoleum of Barda was also built by Ahmad Nakhchivani, because the architecture of the building is typical to the architect's style.
