= Imamzadeh Mausoleum (Barda) =

Mausoleum in Barda, Azerbaijan

- Azerbaijani: İmamzadə türbəsi Persian: آرامگاه امامزاده
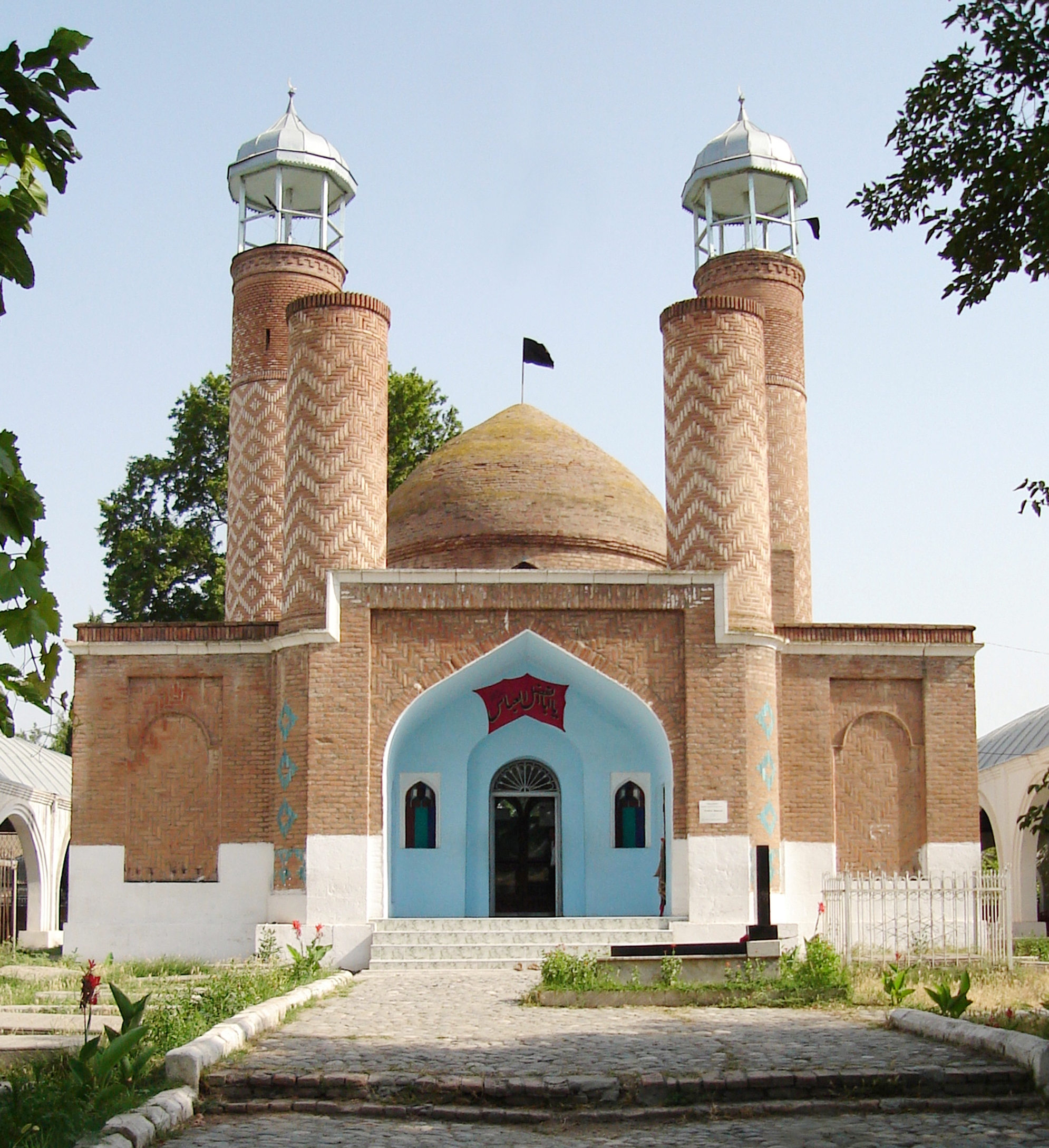
- The exterior of the mausoleum and mosque, in 2006

- Location of the mausoleum and mosque in Azerbaijan

Religion
- Affiliation: Islam
- Ecclesiastical or organisational status: Mausoleum (since 14th century); Mosque (since 18th century)

Location
- Location: Barda
- Country: Azerbaijan
- Coordinates: 40°20′N 47°10′E

Architecture
- Architect: Karbalayi Safikhan Karabakhi (1868)
- Style: Arran School of Architecture
- Completed: 14th century (mausoleum); 18th century (mosque)

Specifications
- Dome: One
- Minaret: Four
- Materials: Stone; brick; tiles

The Imamzadeh Mausoleum (Azerbaijani: İmamzadə türbəsi, Persian: آرامگاه امامزاده) is an Islamic monument which consists of a mausoleum and mosque, located in the center of Barda, Azerbaijan. The monument, which was the only building completed in Azerbaijan in the 14th century with four minarets, was in the form of a pilgrimage mausoleum, according to Dorn, an academic. A mosque was built around it in the 18th century. It is a holy site in Shia Islam.

== History ==
In 1841, Abbasqulu Agha Bakikhanov mentioned: "In many ways, the ruins of the village and the high-ranking three imamzadehs in the cities of Shamakhi, Ganja and Barda, Imamzadeh in the Bulbule village show that this country has always been the homeland of the religious elders". He also noted that the Barda mausoleum was a sacred place of pilgrimage

According to reports, the granddaughter of the 5th Imam of Ismaili and Jafari Shiite, Muhammad al-Baqir, was buried in the Barda mausoleum. Mohammed al-Baqir's third son, Ibrahim Isa, was buried in 739 in the Imamzadeh Complex near Ganja. The Barda monument is similar to the monument "Char Minar" in Bukhara. The fact that this place is a sanctuary also confirms that there is no mosque in Imamzadeh.

The figured layout of the bricks of the Imamzadeh mosque, the coordination of stone and brick used in construction, and the use of tiles, appear to be influenced by the Barda Mausoleum, that was built in 1322.

The Imamzadeh Mausoleum at Barda was rebuilt in 1868 by Karbalayi Safikhan Karabakhi, who was instrumental in the development of Karabakh architecture. Karabakhi linked the architectural elements of the eastern architecture with local traditions, especially in the mosques he built and restored, including the Imamzadeh Mosque in Barda (1868), Aghdam Mosque (1870), Ashaghi Govhar Agha Mosque in Shusha (1874–75) and Govharaga Mosque (19th century), as well as the Tatar Mosque in Odessa (1870), and the Garghabazar Mosque (1880) in Ashgabat Safikhan.

Believers who died in other places but were buried in a cemetery around the Imamzadeh mosque in Barda, according to their testimony.

There are several other historic monuments nearby the Imamzadeh Mosque. Approximately 20 m (66 ft) to the north of the mosque, is Bahman Mirza Qajar Mausoleum and to the east, are the ruins of Akhsadan Baba Mausoleum, which was built in the 14th century.

== See also ==
- Islam in Azerbaijan
- List of mausoleums in Azerbaijan
- List of mosques in Azerbaijan
