= Iranian brickwork =

Iranian brickwork may refer to:

- Banna'i (or hazarbaf), a technique of architectural ornamentation, particularly in Iranian architecture
- the use of masonry in contemporary Iranian architecture, inspired by traditional brickwork techniques
