= Banna'i =

Use of glazed tiles alternating with plain brick for decorative purposes

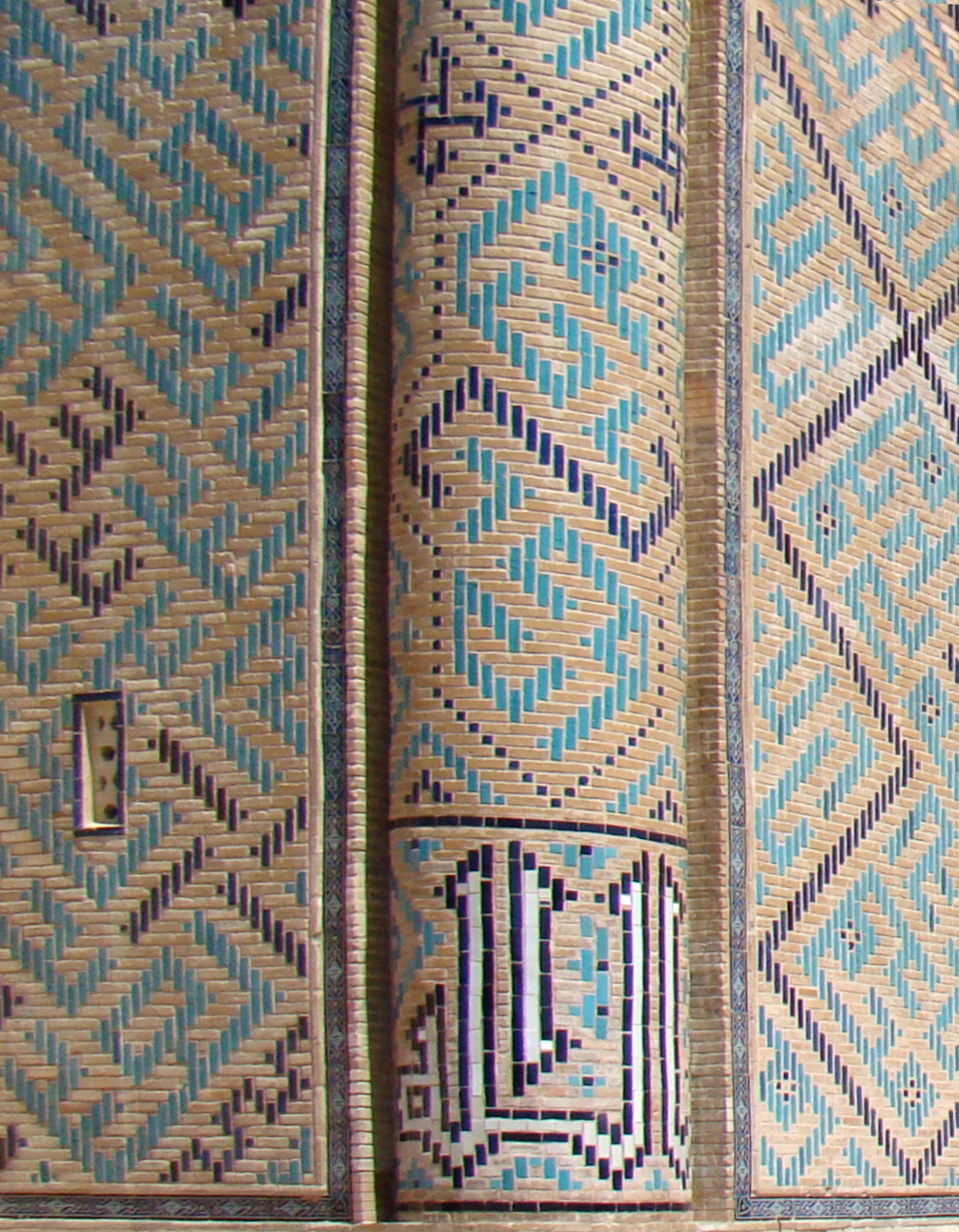
Banna'i brickwork in the Mausoleum of Khoja Ahmed Yasavi. The blue brickwork spells out the names of Allah, Muhammad and Ali in square Kufic calligraphy.

In Iranian architecture, banna'i (Persian: بنائی, "builder's technique" in Persian) is an architectural decorative art in which glazed tiles are alternated with plain bricks to create geometric patterns over the surface of a wall or to spell out sacred names or pious phrases. This technique originated in Syria and Iraq in the 8th century, and matured in the Seljuq and Timurid era, as it spread to Iran, Anatolia and Central Asia.

If the brickwork design is in relief then it is referred to as hazarbaf (Persian: هزارباف, compound of hazar "thousand" and baf "weavings", referring to the woven appearance of the bricks).

== History ==
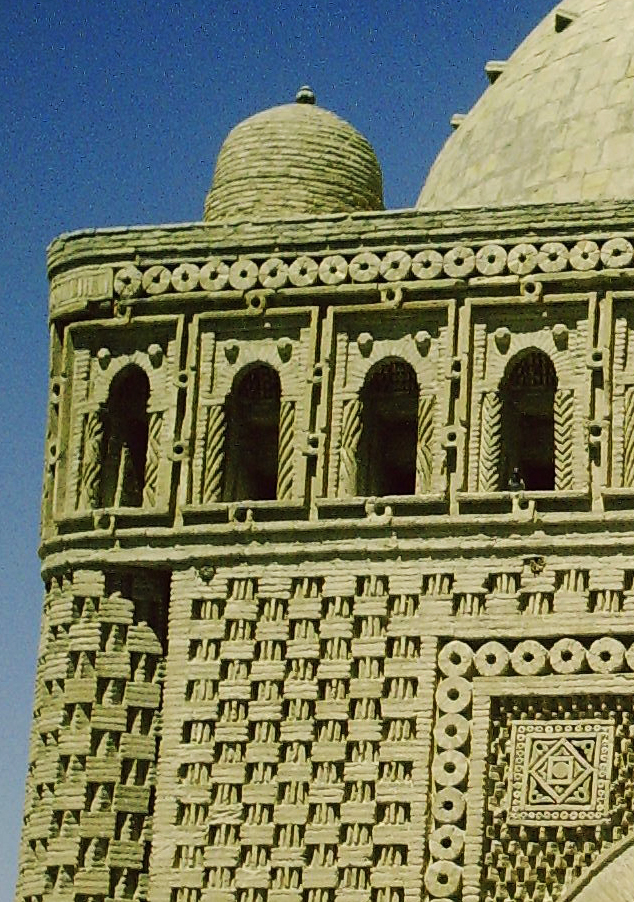
The walls of the Samanid Mausoleum (9th or 10th century) represent an early example of hazarbaf, a weaving-like pattern of brickwork.

The earliest surviving example of decorative brick work with colored bricks is found in the city gate of Raqqa (c. 772). The earliest known example of hazārbāf is found in the Ukhaidir Fortress near Baghdad, built around 762. The technique appeared in Iran and central Asia more than a century later but with more sophisticated designs. The tomb of the Samanid ruler Ismā'īl (in Bukhara, Uzbekistan), had walls with protruding and recessed bricks that created a weaving pattern.

Islamic brickwork grew in sophistication of its techniques over the centuries. In the 11th century, the use of multiple brick sizes, and variation in the depth of the joint between bricks formed shadow that contrasted strongly with the horizontal lines of the brick rows (for example the Arslan Jadhib Mausoleum in the Sang-Bast complex). Rows of brick were set deep inside the face of the building and raised above it, to create positive and negative spaces (for example in the Damghan minaret and Pir-e Alamdar tower). The Chehel Dokhtaran minaret in Isfahan (built 1107-1108) is one of the earliest example of brick work with triangles, squares, octagons, cruciform designs (another example, minaret of Saveh, has raised brickwork in Kufic and Nashki script). The Gunbad-i Sorkh monument in Azerbaijan (built in 1147) was made of ten different types of carved bricks in its corner columns.

In the 12th century in Azerbaijan, bricks were combined with glazed tiles, with examples such as the Barda Mausoleum and the Garabaghlar Mausoleum. Such bricks were typically cobalt blue and turquoise-colored.

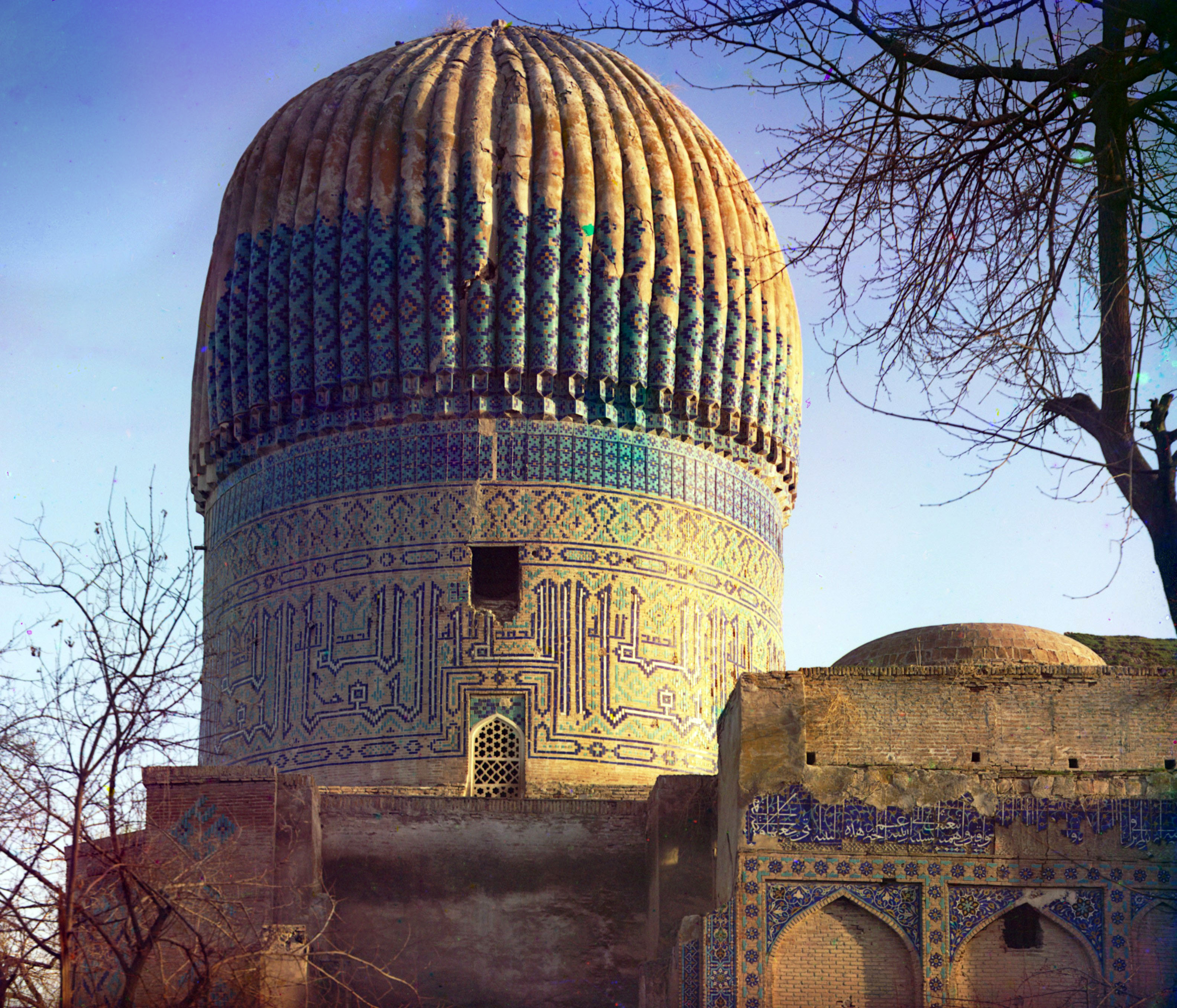
The tomb of Timur is covered with religious inscriptions made with colored bricks.

The earliest example of script set in brick work is seen on a minaret in Ghazni about 1100, spelling out the name of the ruler, the Ghaznavid ruler Massud III and his titles. Pieces of terracotta were inserted between the bricks to create the inscription. Later buildings used the shadows of raised bricks and others used different colored bricks to spell out words. This practice eventually led to the covering of whole brick buildings in sacred writing spelling out the names of Allah, Ali and Muhammad.

Square kufic, the version of the Arabic kufic calligraphy consisting of square angles only, is believed to have been an architectural adaptation of this script. Kufic writing was usually achieved using square bricks.

== See also ==
- Girih
- Barda Mausoleum
- Garabaghlar Mausoleum
- Zeynel Bey Mausoleum
- Mausoleum of Khoja Ahmed Yasawi
- Kalan Mosque
- Architecture of Uzbekistan
