= Bahman Mirza Qajar Mausoleum =

Burial place in Barda, Azerbaijan

- Bəhmən Mirzə Məqbərəsi
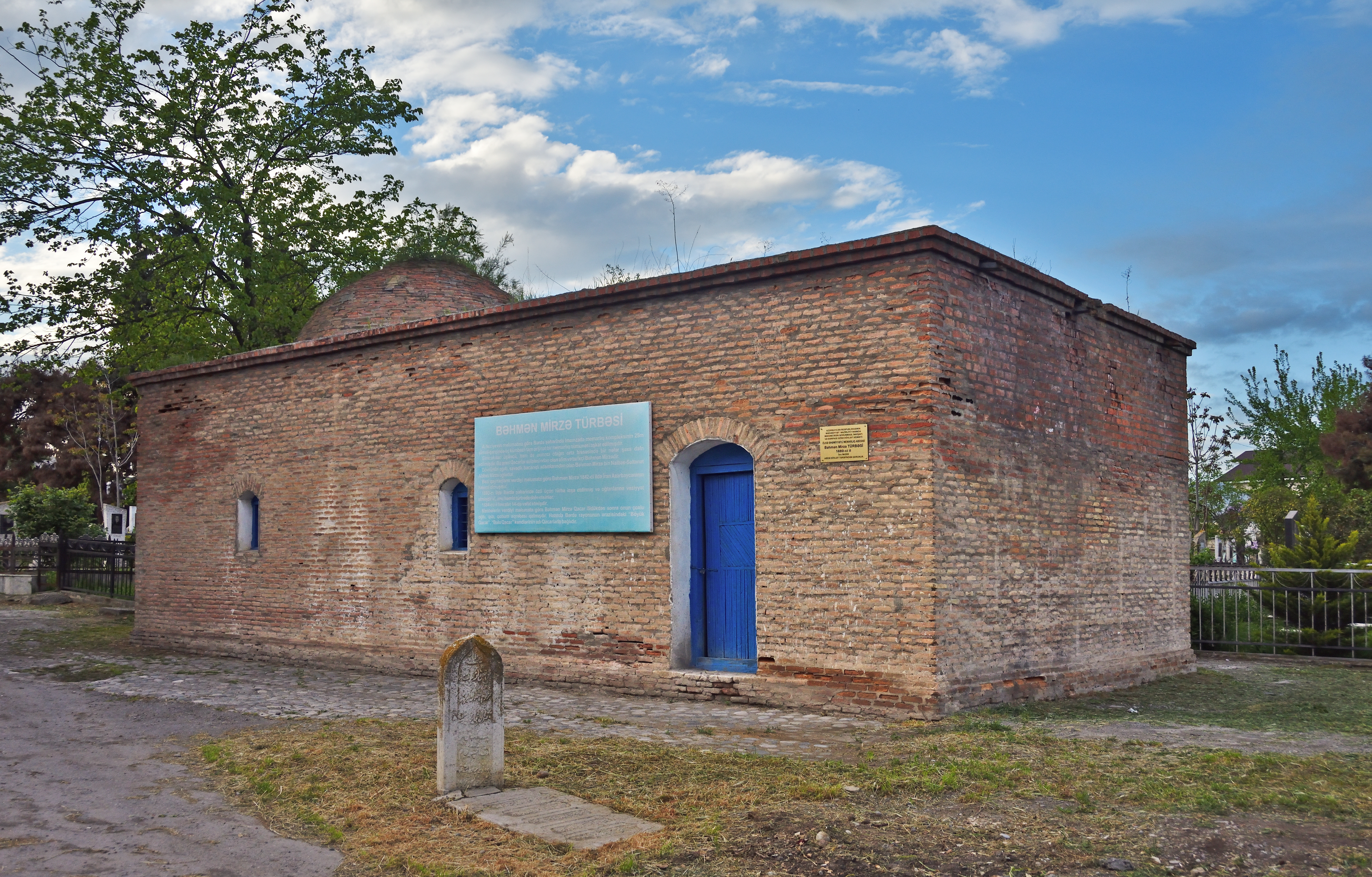
- Interactive map of Bahman Mirza Qajar Mausoleum
- Location: Barda, Azerbaijan
- Coordinates: 40°22′49″N 47°07′43″E
- Type: Mausoleum
- Completion date: 1880
- Dedicated to: Bahman Mirza Qajar

Bahman Mirza Qajar Mausoleum is a mausoleum with three domes located 25 meters north-east from Imamzadeh architectural complex in Barda in Azores.

== Design ==
Bahman Mirza built the mausoleum in 1880 and bequeathed it to his sons to bury him here. His tomb is located 25 meters east of the Imamzadeh tomb.

The monument is one of the rare types in Arran's architectural style to be built with baked bricks. Its domes are consolidated from both inside and outside. Bahman Mirza Qajar was buried in the third room from entrance, which is also middle of the last room. There are six inscriptions on the black marble on the inner walls of the dome. The texts written are related to the verses of the Koran: The life of the buried man is described as full of agony, frustration, longing, and shaking.

The height from the floor to the dome is 1 meter, and the walls of the tomb are 1 meter thick.

== Bahman Mirza ==
The person buried in the grave is Bahman Mirza Qajar, scientist and historian from the Qajar dynasty. Bahman Mirza bin Naib As-Sultan Abbas Mirza, was the son of a prince. According to Raudet Uc-Safayi Nasiri, he was fourth in the age group of 26 surviving sons of Abbas Mirza. He was born in 1810. In his work, Tazgireyi Mohammed-Shahi, it is noted that at the time of his youth, his father appointed him ruler of Ardabil. According to the author's own note, this book was written with the request of his brother, Mohammad Shah Qajar, in 1835–1836. There are also a few poems left in the Persian language. According to some sources, Bahman Mirza had been the ruler of Persian Azerbaijan since 1842. He didn't stay in this post for a long time. His nephew Naser al-Din Shah Qajar was appointed to this post. In the meantime, Nasiraddin, the new ruler of Azerbaijan ordered the removal of eyes of Bahman Mirza. Having seen the situation, Bahman Mirza rushed to the Russian navigator and wanted shelter from him. The ambassador received him very well and allowed Bahman to live in Russia. On May 12, 1848, he arrived in Baku with the Lankaran ship. On May 15, he went to Shamakhi from Baku. Bahman Mirza, who was looking for a permanent place of residence, didn't stay here, came to Tiflis on May 20 to live. At that time, his work ended in the Iranian era, the era of Azerbaijan began. On May 28, his 7 wives and 19 children from these wives were brought to Nakhchivan, after which they were sent to Tiflis, to heads of the family.

According to some reports, seeing him expatriate, his nephew, Naser al-Din Shah, understood his mistake, pardoned him, and asked him to return. But Bahman did not come back again. Bahman Mirza was unable to live in Tiflis for a long time and bought the property of Malikbekov, who moved from Shusha on October 4, 1851, and stayed there with his family and lived in this city. Though he lived in Shusha, he took an active part in the cultural events of Karabakh. He often came to Barda, one of the oldest cities in Azerbaijan. During his 24 years in Karabakh, he began to write his new novel "Shukurnamei Shahanshahi". In this work, he described the sequence of historical events of the period from Genghis Khan to the XIX century. The work was completed in 1871. Having seen the old age, the scientist built a mausoleum for himself in Barda, 1880, and ordered his sons to bury him in the mausoleum. He died on February 11, 1884. His sons buried him in the mausoleum that was 25 meters east from Imamzadeh.

Bahman Mirza's had library of about 38,000 books. Currently, some of these books are kept in Tbilisi, and the rest are kept in libraries in Moscow, Saint Petersburg and Yerevan. Several books from his library are in the Institute of Manuscripts of the Azerbaijani Academy of Sciences. Manuscripts of Bahman Mirza's "Tazgireyi Mohammed – Shahi" and "Shukurnamei – Shahshanshah" are preserved there. Those books and manuscripts have been confirmed by Bahman Mirza's own seal and signature.

At present, the villages of "Boyuk Qajar" and "Bala Qajar" in the Barda region are formed of his descendants. Later his sons served as high-ranking officers in the Russian army. His four generals and four colonel sons were in military service in Russia and Iran. His son, who died in the Russian-Japanese war in 1904, was buried next to his father, Bahman Mirza Qajar. In recent years, the mausoleum has been restored.

== See also ==
- Architecture of Azerbaijan
- Bahman Mirza Qajar
