= Ilyas bey Aghalarov =

Russian military officer

- Native name: İlyas bəy Allahyar bəy oğlu Ağalarov
- Born: Ilyas bey Allahyar bey oglu Aghalarov; June 7, 1860; Yelisavetpol (Ganja), Elizavetpol uezd, Elizavetpol Governorate, Caucasus Viceroyalty, Russian Empire
- Died: March 18, 1913 (aged 52) Yelisavetpol, Elizavetpol uezd, Elizavetpol Governorate, Caucasus Viceroyalty, Russian Empire
- Buried: Goy Imam Mosque
- Allegiance: Imperial Russian Army (1879–1913)
- Branch: Imperial Russian Army (1879–1913)
- Service years: 1879–1913
- Rank: Colonel
- Conflicts: Russo-Japanese War; Siege of Port Arthur
- Education: 2nd Moscow Military Gymnasium; Pavel Military School

Ilyas bey Allahyar bey oglu Aghalarov (Azerbaijani: İlyas bəy Allahyar bəy oğlu Ağalarov, Russian: Ильяс-бек Аллахьяр-бек оглы Агаларов; 1860 – 1913), was a Russian military officer, and a colonel serving in the Russian Imperial Army.

== Early life ==
Ilyas bey Aghalarov was born on 7 June 1860, in Yelisavetpol (modern-day Ganja), then part of the Russian Empire. Born into an influential bey family, he received his general education at the 2nd Moscow Military Gymnasium.

== Military service ==
Aghalarov began his military service in September 1879 as an ordinary cadet at the Pavel Military School. On 8 August 1881, he started serving in the Erivan 13th Grenadier Regiment as a second lieutenant. On 10 May 1883, Aghalarov was transferred to the 3rd Caucasian Sapper Battalion of the Caucasian Sapper Brigade. On 8 August 1885, he was promoted to a lieutenant. From October 1892 to November 1894, Aghalarov commanded a company. He served as a staff captain from 1 August 1894. Four years later, on 1 August 1898, he was promoted to captain.

Aghalarov took part in the Russo-Japanese War. On 26 June 1904, he was promoted to lieutenant colonel with the appointment to the 1st East Siberian Military Telegraph Company of the newly formed East Siberian Telegraph Battalion. Returning from Port Arthur, Aghalarov continued his service in the 2nd Caucasian Combat Engineer Battalion of the 2nd Caucasian Army Corps. He became a colonel in 1911 and received seniority on 6 December 1910.

On 18 March 1913, Ilyas bey Aghalarov died a result of a suddenly exploding shell. He was buried in Elisabethpol, in the courtyard of the Goy Imam Mosque.

== Awards ==
- Order of Saint Anna 3rd degree. (1893)
- Order of Saint Stanislaus, 2nd degree. (1901)
- Order of Saint Vladimir 4th class with swords and bow. (1906)
- Order of St. Anne 2nd class with swords.
