= Garabaghlar Mausoleum =

Muslim tomb in Azerbaidjan

Coordinates: 39°25′N 45°11′E

Karabakhlar Mausoleum
- Qarabağlar türbəsi آرامگاه قره‌باغلار
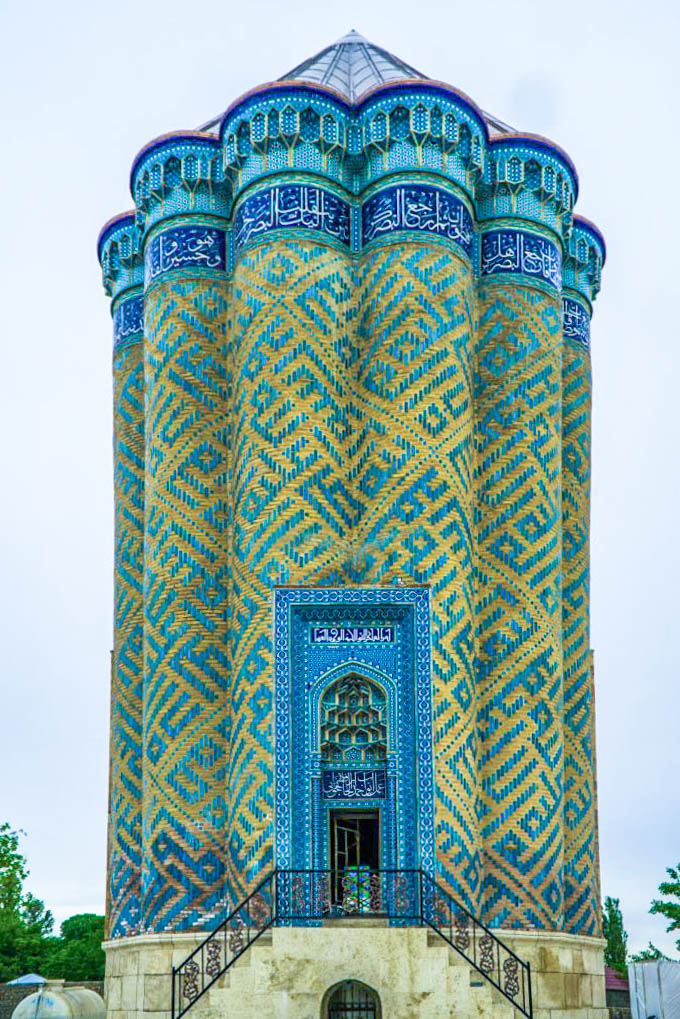
- Interactive map of Karabakhlar Mausoleum
- Location: Kangarli District, Nakhchivan Autonomous Republic
- Type: Mausoleum
- Beginning date: 12th–14th centuries

The Karabakhlar Mausoleum (Azerbaijani: Qarabağlar türbəsi, Persian: آرامگاه قره‌باغلار) is a mausoleum located in Garabaghlar village of Kangarli District of Azerbaijan, about 30 kilometers far from the north-western part of Nakhchivan.

== History ==
The mausoleum, built in the first half of the 14th century, is partially demolished and has a cylindrical form with twelve semicircular facets. The mausoleum, which has a circular form in the inner part, is 30 meters high. Two minarets having quadrangular foundation in the lower part are located about 30 meters from the mausoleum. The minarets of the ensemble belong to the 12th century.

The Qarabaghlar Mausoleum is part of a complex including a tomb and two minarets. The minarets are date approximately to the late 12th and early 13th centuries. The little portal carrying the name of Qutui Khatun that connects the two minarets is also datable to the 14th century. It is thought that Qutui Khatun was the wife of Abaqa Khan. It is possible that an architect, who set a goal of building in honor of Qutui Khatun within the new complexes built in the 12th–13th centuries, built this monument then.

The history of the monument and its minarets can also be dated to the 14th century – during the reign of Abu Sa'id Bahadur Khan (1319-1335) for their style and construction methods.

The complex was extensively restored in 2018.

== Architectural characteristics ==
The main characteristics of tomb towers can be seen in the Qarabaghlar mausoleum. The mausoleum is divided into two parts – a burial vault in the lower part and an upper overground part. The burial vault's plan is similar to the Barda Mausoleum. The overground part of the Qarabaghlar mausoleum is very interesting for its architectural structure. The body of the mausoleum which stands on a stone pedestal consists of 12 polylobes. The mausoleum is distinguished from other mausoleums located in Azerbaijan by this architectural form. There is an epigraphic frieze at the top of the cylinder, as at the Barda Mausoleum. This inscription on Garabaghlar Mausoleum was written with letters of white color and its background was made of blue frieze.

Four portals of the upper chamber are effectively allotted. Lancet arches with stalactitical infillings are centers of the southern, western and eastern portals. Slats with inscriptions written in neskh and stylized kufi are included into composition of portals. Stylized ornaments of plants dominate in the southern and western parts, but ornaments of the eastern part are geometric. Trunks of columns and their cubic capitals are also covered with composite mosaic.

A complicated system of stalactites underline a line of archivolt, infilling the space of an arched niche. Golden glaze is sparingly interspersed with ornamental patterns of the portal, which is not met in the area of the mausoleum anymore. Thanks to the deep niches in the sides of a central square, the burial vault of the mausoleum has taken the form of an equal-ended cross. It was covered with a groin vault. The Walls are encased with two rows of thoroughly drafted stone plates, over which oversails brick placement of cushions. The upper chamber is a straight 12 edged dimension of oversailed proportions. Rectangular niches on the walls are framed by more narrow equilateral niches. The top of the 12-side body is surrounded by a two-tier muqarnas corbel, used as a crossover to the inner cupola, which is folded by stone blocks.

The foundations of two minarets attached to the portal are prolonged rectangular prisms. The façades of the foundations are treated with patterned placing framed with trilobite equilateral arch. Not tall, octahedral bulk is used as a pedestrian to cylindrical trunks of the minarets built of circle brick. Narrow banna'i bricks with turquoise glaze were put to vertical junctures of placing. The image of the placing gets across an Arabic ligature, beginning in the trunk of one of the minarets and finishing in the other. The inscription is written in Kufic script, similar to that of the Mumine Khatun mausoleum. Terra-cotta colored letters were placed against a turquoise background – this method is relatively rare in architecture found in Azerbaijan dating to the Middle Ages.

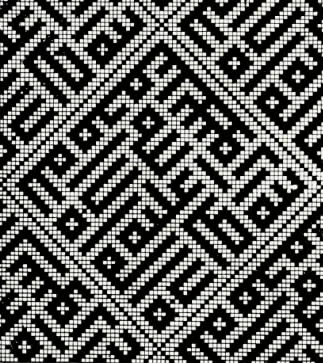
Banna'i façade ornament of Garabaghlar Mausoleum consists of repeating words - “There is no God but God, and Muhammad is His prophet. May God bless him”

The top of the minarets were badly damaged, until the 2018 restoration. Narrow spiral stairs built of simple tablet bricks (20x20x5) ascend within the minarets. There are saved remains of imposts of arches and found out multiple remains of walls in different levels of masonries of the mausoleum's minarets. There was a significantly bigger portal in the place of the existing one, about which evidence fragments of masonry, which oversails the bay between minarets. The glaze with mosaic patterns yields to the glaze of the minarets and mausoleum in quality and its background is black. The glaze is covered with a grid of capillary cracks and weakly connected to a crock. Motifs of ornaments of the mausoleum's decoration aren't met in the decors of the minarets’ portal. Remains of an inscription written in neskh indicates about an order of construction of the mausoleum and the name “…Jehan Qutui Khatun”. Perhaps, there is mentioned Qutui Khatun, one of the wives of Hulagu Khan, mother of Tekuder – Sultan Ahmad.

Excavations in 1940, found out walls of a building, a band of which's placing is dated back to the same time as the placing of the minarets. Configuration of a plan and dimensions of premises reminds of khanega. The walls of the building are detached far from the mausoleum.

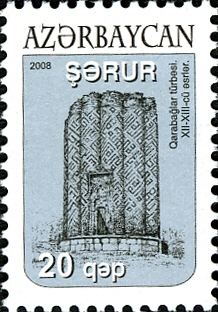
Post stamp (2008)

Peculiarities of the architectural structure of the mausoleum indicate that masters of various architectural professions were involved in its construction. Despite a generality of the composition and architectural appearance of the portals, the detailed representation of the arches’ archivolts is also original. There are patterns which aren't met in other portals. Ligatures common for style are differently interpreted and placed on planes; decorations included in images of the ligatures are diverse; butts of the ornament's band are authorized differently, which are common for some portals for their images. Characterizing architecture of the mausoleum, its corrugated surface, determining architectural expressiveness of its appearance in a significant level should be especially mentioned. This method acquired extremely wide propagation, both timely and territorially. This method was initially met and widely used mainly in pre-feudal defense constructions of Trans-Caspian. Distribution of this method to memorial (Mausoleums of Qarabaghlar, Radkan and Kishmar) and cultic (Jar-Kurgan) constructions dates back to the earlier times. Barda mausoleum is the most similar to Qarabaghlar mausoleum by analogy.

== See also ==
- Melik Ajdar Mausoleum
- Yusif ibn Kuseyir Mausoleum
- Mausoleum of Sheikh Juneyd
