= Imamzadeh Mausoleum (Shamakhi) =

14th century mosque in Azerbaijan

- Azerbaijani: İmamzadə türbəsi
- Location within Azerbaijan

General information
- Type: Mosque
- Architectural style: Architectural school of Shirvan-Absheron
- Location: Shamakhi, Azerbaijan
- Coordinates: 40.6285574°N 48.6362815°E
- Completed: 1370
- Renovated: 1910–1917, 1991

Technical details
- Material: Limestone

Renovating team
- Architect: Zivar bey Ahmadbeyov (1910–1917)

Imamzadeh Mausoleum (Azerbaijani: İmamzadə türbəsi) is a mosque on the Imamli street in the central part of the city of Shamakhi. The mosque was registered by Ministry of Culture and Tourism of Azerbaijan Republic as a historical and cultural monument of the country.

== History ==
Abbasgulu Bakikhanov mentioned in his famous Gulistani-Iram work in 1841: "In many ways, the ruins of the village and the high-ranking three imamzadehs in the cities of Shamakhi, Ganja and Barda, as well as Imamzadeh in the Bulbule village show that this country has always been the homeland of the religious elders"

The mausoleum was built on the tomb of one of the sons of the fourth imam, Zeynalabdin – Allama Seyyid Mohammed Saleh al-Madirris. Also, Seyid Mirmehdi Agha Seyidali oghlu, who had worked here as akhund for a long time, was buried here in 1911. The mosque was built in 1370 and was reconstructed because of the project of Zivar bey Ahmadbayov in 1910–1917. Generally, the mosque is supposed to be built five times. In 1991, it was restored under the leadership of akhund, Haji Elshan Rustamov. It is possible that 400 people can worship here at the same time.

The mosque complex consists of three parts – pilgrimage (Allama Seyyid Mohammed Saleh al-Madirris was buried there), place of worship and hoseyniyeh.
