= Imamzadeh Complex (Ganja) =

Islamic complex in Ganja, Azerbaijan

Imamzadeh Mausoleum
- Azerbaijani: İmamzadə türbəsi
- The mausoleum, inside the mosque
- Interactive map of Imamzadeh Mausoleum
- Location: Ganja, Azerbaijan
- Coordinates: 40°42′54″N 46°25′29″E
- Type: Mausoleum
- Material: Red brick; marble
- Height: 2.7 m (8 ft 10 in)
- Completion date: 8th century CE
- Dedicated date: Imamzadeh Ibrahim, son of Imam Muhammad al-Baqir
- Restored date: 18th century; 1879; and 2016
- Status: Damaged; partially restored

The Imamzadeh Complex is an important Islamic site, located near Ganja, in Azerbaijan. The complex comprises a mausoleum that houses the grave of a prominent figure in Shia Islam, several mosques including the Goy Imam Mosque, a garden, gated walls, and various funerary monuments. Located 7 km (4.3 mi) north of Ganja, the complex is a shining example of Islamic architecture. The complex is located within the Ganja State Historical and Cultural Reserve. It is a holy site in Shia Islam.

== Background ==
The main parts of the complex are the tomb building and cemetery. Besides, seven domes, mosque, caravanserai houses, the dome on the entrance gate to the monument (ninth dome), ornaments and inscriptions on the gravestones, pool and other auxiliary buildings along with the main tomb dome, shapes the architectural structure of Imamzadeh Mausoleum.

== History ==
In the Middle Ages, restoration and reconstruction work was carried out in the territory of the Imamzadeh Mausoleum. In the 15th and 16th centuries, as a result of the strengthening of the Shiite, special attention was paid to the construction of large structures, the use of religious attributes, as well as new craftsmanship in the repair and restoration of the mausoleum.

Basic information on the restoration of Ganja's ancient monuments, historical buildings, and religious sites dates from the 18th or 19th centuries as the restoration work was carried out by official people. During the reign of Javad Khan (1786–1804), major renovations were led by Karbalai Sadiq, palace architects. Between 1878 and 1879, Nizami Ganjavi mausoleum and the Imamzadeh complex were again reconstructed by the chief of the Second Muslim Riders Regiment of the Tsar Russian Army, Major-General Israfil bey Yadigarzadeh.

In 2010–2016, major reconstruction and restoration works were carried out in the Imamzadeh complex, as well as on the Ganja-Zazali road laying to the complex. Totally 31 million manats for restoration of Imamzadeh Mausoleum and 17 million manats for road reconstruction have been sent. 10,000 m^{2} (110,000 sq ft) of asphalt cover was laid on the territory of the complex, decorated with ornamental stones, lighting system was installed, infrastructure was created. There are two minarets, namazgah (place for prayer) and visitor hall with a height of 42 m (138 ft), as well as parking for 500 cars in the area. The first floor of the three-storey main building of the mausoleum is used as a wardrobe. The second floor consists of administrative rooms and the third floor is used as a hotel.

== Imamzadeh Mausoleum ==
The Imamzadeh Mausoleum (Azerbaijani: İmamzadə türbəsi), located inside the Goy Imam Mosque, bears the grave of Imamzadeh Ibrahim, son of Imam Muhammad al-Baqir, the fifth Imam of Shi'a Muslims.

The Imamzadeh Mausoleum was constructed in the 8th century. According to the inscription found inside the mausoleum, the sons of Mohammad al-Baqir, who is considered one of the most sacred personalities of Shia Islam, left their motherland and moved to Azerbaijan and Iran to escape from the ruling circles of the Umayyad Caliphate (661-750), who carried out persecution against the family of the Prophet of Islam. Imamzadehs Ibrahim and Ismail came to the cities of Azerbaijan – Barda and Ganja, but they were killed by their enemies. Mausoleums were erected on the graves of Imamzadeh Ismail in Barda, and Imamzadeh Ibrahim in Ganja. The inscription is composed of a small marble plaque on the first floor of the Imamzadeh Tomb.

=== Architecture ===
Imamzadeh was originally a grave in the early Middle Ages. The complex evolved as a mausoleum was constructed above the grave, and then, with the increased importance of the mausoleum as a sanctuary, new craftsmanship and architectural elements were added. The mausoleum is the major monument of the complex. This mausoleum shows how many mausoleums acquired cultic architectural features, losing their features of memorial monuments in the 16th-19th centuries. The mausoleum belongs to tower-cupola types of buildings.

A two-storeyed arch shaped the extension of the mausoleum, surrounding the central kernel from three sides, with a portal from the eastern part. This arch dates from the 17th century. A margin of lancet arches with rectangular frames is a peculiar feature of the extension. The mausoleum is built of square bricks. Inside the mausoleum there is a zarih.

The 2.7 m-high (8.9 ft) mausoleum was constructed using red bricks and features specific to the Arran Architectural School were used. Small dome cells on the right and left sides of the central dome are later added to the monument in the 13th-16th centuries.

== Goy Imam Mosque ==
Goy Imam Mosque
- The Goy Imam Mosque in 2026

- Location of the mosque in Azerbaijan

Religion
- Affiliation: Shia Islam
- Ecclesiastical or organisational status: Mosque
- Status: Active

Location
- Location: Ganja
- Country: Azerbaijan
- Coordinates: 40°42′54″N 46°25′29″E

Architecture
- Type: Mosque architecture
- Style: Islamic

Specifications
- Dome: Many
- Dome height (outer): 14.7 m (48 ft) (main)
- Dome height (inner): 12 m (39 ft) (main)
- Dome dia. (inner): 4.4 m (14 ft) (main)
- Minaret: Two
- Minaret height: 42 m (138 ft)

The Goy Imam Mosque is a large and tall Shia Islam mosque with three minarets, that was built over the Imamzadeh Mausoleum. The central dome of the mosque is decorated with floral elements and symbolic characteristic peacock drawings. The central dome differs significantly from others in terms of its structure and dimensions, and is distinguished by its elegant design features. This central dome is called the “Imam Ibrahim dome” and it is 14.7 m (48 ft) high, is in the shape of an ancient helmet (təskulə), with a diameter of 4.4 m (14 ft).

The most prominent part of the Goy Imam Mosque in terms of appearance is the dome and its cylindrical body, decorated with colorful blue and green tiles. The baklava-shaped and other figure ornaments are dark purple. At the same time, it is also possible to find individual greenish tiles. These decorative elements have been added to the monuments in the 14th to 17th centuries. The first floor of the southeastern façade consists of three arches.

== Gallery ==
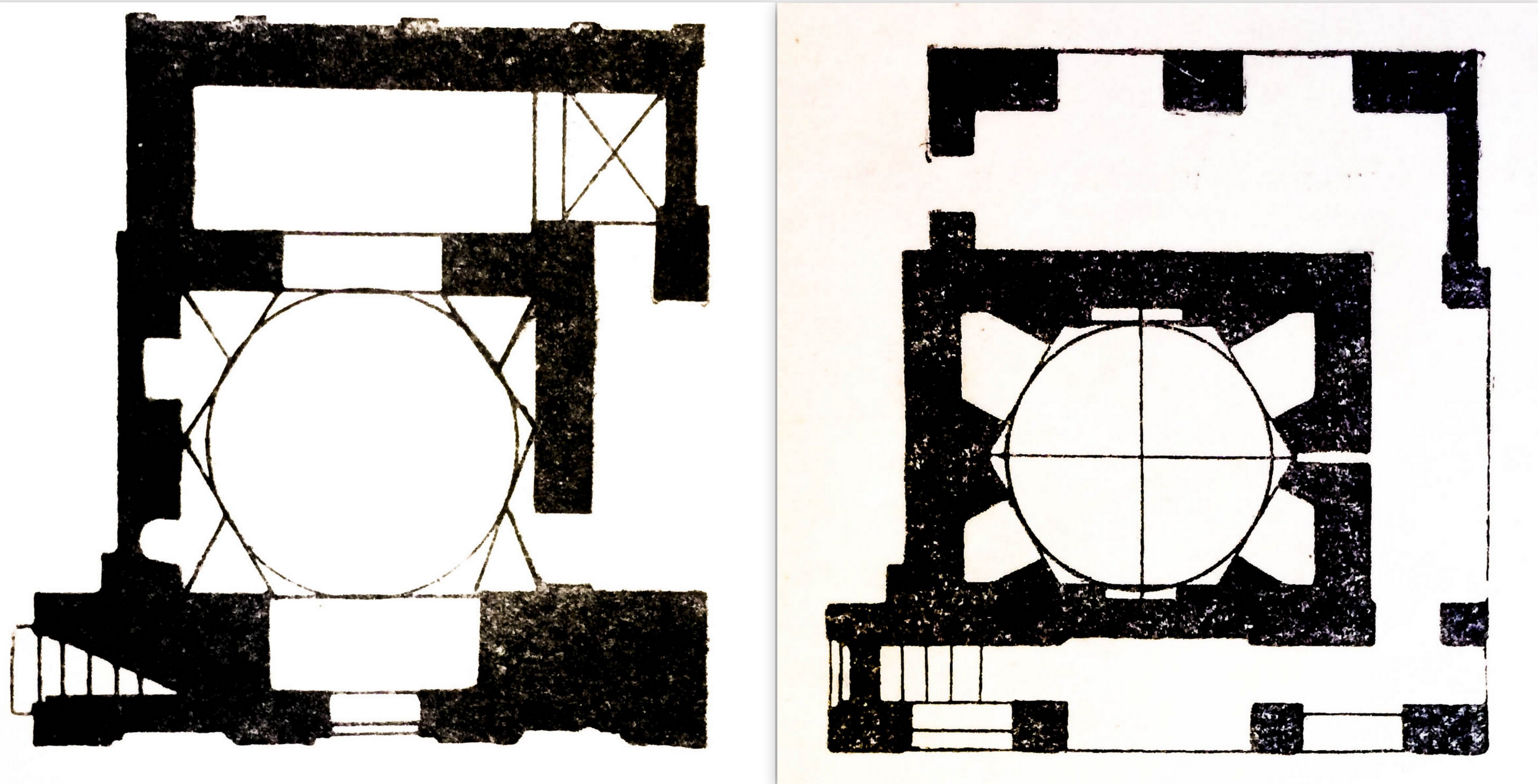
Mausoleum floor plan

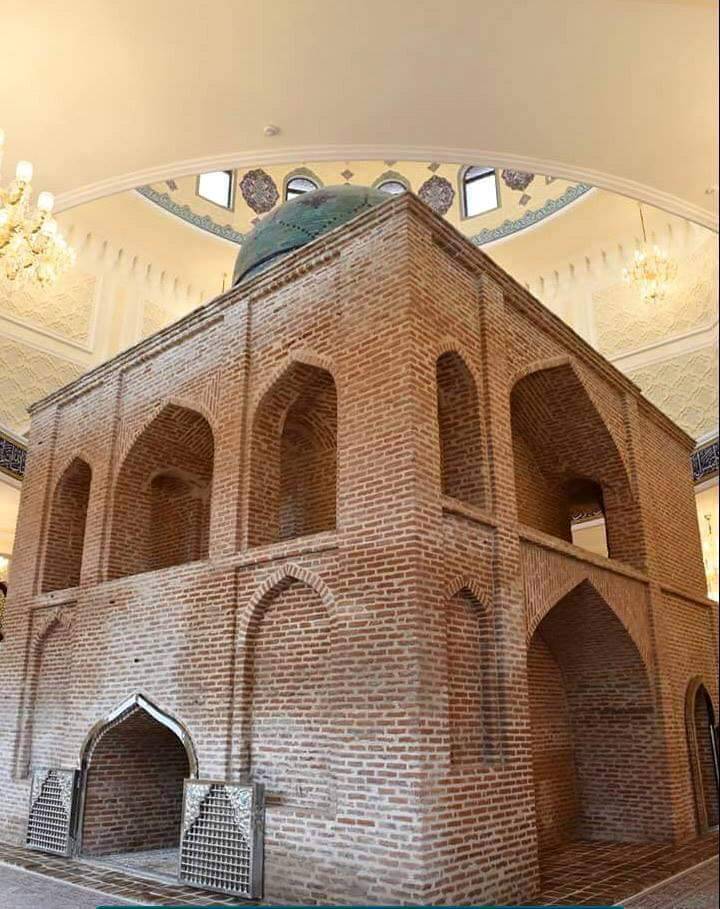
Restored red brick mausoleum, in 2016

The tomb inside the Mausoleum (2026)

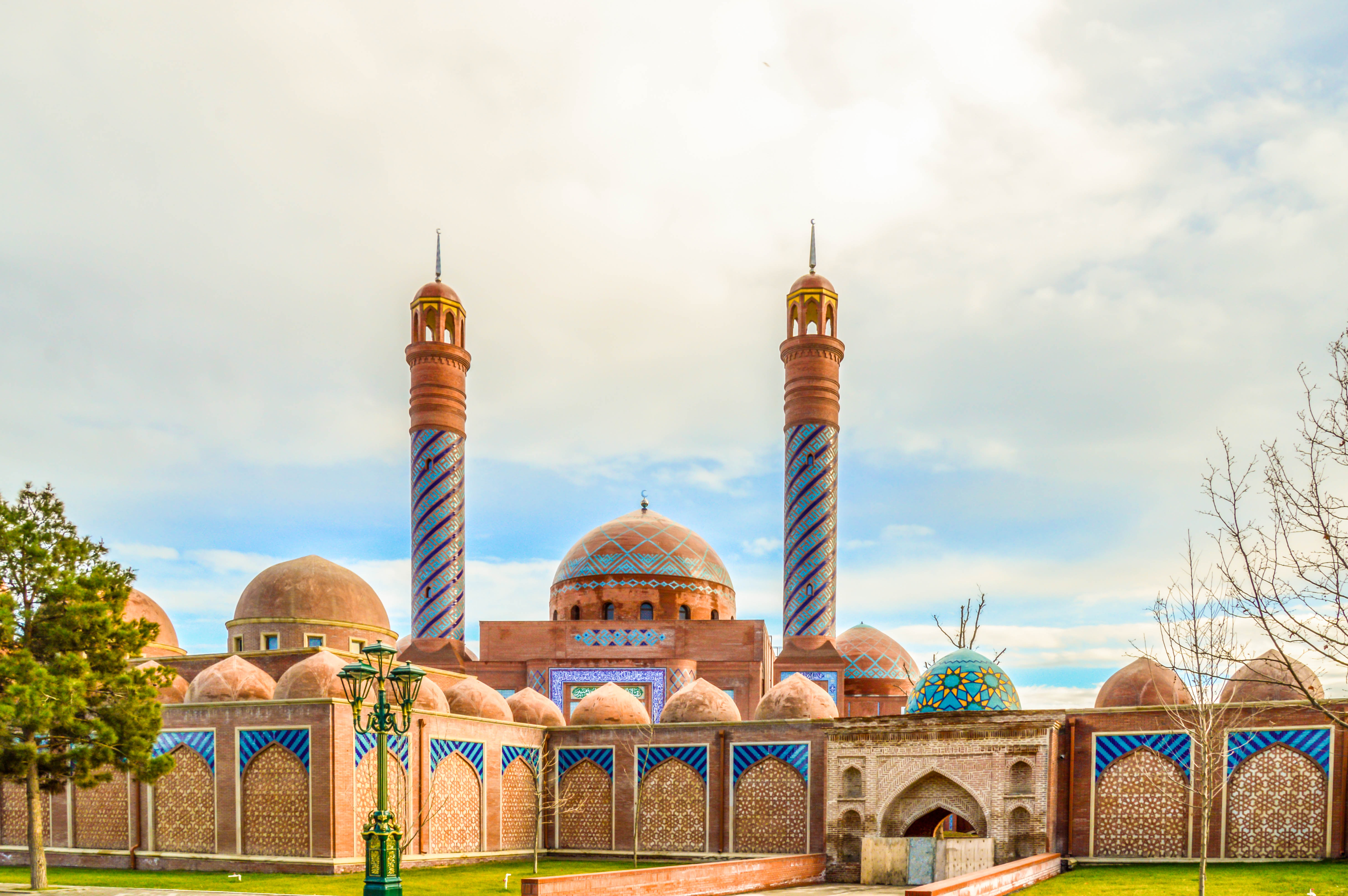
The complex in 2016, with the exterior of the Imam Ibrahim dome and many other domes

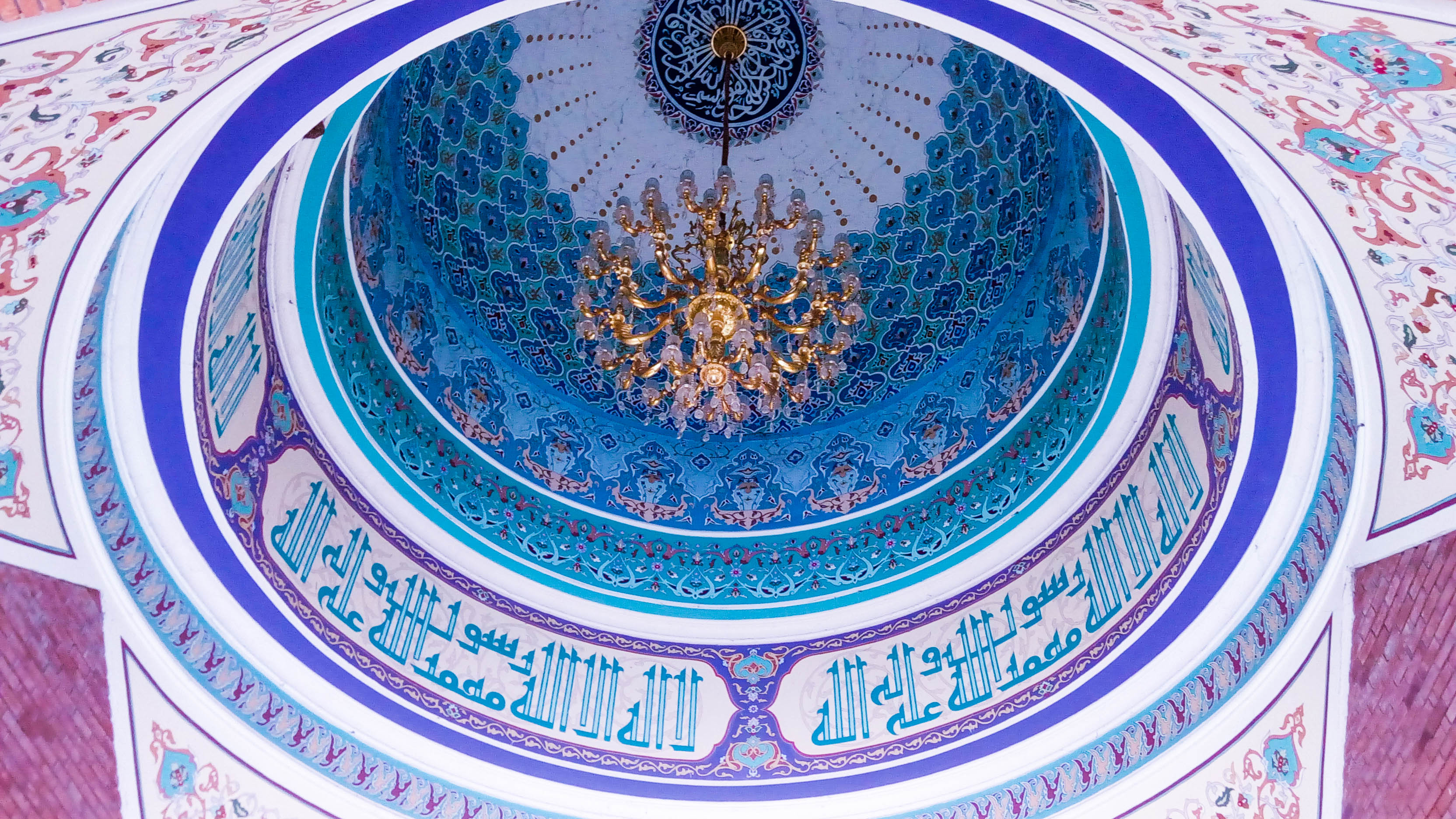
Imam Ibrahim dome interior

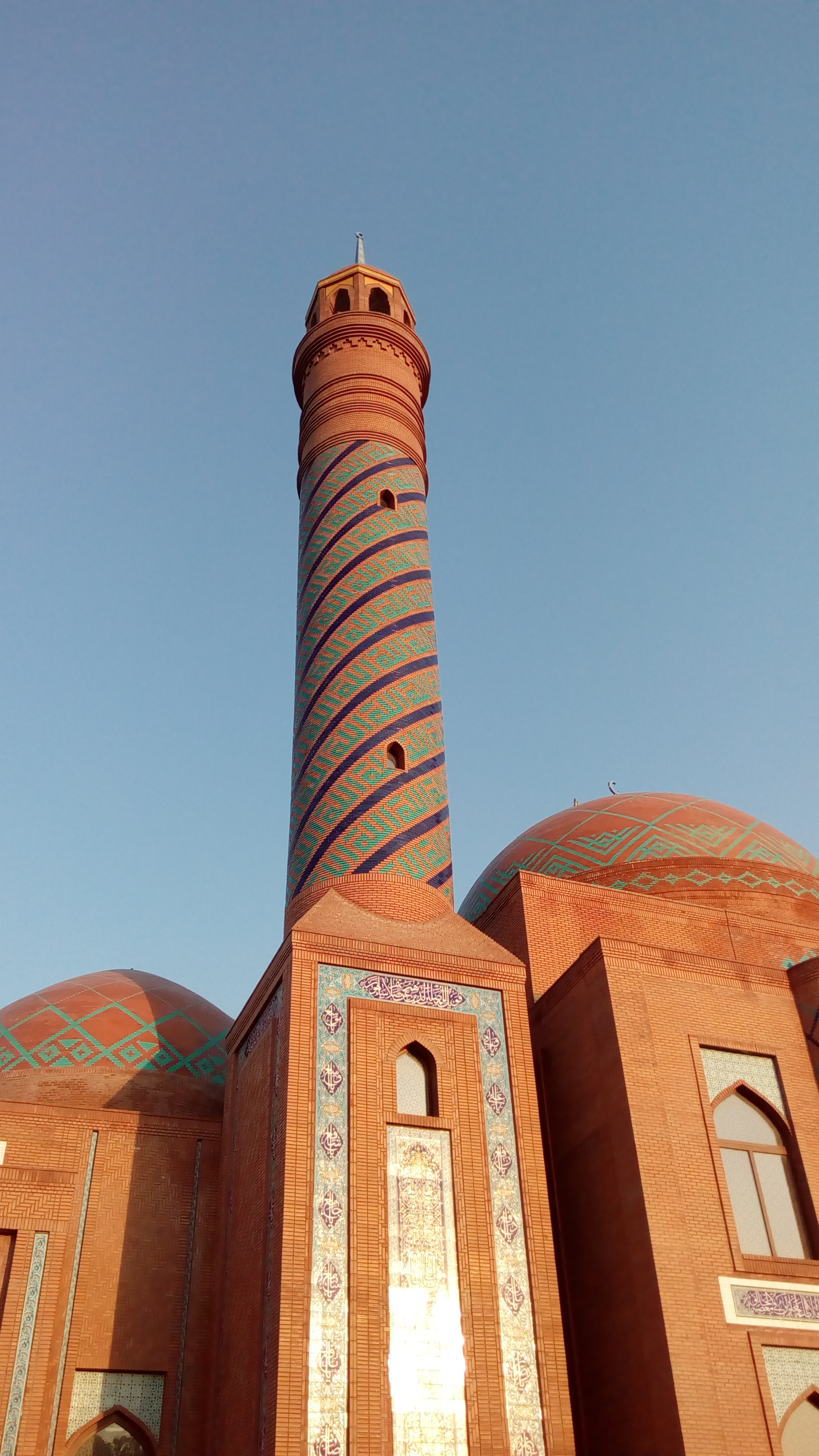
Detail of the mosque exterior, in 2018

== See also ==
- Shia Islam in Azerbaijan
- List of mausoleums in Azerbaijan
- List of mosques in Azerbaijan
- Ilyas bey Aghalarov, interned in the complex's courtyard
