= Akhsadan Baba Mausoleum =

14th century building in Azerbaijan

Coordinates: 40.3806°N 47.1229°E

- Axsadan baba türbəsi
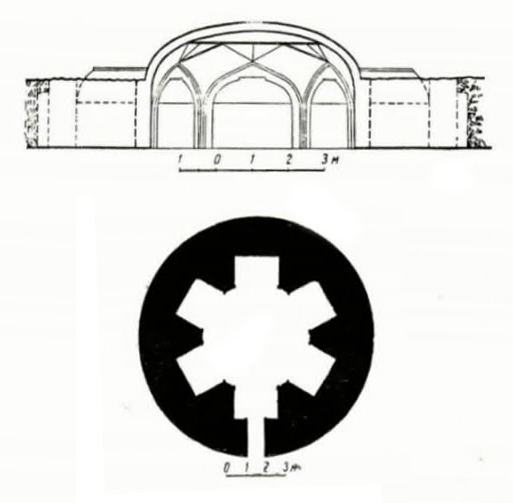
- Interactive map of Akhsadan Baba Mausoleum
- Location: Barda, Azerbaijan
- Designer: Ahmad ibn Eyyub
- Type: Mausoleum
- Beginning date: 14th century

Akhsadan Baba Mausoleum (Azerbaijani: Axsadan baba türbəsi) – is a mausoleum of the 14th century, located in Barda, Azerbaijan.

It is considered that the mausoleum was constructed by Ahmad ibn Eyyub. Earlier, the mausoleum belonged to a group of cylindrical “tower” mausoleums. At present, only the underground burial vault is saved from the building. It is also noted that the mausoleum attracts attention with features by which it is distinguished among other monuments of the architectural school of Nakhchivan. Organization of the inner space in form of six-ended cross is not met anywhere. Ascetic strictness of interiors contrasting with a mosaic space of domes and strippings of the overhead cover is also mentioned.
