= Barda Mausoleum =

Historical monument of the XIV century in Azerbaijan

- Bərdə türbəsi آرامگاه باردا
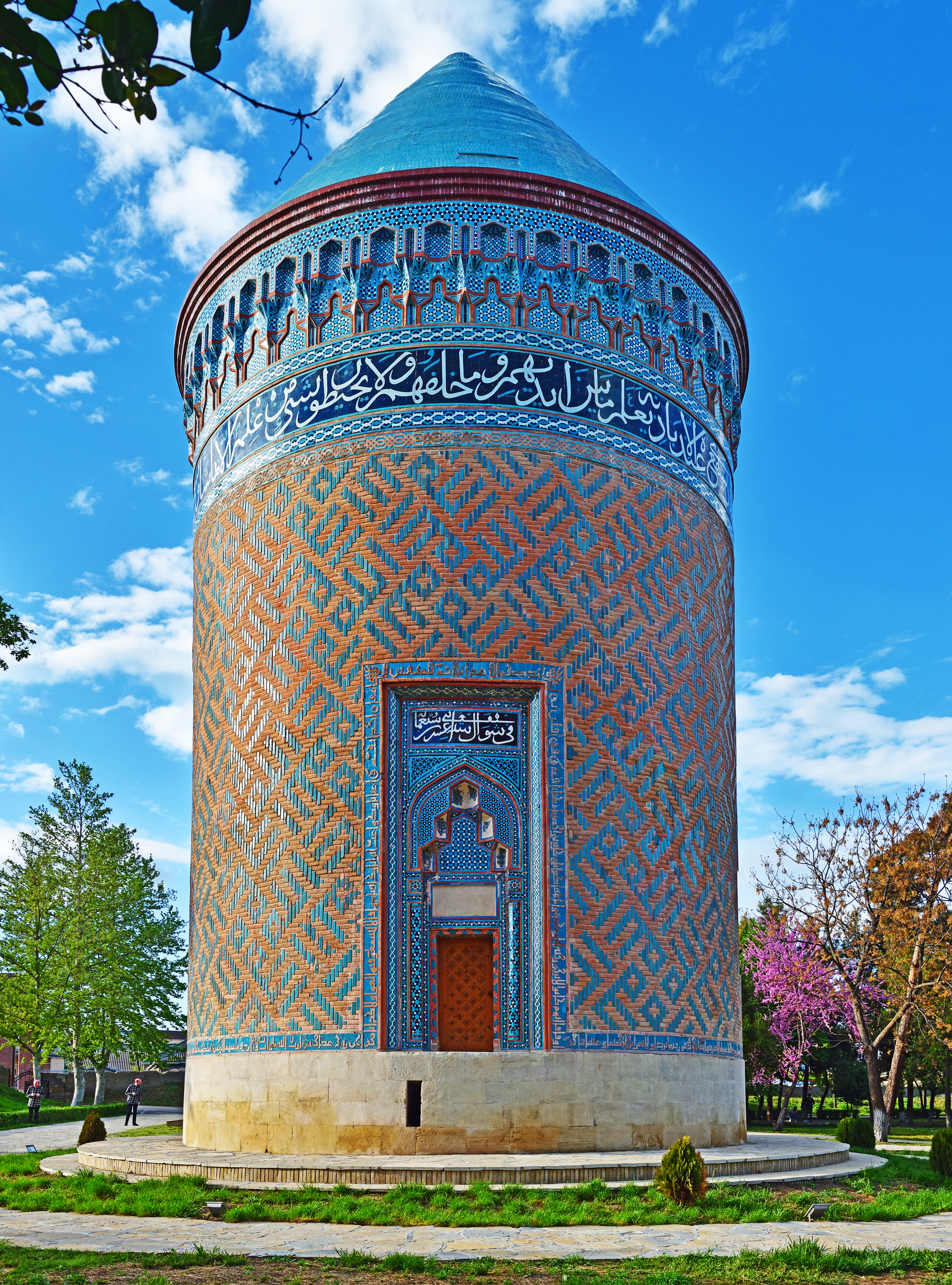
- Interactive map of Barda Mausoleum
- Location: Barda, Azerbaijan
- Designer: Ahmad Nakhchivani
- Type: Mausoleum
- Completion date: 1322

Barda Mausoleum (Azerbaijani: Bərdə türbəsi, Persian: آرامگاه باردا) – is located in Barda, Azerbaijan. It is one of the rare monuments which reached us safely. It is located in a small square-shaped territory surrounded by a cob wall.

== Architecture ==
The mausoleum consists of a 10 m diameter cylinder, with a 14 m of height (till the upper layer of a cupola). It also consists of an underground sepulcher and inner decahedron cell with exits. The structure of the inner space of its aerial part is very interesting. Its lower part is a cylinder that becomes a decahedron with 8.7 meters high niches at a height of 2 meters. At the upper part, the decahedron becomes a circle.

The mausoleum was built of burnt and green-blue colored glazed bricks, which makes the word “Allah” for more than 200 times.

Like in Garabaghlar Mausoleum, unglazed red facing bricks of this mausoleum are laid horizontally, but green-blue glazed bricks – vertically.

Affluently decorated portals and the main architectural and compositional accents of the mausoleum should also be noted. The mausoleum is a cylindrical tower with a height of 14 m. It consists of two parts, over ground and underground (or basement). The underground part of the tomb has a cross-shaped view and the grave located in this part. This part of the tomb was once covered with a dome, and the interior was decorated with ornaments. The over ground part of the tomb is made up of three main architectural structures: keystone, circular ground form and tent-shaped dome. The diameter of the tower is 10 m. In the southern portal of the mausoleum the inscriptions indicate the date of construction: “Shawwāl (is the tenth month of the lunar based Islamic calendar) second and twentieth and seven hundred years” (that is, 722 AH or 1322). The inscription on the northern portal shows the name of the architect: “Ahmad ibn Ayuub al-Hafiz Nakhchivani”.

There are two entrances lead to the mausoleum (from north and south). The exterior of the tomb was made of glazed bricks which included greenish-blue color and usual good quality red bricks. Glazed bricks were set vertically and horizontally. The entire surface of the tower is covered with the repeating word “Allah”, rotated at an angle of 45 degrees. The word "Allah" is repeated over 200 times.

The upper frieze of the mausoleum is composed of four belts. Two lower belts and one upper are covered with ornaments, and the fourth wide belt located between them bears inscriptions. The entrances to the mausoleum from the north and the south are underlined by portals that stand out clearly against the general smooth background of the tower. The northern entrance to the mausoleum is accentuated by a richer finish and protrudes 30 cm from the body of the tower. Portal profiles, stalactites, archivolts and tympanums were decorated with geometric and vegetative ornaments in accordance with the patterns.

== Reconstruction ==
The restoration process of the tomb stated in the 1960s. However, due to negligence during restoration, the original appearance of the tomb changed (the inscriptions were erased, and the heavy concrete slab that placed on the roof caused cracks). In 2012, the restoration of the tomb started again in 2012 and continued until 2018. The roof tomb (which was initially made of concrete during the first reconstruction period) was completely dismantled and reconstructed by tiling over bricks. In approximately 427 m² area, simple and sophisticated tile elements were designed and applied. Ayatul-Kursi Surah and inscriptions with the Kufi alphabet that placed on the walls of the tomb while construction (in 14th century) were restored. In addition, the mortar joints between tiles were cleaned and refilled with a special mix of mud. Cracks on the wall have been completely regenerated. The stairs have been covered with a glass cover, and there is a marble coffin inside the tomb. The restoration works were carried out by the order of the State Service for Cultural Heritage Protection, Development and Rehabilitation under the Ministry of Culture and Tourism of the Republic of Azerbaijan by "Azerbarpa" Scientific-Research Project Institute. The reopening took place on March 25, 2018.

== History ==
Historically, two tower-shaped tombs were built in Barda city in the 14th century, and only one of them remained until the modern era. As its name in scientific literature, Barda tomb was erected in 1322 according to the inscriptions which illustrate when and by whom the monument was built. Due to its architecture, the tomb has attracted the attention of researchers since the 19th century after the invasion of the South Caucasus by the Russian Empire. The famous orientalist Khanikov, who visited Barda in 1848, read the inscriptions on the monument and these inscriptions were later published by academician Dorn in Barda in 1861. Academician Dorn also published the appearance of the Barda tomb.

This inscription in the Barda tomb is an extremely valuable example of the Nakhchivan architectural school, which confirms that the architects of Nakhchivan were invited to other cities to build important buildings in the XIV century.
