= Baku Oxford School =

Baku-Oxford School
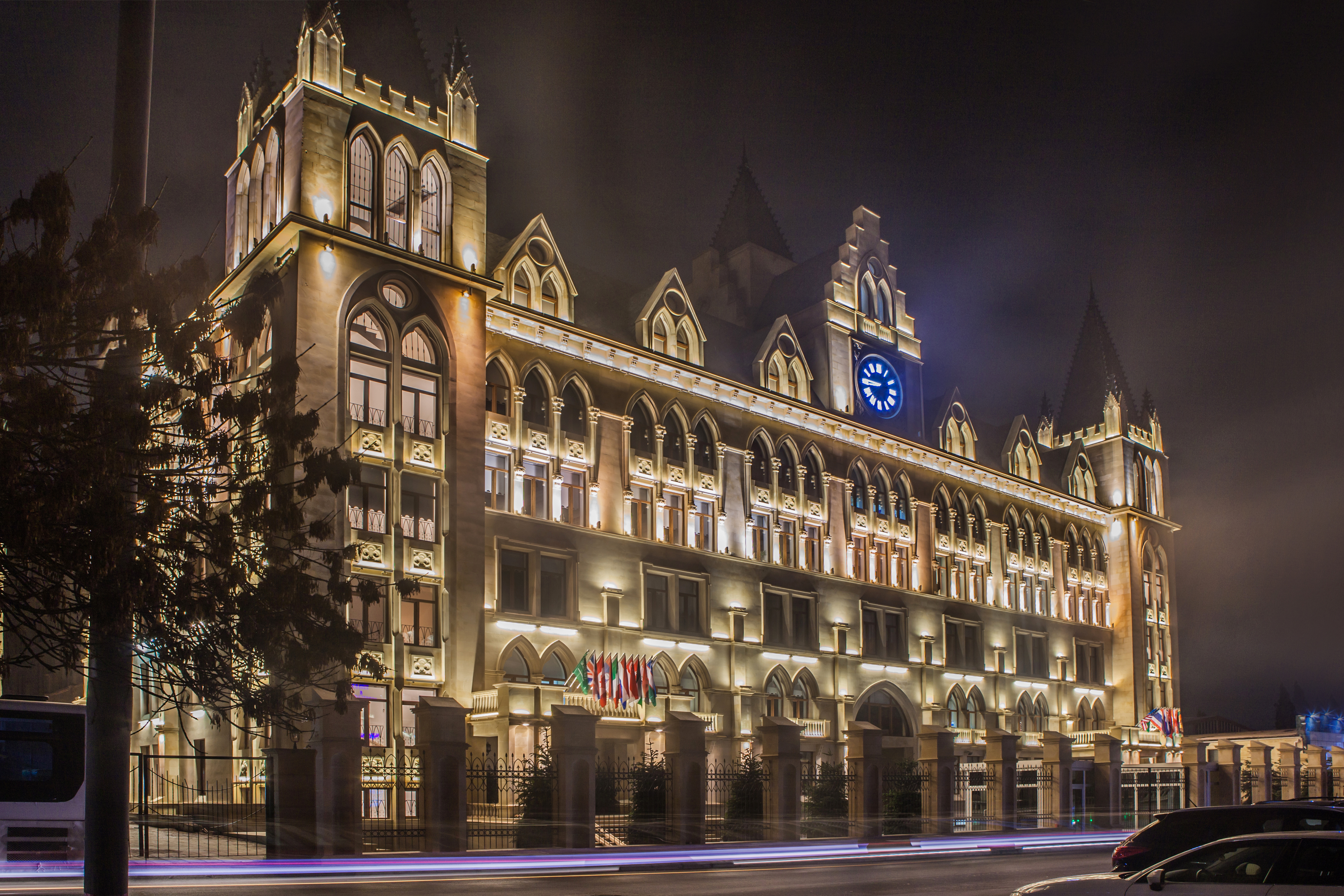

Location
- Baku; Azerbaijan

Information
- Established: 1998
- Superintendent: Mehriban Mammadova
- Principal: Reshat Ariel
- Enrollment: 600

Baku-Oxford School is an international school based in Baku, Azerbaijan. It was founded in 1998. The school offers education to children aged 4–18 years old. The six-story building includes a museum dedicated to the current president of Azerbaijan Ilham Aliyev on the ground floor.
