= Paster =

Paster may refer to:

- Paster (surname), a surname
- Paster (rapper) (born 1991), a rapper from Azerbaijan
- Flying Paster (1976–1992), an American Thoroughbred racehorse
- Pastil, a Filipino packed rice dish

== See also ==
- Pastor
- Paste (disambiguation)
