= Baku Boulevard =

Promenade in Baku, Azerbaijan

Coordinates: 40.3600°N 49.8371°E

- National Park
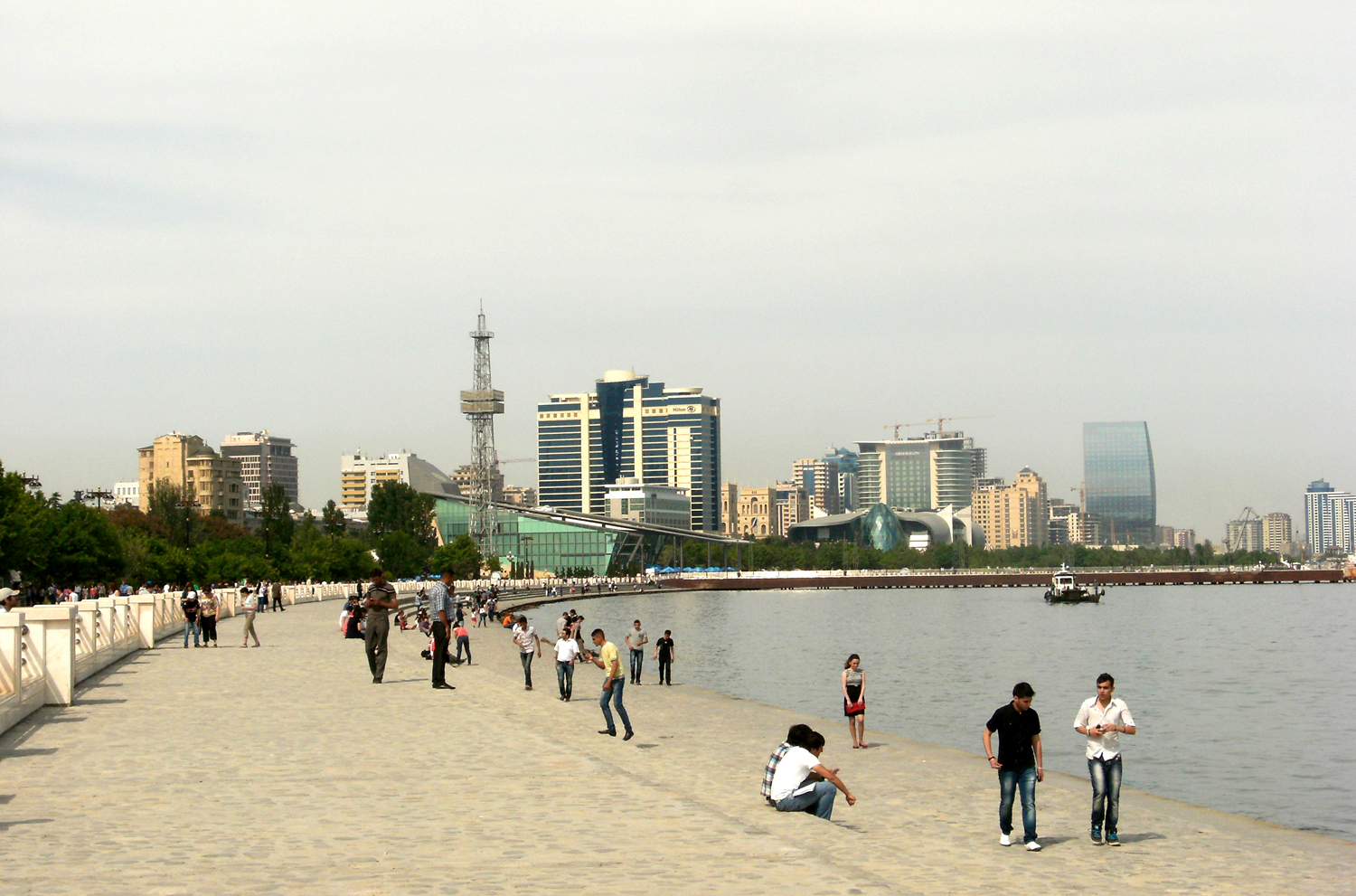
- Interactive map of Baku Boulevard
- Native name: Dənizkənarı Milli Park (Azerbaijani) or as known by locals, "Bulvar"
- Type: Boulevard
- Maintained by: Seaside Boulevard Office
- Location: Baku, Azerbaijan

Construction
- Completed: 1909
- Inauguration: March 26, 1909

Baku Boulevard (Azerbaijani: Dənizkənarı Milli Park, also known as National Park) is a promenade established in 1909 which runs parallel to Baku's seafront. Its history goes back more than 100 years, to a time when Baku oil barons built their mansions along the Caspian shore and when the seafront was artificially built up inch by inch.

== Location ==
The park stretches along a south-facing bay on the Caspian Sea. It traditionally starts at Freedom Square continuing west to the Old City and beyond. Since 2012, the Yeni Bulvar (new boulevard) has virtually doubled the length to 3.75 km, extending the promenades to National Flag Square. In 2015 White City Boulevard added a further 2 km to the east of Freedom Square and reports have suggested that eventually the boulevard might be as long as 26 km, including Bibiheybət.

== History ==
=== Imperial Russian and Azerbaijan Democratic Republic Eras ===
Baku boulevard

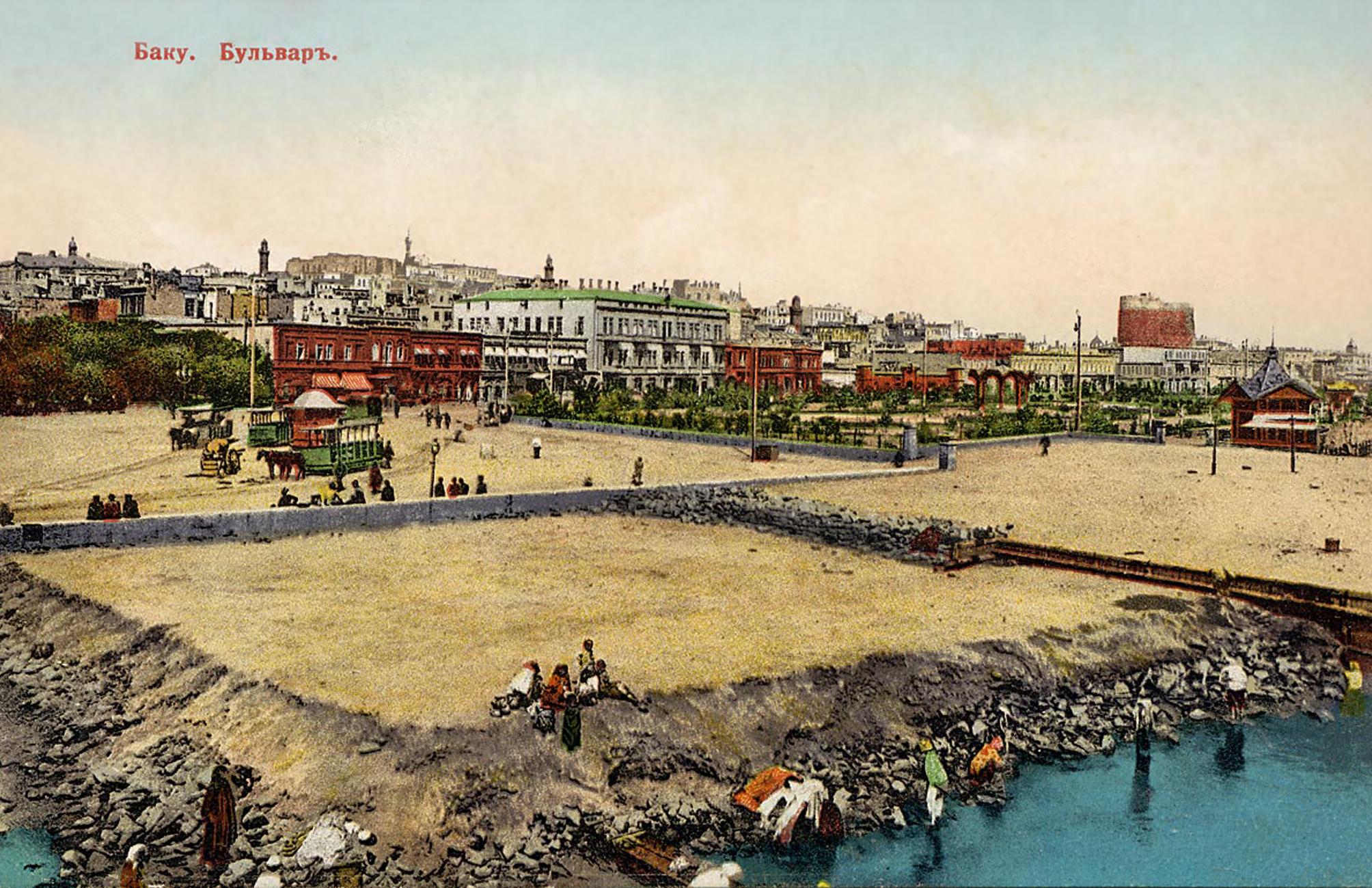
The Baku boulevard in the early 20th century

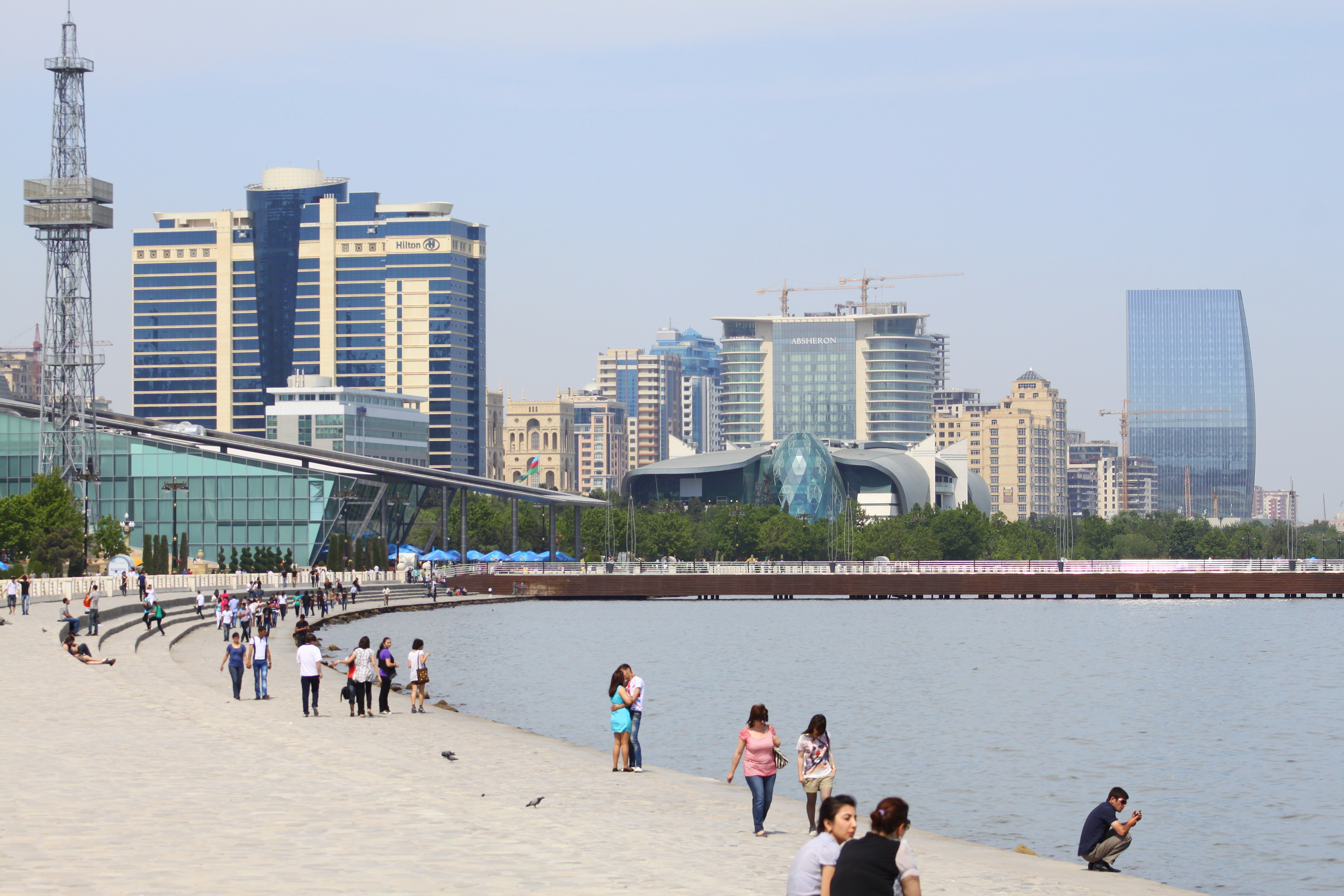
Baku boulevard today

The boulevard was established to connect the oilfields in Bibi Heybet as part of the urban development projects by Municipal Horticultural Commission.

In 1900, the Municipal Horticultural Commission decided to plant trees and shrubs along the seafront. Kazimierz Skurewicz, a Polish engineer, designed a 20-meter-wide embankment, using vegetation that would survive Baku's extremely hot, dry and gusty climate.

In 1909, Mammad Hassan Hajinski, Head of Baku's Municipal Construction Department improved the park by spending 60,000 rubles after Duma passed his resolution. The park was intended to provide for the continued expansion of the city to the north, providing relaxation and recreation opportunities for the new middle class to the west, and an escape from the rapid slumming of the city centre for those left behind. To select the best design for the Boulevard, Hajinski organized a contest among the architects in Baku. However, since most of the city's 30 architects were busy designing mansions for oil barons, only three submitted plans for it. The winning design was titled "Zvezda" (Star) and featured a bathing house, luxurious restaurant and a dozen pavilions. The design specified that wastewater would be collected in a separate manifold instead of being discharged directly into the Caspian (which is the case today). Work was completed in 1911.

Until the early 20th century, the avenue had mansions on one side and seafront on the other. There were no trees. Tons and tons of fertile soil were imported to enrich the soil quality. Baku's Mayor, R. R. Hoven, supported by the richest industrialists, passed a decree in the 1880s saying that all ships entering Baku harbors from Iran had to bring fertile soil with them. In reality, this was a kind of "tax" or "duty" imposed for the right to use the harbor and load up with oil. Within a very short time, enough soil was deposited, and the parks that characterize the city's seafront today were developed.

At the new Baku Bathing House, visitors could take a swim while visiting the Boulevard. This bathing house was closed in the late 1950s due to poor maintenance and the bay's polluted water.

The improved Boulevard stretched from what is now the SOCAR Circle to the luxurious cinema, restaurant and the casino that was called "Phenomenon", designed by Polish architect Józef Plośko in 1912.

=== Soviet Period ===
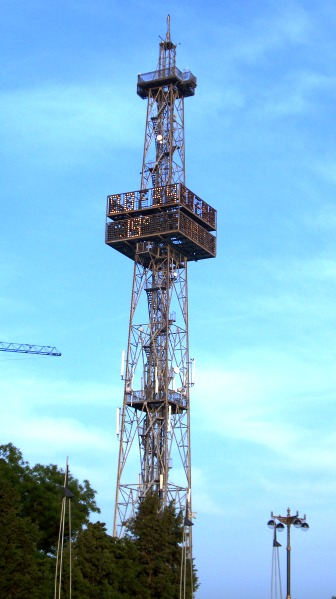
The parachute tower.

During the Soviet period, the casino was converted to a Puppet Theater, a function it still serves today. Subsequently, the Boulevard was extended up to the Baku International Sea Trade Port.

In 1936, a Parachute tower was built and used for extreme activities. However, the tower stopped functioning after a fatal accident in the 1960s, which led to the ultimate ban of parachuting from the tower. To this day, the tower is considered one of the landmarks of the boulevard.

The Boulevard developed further after the construction of Bahar and Mirvari cafes, summer cinema and other leisure attractions during 1950-1960s.

In 1970, the boulevard was expanded to both eastward and westward.

In the 1980s, the area was mismanaged and maintenance was neglected. The situation further deteriorated as the level of the sea began to rise so high that many of the trees and shrubs in the park started dying off due to the salinity of the water. At present, once again, the Caspian sea level is going back down.

=== Post-Independence ===
In 1999, the boulevard was proclaimed a National Park by Heydar Aliyev, former president of Azerbaijan. This status also helped to mitigate the environmental concerns, such as cleanup of oil pollution from Caspian Sea oilfields. Until 2009, there were 28 entertainment attractions in boulevard's amusement park. However, due to safety reasons, old attractions were replaced by new carousels and rides from Italy and Germany.

In 2008, the Parachute Tower was reconstructed and started to display wind speed, time, date, air and sea water temperature.

The boulevard contains an amusement park, yacht club and musical fountain, and various statues and monuments. The park is popular with dog-walkers and joggers, and is convenient for tourists, being adjacent to the newly built International Center of Mugham and musical fountain.

The boulevard marked it is 100th anniversary in 2009 as the specific date of it is creation is still unknown.

== Landmarks ==
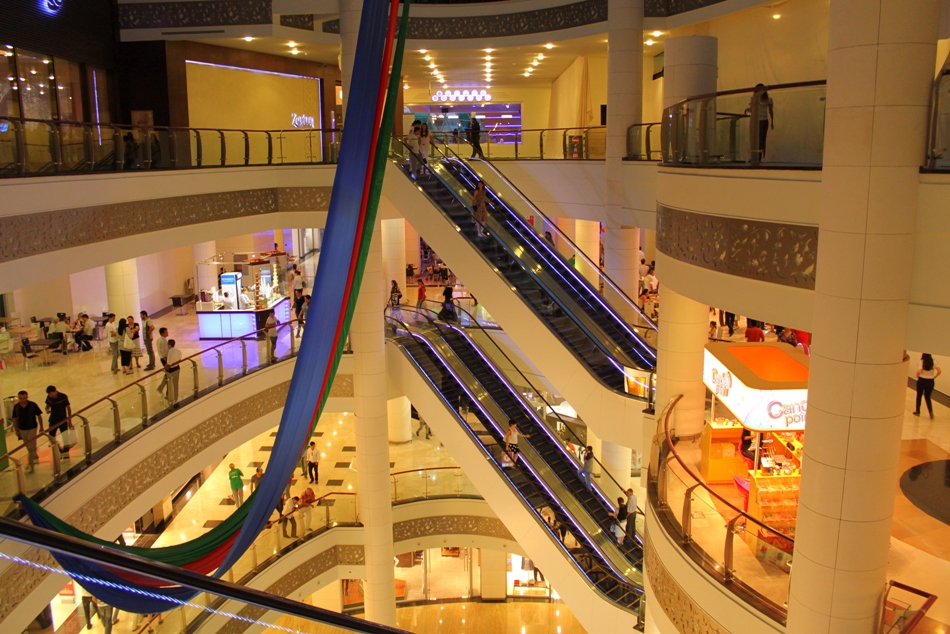
Inside of Park Bulvar shopping mall.

In 2010, a multi-story shopping mall Park Bulvar, Baku Business Centre and 5D cinema were opened on this promenade as part of the Government's regeneration policy to boost shopping and leisure in Baku.

In 2012, after Azerbaijan's victory in Eurovision Song Contest 2011, the boulevard extended towards Bayil settlement, where National Flag Square unveiled. Confirmed by the Guinness Book of Records, the flag flies on a pole 162 meters high and measures 70 by 35 meters, which makes it the world's highest flag. Baku Crystal Hall, which hosted Eurovision Song Contest 2012, is located next to it.

In 2014, the 60-metre (197 ft) tall Baku Ferris Wheel opened in the new section of the Boulevard.

In 2014, the new building of the Azerbaijan Carpet Museum was constructed at the Boulevard.

In 2015, Stone Chronicle Museum, “XX-XXI Century Azerbaijani painting” Museum and "Yarat" Contemporary Art Center were opened at the Boulevard. Additionally, opening ceremonies of Water Sports Palace and White City Boulevard were held in 2015.

In 2016, the new section of the Boulevard saw the opening of Baku's first open-air cinema.

== Seaside Boulevard Office ==
Seaside Boulevard Office was established under the Cabinet of Ministers according to the Decree of the President of Azerbaijan on January 10, 2008 in order to restore the natural landscape of the boulevard, maintain its historical appearance, develop the area's rich flora, protect the boulevard, and ensure the implementation of social and cultural events.

The Chairman Of the Seaside Boulevard Office is Ilgar Mustafayev since January 2016.

== Social history ==
The square has often been the scene of public meetings, cultural gatherings, celebrations, ceremonies, parades, concerts and has lately become the venue for the city's extensive New Year celebrations.

== Gallery ==
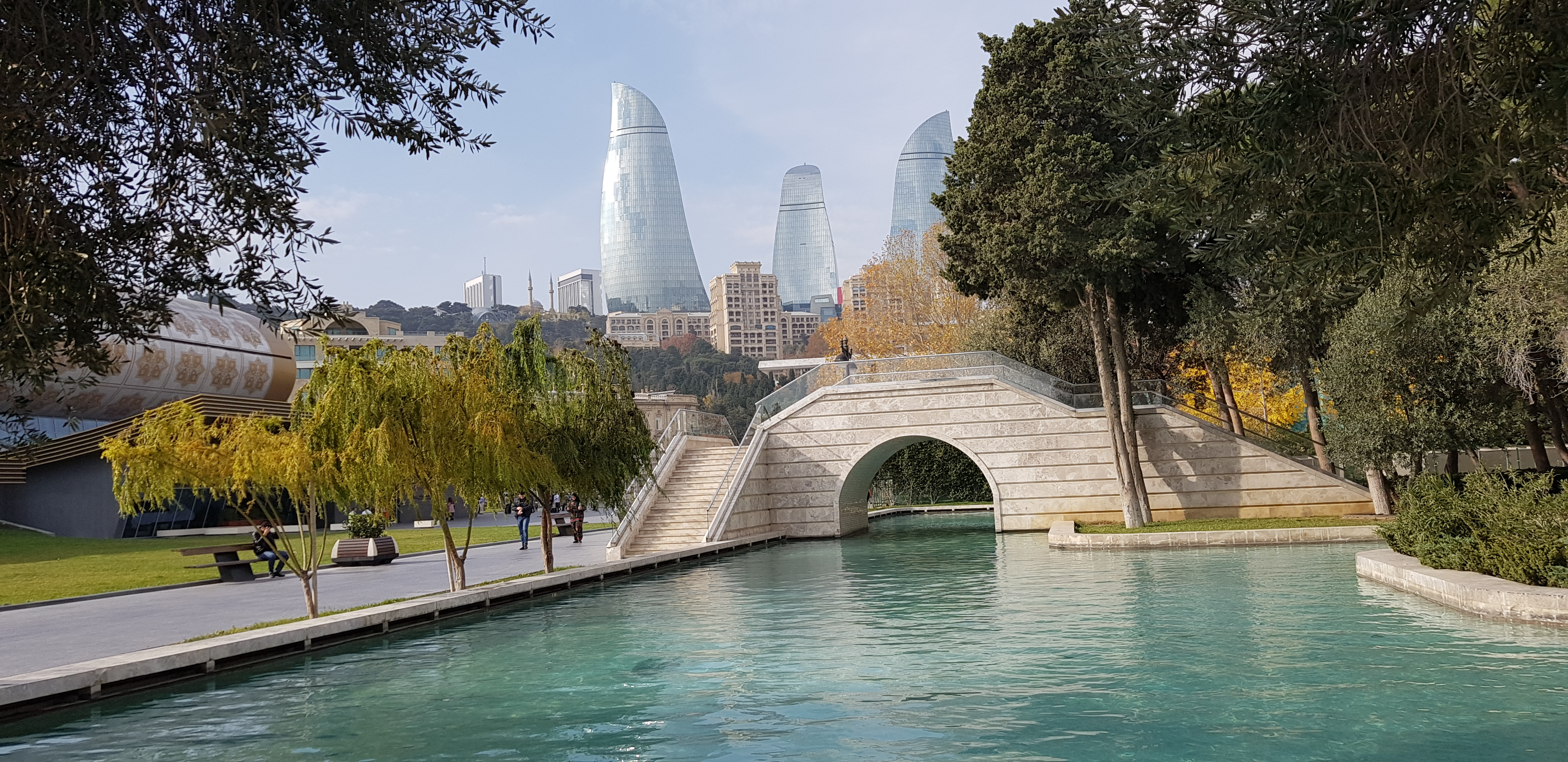
Baku Boulevard, Little Venice.

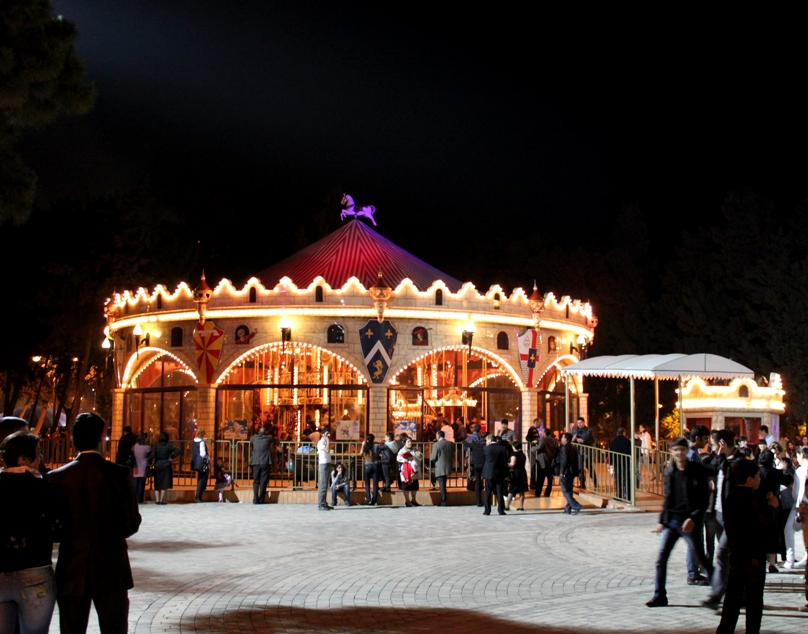
Kids attraction

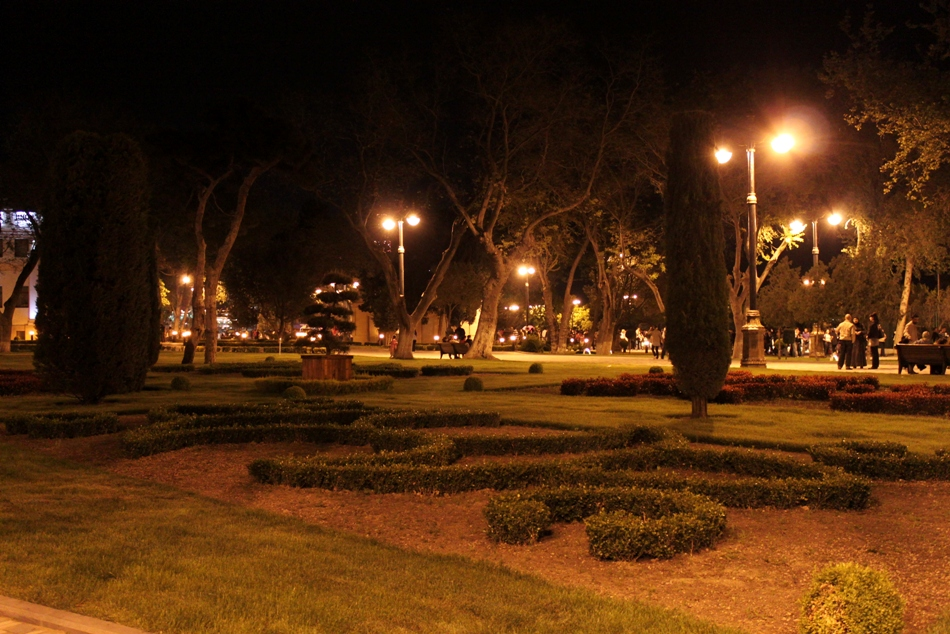
Boulevard at night

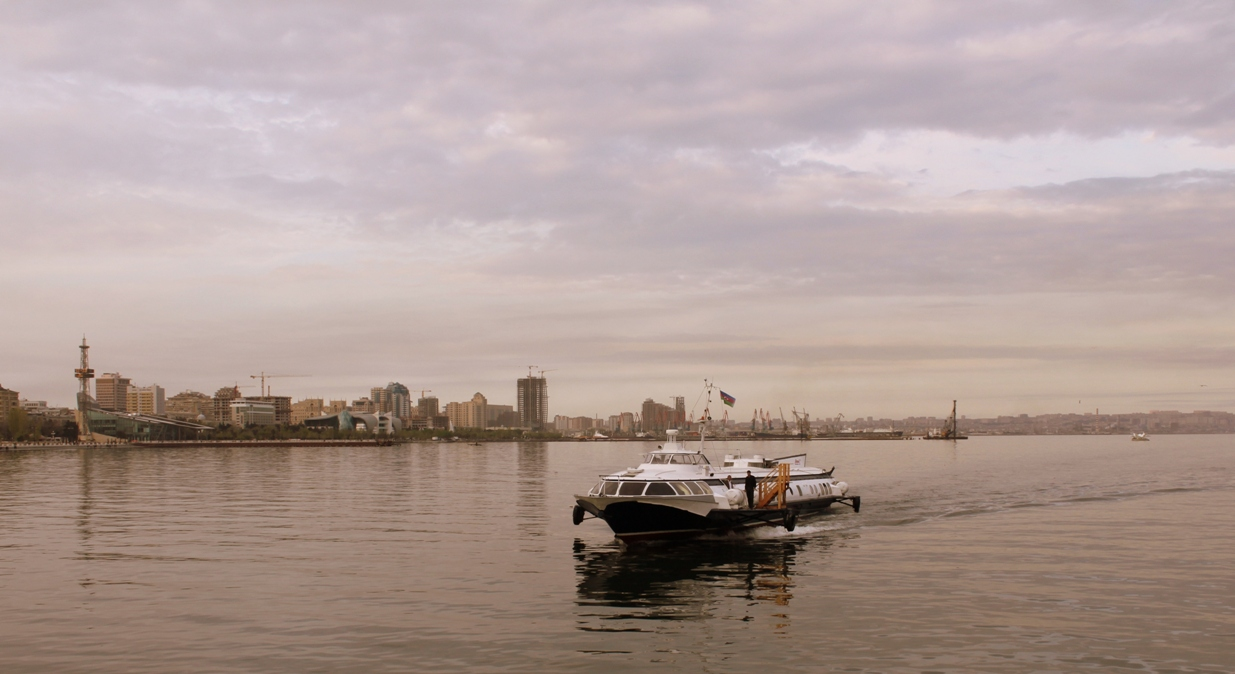
Caspian Coast

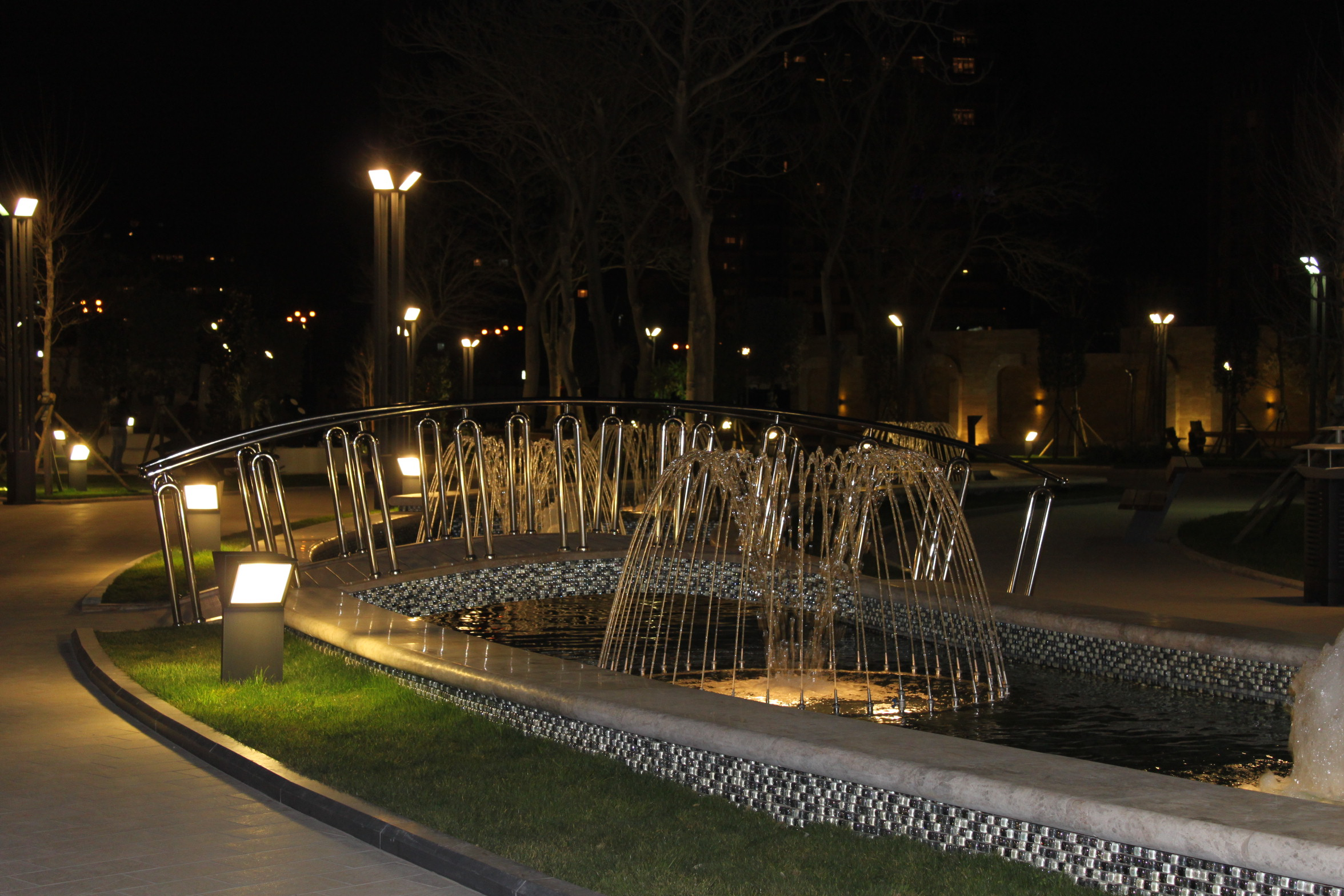
Fountains in boulevard

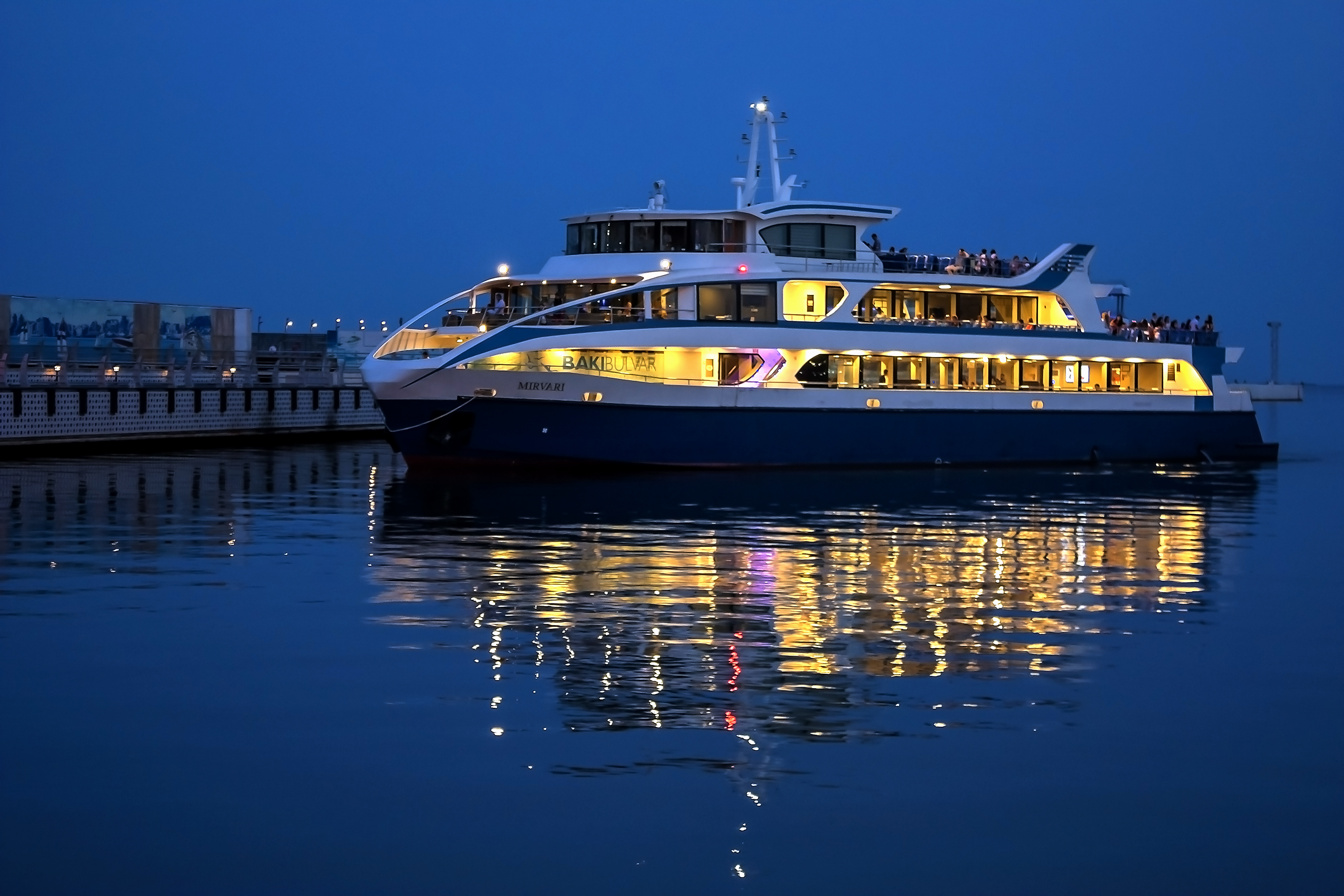
Pleasure boat in the bay of Baku, Azerbaijan

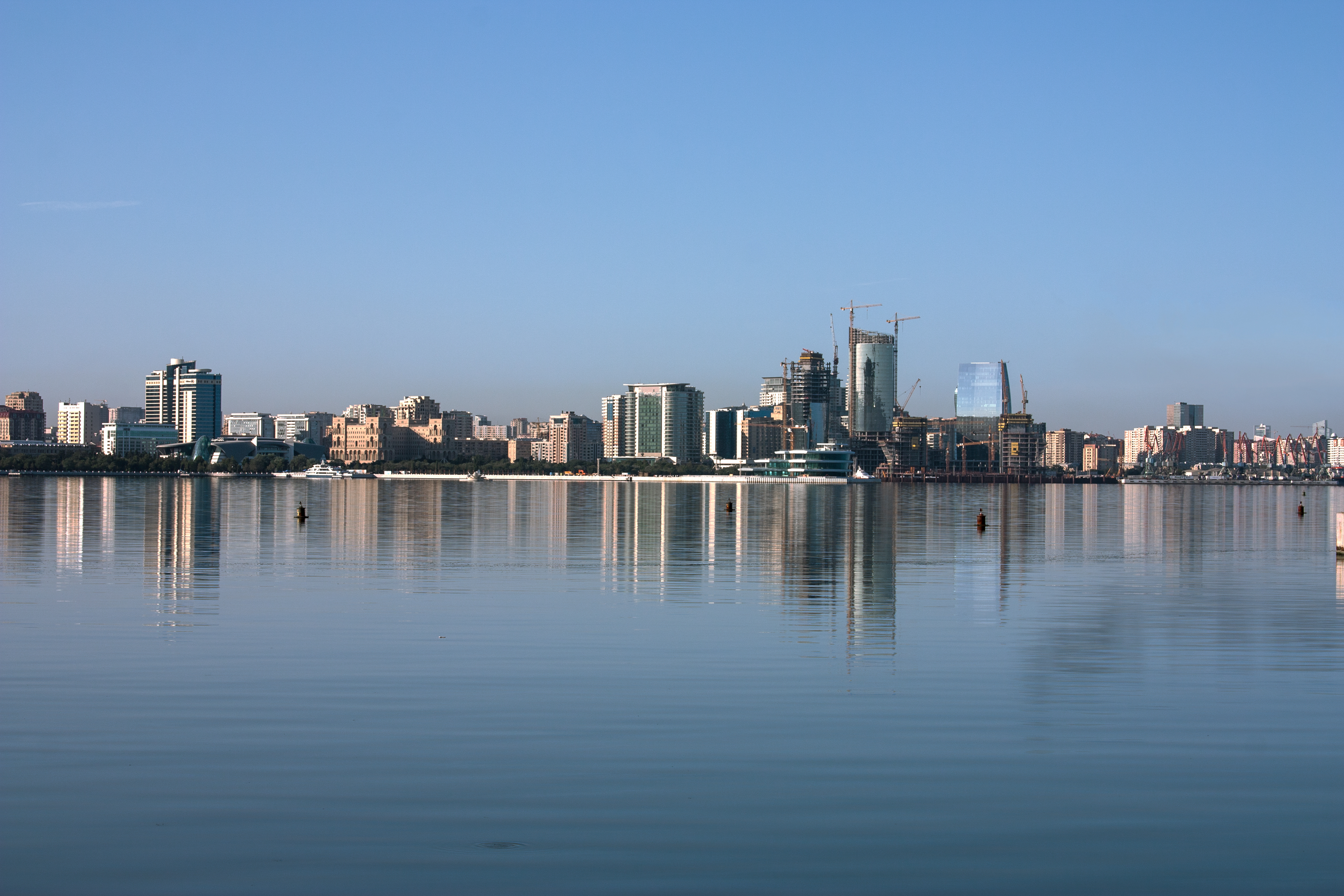
A view of the Baku bay, Azerbaijan

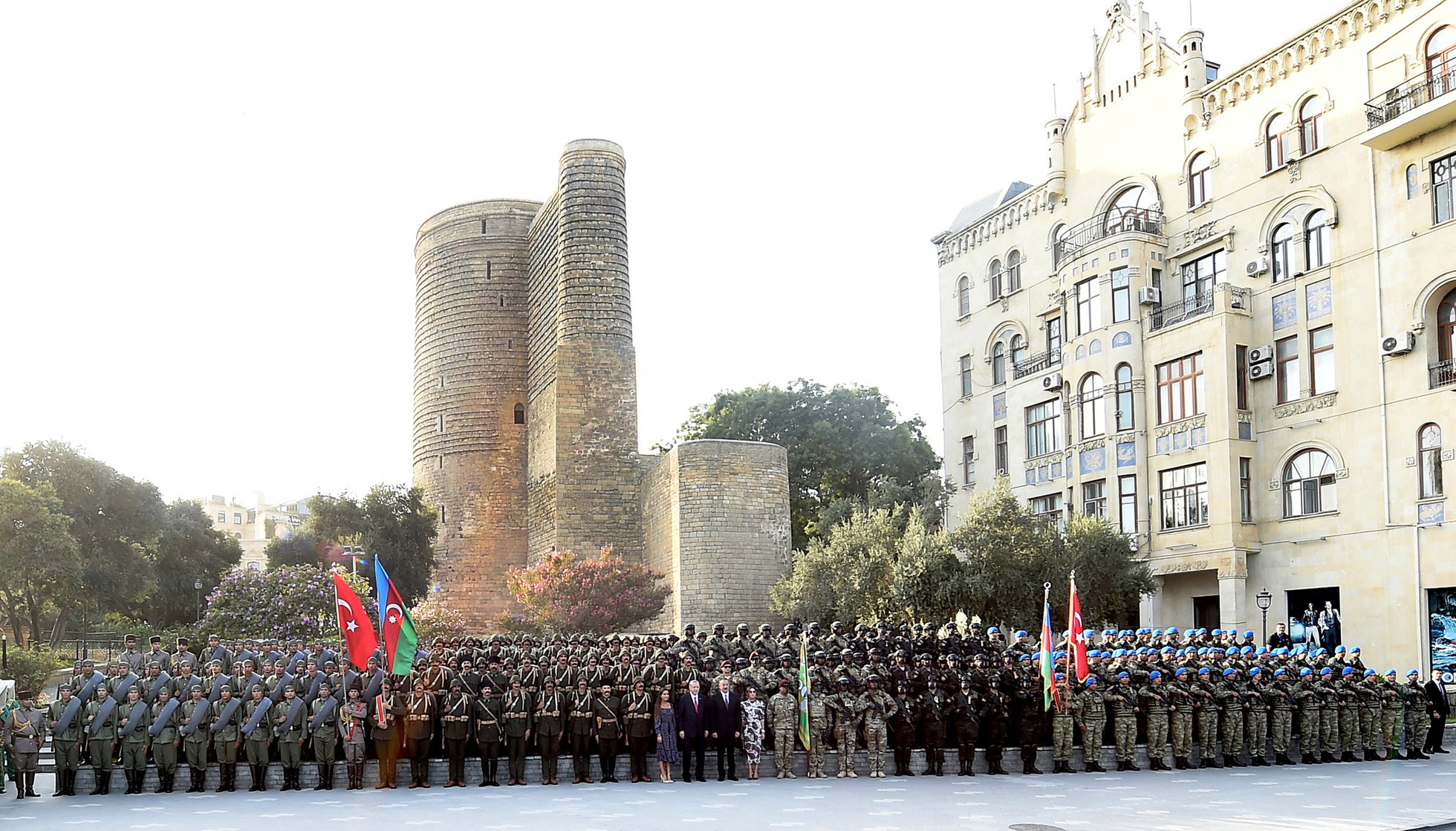
Ilham Aliyev and Recep Tayyip Erdogan posing with soldiers on the boulevard in 2018

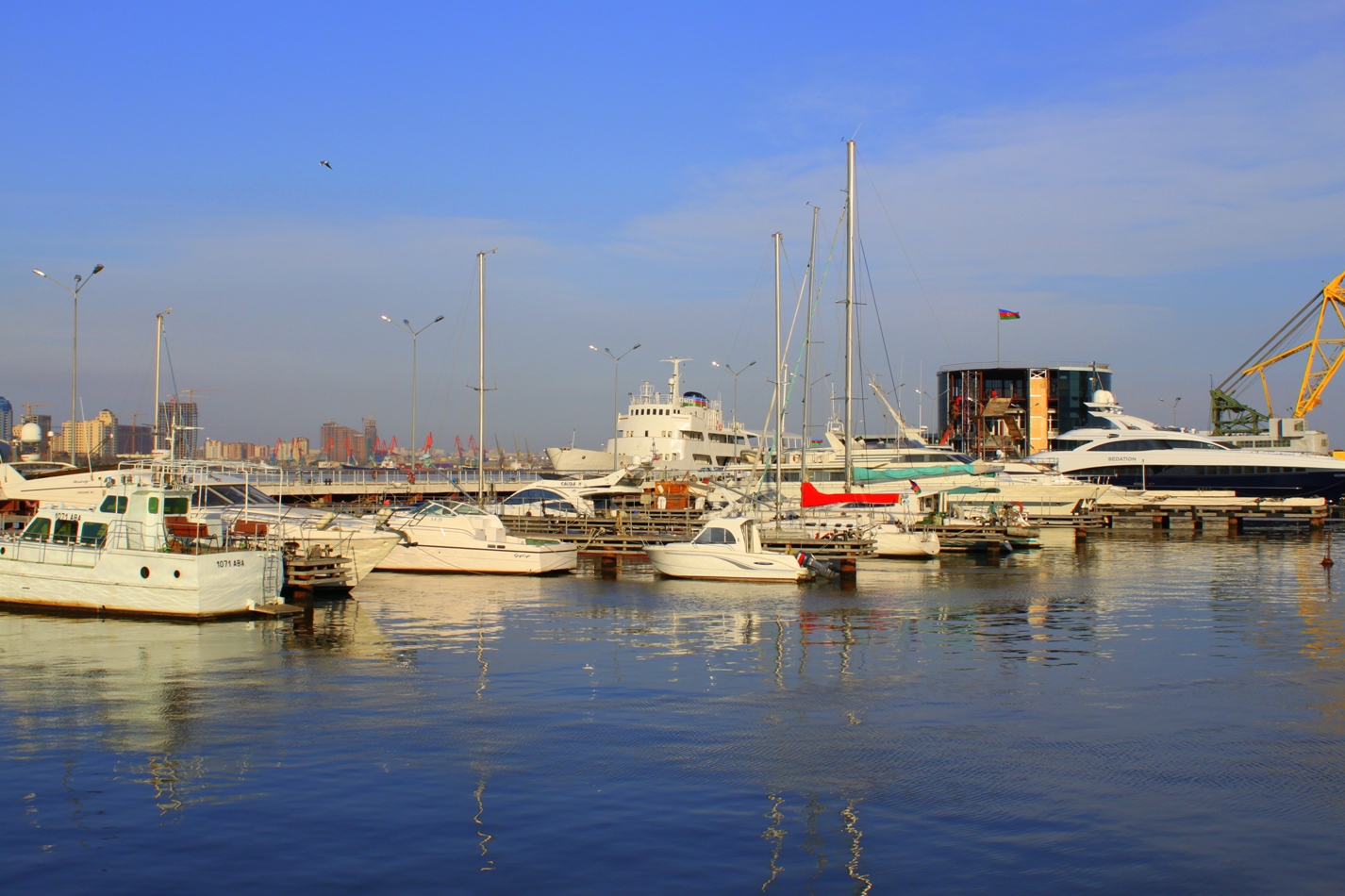
Baku Yacht Club

== See also ==
- Architecture in Baku
- Martyrs' Lane
- Fountains Square, Baku
- Azadliq Square, Baku
- Sumgait Boulevard
- Astara Boulevard
