= Baku Ferris Wheel =

Ferris Wheel in Baku, Azerbaijan

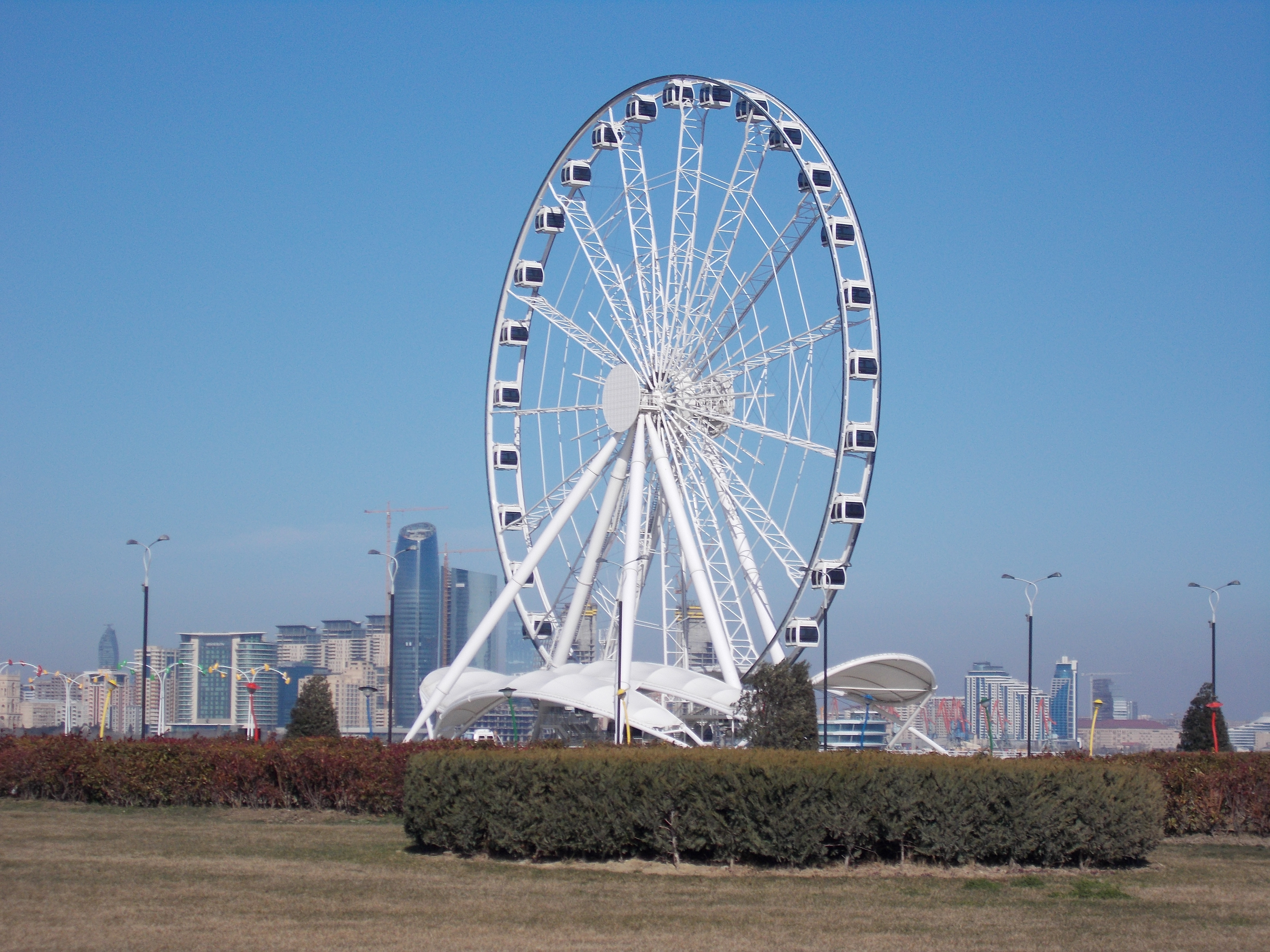
- The Baku Ferris Wheel in 15 February 2016
- Interactive map of the Baku Ferris Wheel area

General information
- Status: Completed
- Type: Ferris wheel
- Location: Baku, Azerbaijan
- Coordinates: 40.354717°N 49.837584°E
- Construction started: September 2013
- Completed: 31 January 2015
- Opened: 10 March 2014; 12 years ago (first passengers carried); 12 March 2014; 12 years ago (opened to general public)
- Cost: €350 million

Height
- Height: 60 metres (197 ft)

Baku Ferris Wheel, also known as the Baku Eye and Devil's Wheel (Azerbaijani: Şeytan çarxı), is a ferris wheel on Baku Boulevard in the Seaside National Park of Baku, capital of Azerbaijan. The wheel was built by the Dutch company Dutch Wheels. It was opened on 10 March 2014 by Azerbaijani president Ilham Aliyev, and opened to the public two days later.

The wheel is 60 metres (200 ft) tall and has 30 enclosed cabins, each holding eight people, except for two VIP cabins, each carrying four people. Each full rotation takes approximately 30 to 40 minutes. The cabins of the Ferris Wheel are equipped with air conditioning. Small monitors have been set up so that passengers can spend their time entertaining. The doors of the attraction are opened and closed in a centralised manner in order to ensure safety. At the same time, with this purpose, all the cabinets are covered with transparent glass constructions. There are special ladders for each cabinet, which is designed to facilitate the evacuation of passengers in the case of any malfunction in the attraction. Riders of the ferris wheel have the opportunity to see the Baku Bay, the National Flag Square, the Crystal Hall, and the city as a whole.

== See also ==
- Baku Boulevard
