= Elektra Events Hall =

Concert and events venue in Baku, Azerbaijan

- Entrance of Elektra Events Hall (2026)
- Interactive map of Elektra Events Hall
- Address: National Flag Square complex, Bayil
- Location: Baku, Azerbaijan
- Coordinates: 40.33915°N 49.84087°E
- Capacity: 3,000 (standing); 600 (theatre); 250 (banquet)
- Type: Concert and events venue

Construction
- Opened: 5 June 2015

Website
- events1.tilda.ws

Elektra Events Hall is a multi-purpose concert and events venue in Baku, Azerbaijan, located in the National Flag Square complex on the Bayil seaside boulevard. Opened in 2015, it hosts concerts, festivals, conferences, exhibitions, and corporate and private events.

== History ==
The venue opened on 5 June 2015 with a concert by American rapper DMX, his first performance in Azerbaijan. During the 2015 European Games in Baku, the venue housed the "Azerbaijani House", which held daily events honouring the day's winners.

== Facilities ==
The main hall holds up to 3,000 people and can be reconfigured as a 600-seat theatre or a 250-seat banquet hall; a VIP area on the second floor holds over 200 guests.

== Events ==
On 1 February 2026 the Youth Foundation of Azerbaijan held the "GəncLAND" youth festival there to mark Azerbaijani Youth Day.

According to the venue, performers have included DMX, Ace of Base, Richard Galliano, Miri Yusif, Röya, Timati and Basta.
