= Parachute tower in Baku =

Tower in baku (Azerbaijan)

Coordinates: 40°22′07″N 49°50′38″E

Parachute tower
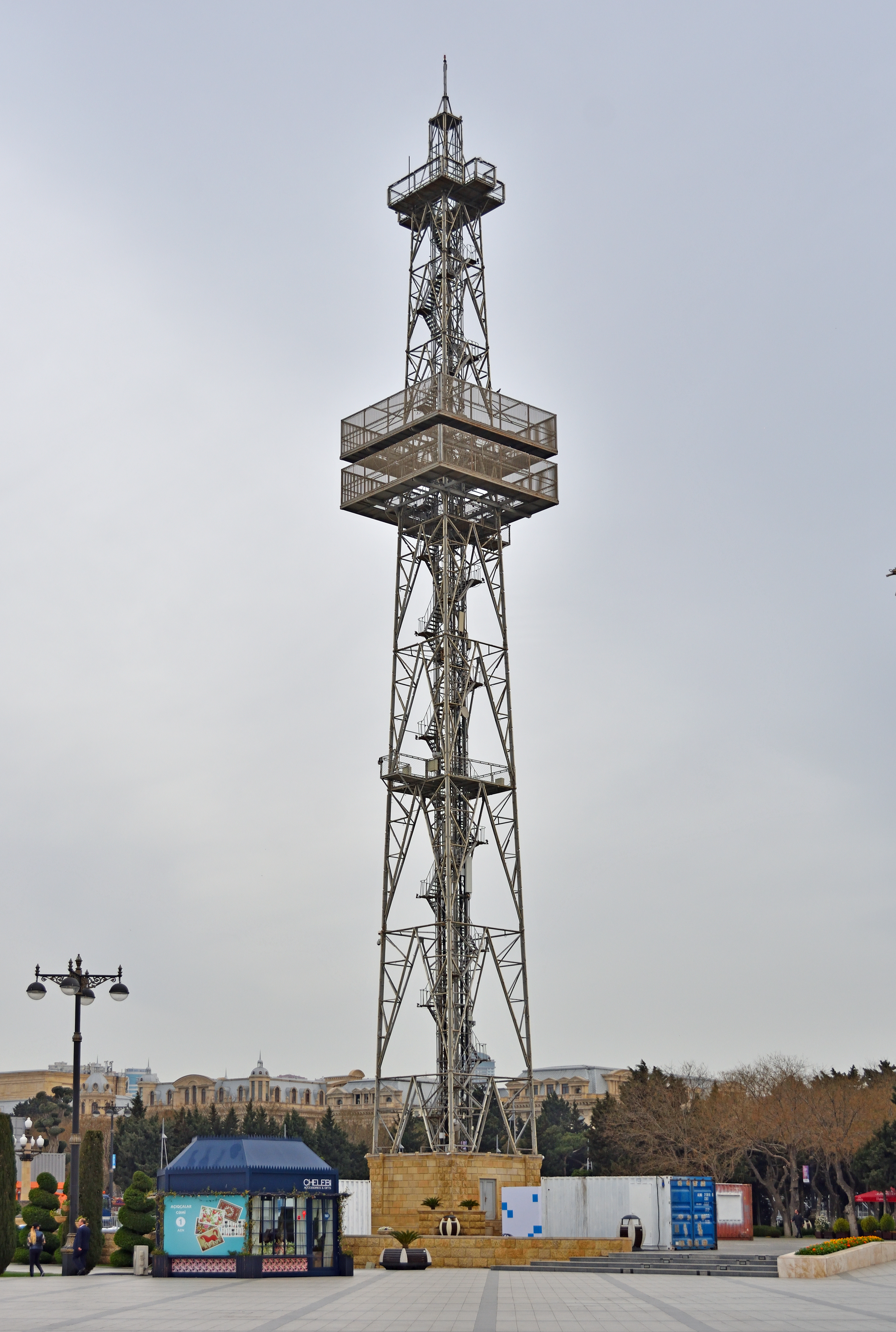
- Interactive map of the Parachute tower area

General information
- Location: Baku, Azerbaijan
- Construction started: 1936
- Owner: Administration of Baku Boulevard

Height
- Height: 75 m

Design and construction
- Architect: Specialists of “Bakinskiy rabochiy” (Baku worker) machinery plant

Parachute tower in Baku is a construction of 75 meters height located in Baku Boulevard and which was built in form of derrick. It was opened in 1936 and is one of the tourist attractions of the capital of Azerbaijan.

== History ==
=== Opening ceremony of the tower ===
In the 1940s, there were functioning parachute towers in cities of the USSR, which were constructed in parks and in pedestrian areas. Then, the parachute tower (75 metres high) was constructed in the “Bakinskiy Rabochiy” (Baku worker) machinery plant on the initiative of Baku City Council by specialists of design office. At that time, such complex metal construction was not common, but Baku was distinguished for its strong technological basis in production of metal constructions.

The opening ceremony of the tower was held on April 28, 1936, coinciding with the sixteenth anniversary of establishment of the Azerbaijan Soviet Socialist Republic.

=== Technical parameters ===
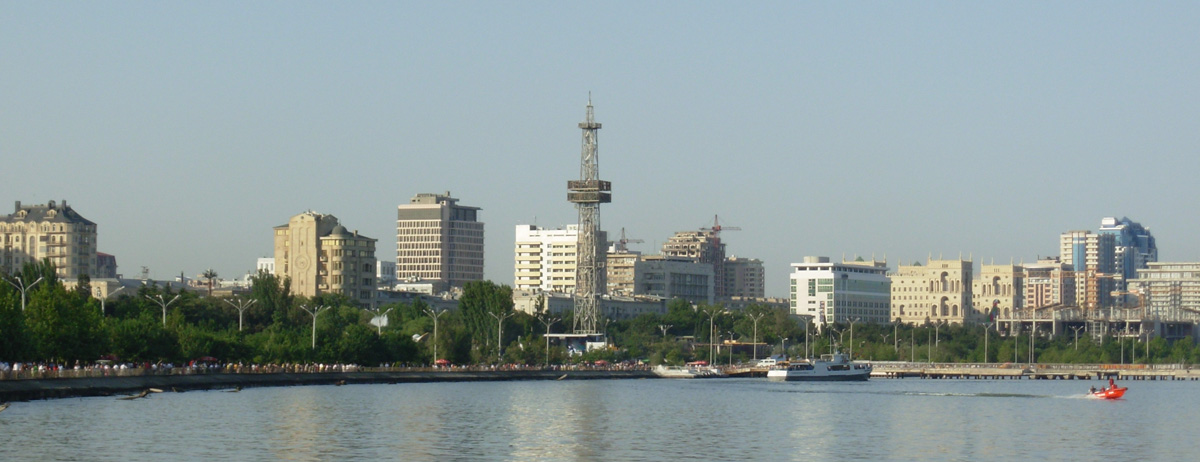
View of Baku Boulevard (the parachute tower in the center)

The parachute tower was open for use from anyone. Jumps from parachute for military preparation of youth were also held there. There were four marks on the tower, indicating the ten, twenty, twenty-five and sixty metre points respectively. The lowest mark was the safest, but jumping from the highest point was not permissible to everyone.

Jumps from the tower were utmost secured, because a parachute had constant cupola which didn't change and fold. Risk of nondisclosure of the parachute was absent. The parachute was attached to metal circle and looked like a shade on which were hanged shrouds with belts.

Anybody could jump from the tower (within a certain height restriction), and as such there was no need for a 'special outfit'. Seat belts embraced hips and large bunch of belts came out of it. A rope was located in centre of shade which went through the winch system and weights hanged throughout its height. If a fat man jumped, the parachute worked as a brake, because the cupola took the part of weight's load on it.

=== Change of the purpose ===
The tower was used for a parachuting until one jumper was tragically killed in the 1960s. After this, the parachute tower was forced to change its profile; it is now an electronic board flaring with neon lamps, which shows the time, date, temperature and strength of the wind.
