= Paster (rapper) =

Azerbaijani rapper and songwriter

- Born: Pərviz Quluzadə; 18 October 1991 (age 35); Baku
- Other names: 5.9; Nifrət
- Years active: 2009-present
- Musical career
- Genres: Hip hop; rap
- Label: Synaps

Pərviz Quluzadə, better known as Paster (born 18 October 1991, Baku), is an Azerbaijani rapper and songwriter.

== Life and career ==
Paster was born on October 18, 1991, in Baku. He began engaging with hip-hop as an amateur at the age of 10. His professional career started in 2009 with the track "Artıq sabahdır," which he performed as part of the group Difai. During his time with Difai, Paster released tracks such as "Mən gedirəm," "Cavab ver," "Newschool," "Həyatın oyunu," "Marshal ve biz," "Forever," "Smackdown," "Music Note," "Love and peace," "Küçələr bizimdir," and "Huk."

In 2012, he left Difai and joined "All in Label" and "Synaps Production." During this period, he created tracks like "Klick Klick Bau," "Pis teatr," "Like 10," "Meqabaytlar," "TTM," "Fransızsayağı işgəncə," "North west," "Bang bang," "Demo," "X noise," "Label 3," "Ağır metal," and "İri çaplı." Paster collaborated with notable rappers such as Uran, Xpert, and Sansar Salvo during this time.

In 2016, a new phase began in Paster's career. His track "1st Class," performed alongside Dost and OD, gained significant attention. In 2017, Paster released his debut album, Puldan Baha. In 2018, he produced the single "Dorian Gray" and, alongside Xpert, went on tour across various regions of the country. Towards the end of 2019, Paster created a major buzz in the country with his rap battle performance as part of the "Kəllə-Kəlləyə" project.

In 2020, the "Bina" album was released online via YouTube, and the 5-track album quickly gained significant attention. He also released the track "Yaşma," dedicated to the victory in the Second Nagorno-Karabakh War. In 2021, Paster introduced the track "Pulumu doğ." In 2022, Paster collaborated with Rashad Dagly, an acclaimed artist in the Azerbaijani genre of Meykhana, on the track ''Şir''. This cross-genre collaboration created a sensation across the country. In 2023, he released his album Çirkin, followed by a mini-album titled Lotos with RZZA in 2024.

On December 26, 2019, the Binagadi District Court sentenced Paster to 30 days in prison after he was found guilty under Articles 510 (petty hooliganism) and 535.1 (failure to obey a lawful request of the police) of the Administrative Offenses Code. Some public activists speculated that his arrest was related to his song "Gang," in which he referenced "Pasha Bank" on December 9. On January 21, 2020, Paster completed his sentence and was released from custody during the day.

== Discography ==
=== Studio albums ===
- Puldan baha (2016)
- Bina (2020)
- Çirkin (2023)
- Lotos (2024)

=== Singles ===
- "Artıq sabahdır" (2009)
- "Mən gedirəm"
- "Cavab ver"
- "Newschool"
- "Heyatın oyunu"
- "Marshal ve biz"
- "Forever"
- "Smackdown"
- "Music note"
- "Love and peace"
- "Küçələr bizimdir" (2013)
- "Huk"
- "Klick klick baau"
- "Pis teatr"
- "Like 10"
- "Meqabaytlar "
- "TTM "
- "Fransızsayağı işgəncə"
- "North west"
- "Bang bang"
- "Demo"
- "X noise"
- "Label 3"
- "Ağır metal"
- "İri çaplı"
- "1st class" (2016)
- "Dorian Gray" (2017)
- "Phenom" (2018)
- "Yolunda" (2019)
- "Gang" (2019)
- "Diss " (2020)
- "Ya indi, ya heç vaxt" (2020)
- "Gəzirəm" (2020)
- "Yenidən" (2020)
- "Chain" (2020)
- "Qayıt gəl" (2020)
- "Yaşma" (2020)
- "Pulumu doğ" (2021)
- "Bi skmə döül" (2021)
- "6 AM" (2022)
- "Ayka" (2022)
- "Six-Six" (2023)
- "LLC" (2023)
- "İgid Ölər, Adı Qalar" (2023)
- "Ömür kömür kimi" (2023)
- "Vid ver" (2023)

== Concerts ==
- Çirkin (2023, July 1) - Solo concert at Elektra Events Hall
- Bakı Tərpən (2023, September 9) - Solo concert at Elektra Events Hall
- Shut Down (2024, December 25) - Solo concert in Warsaw, Poland
