= Park Bulvar =

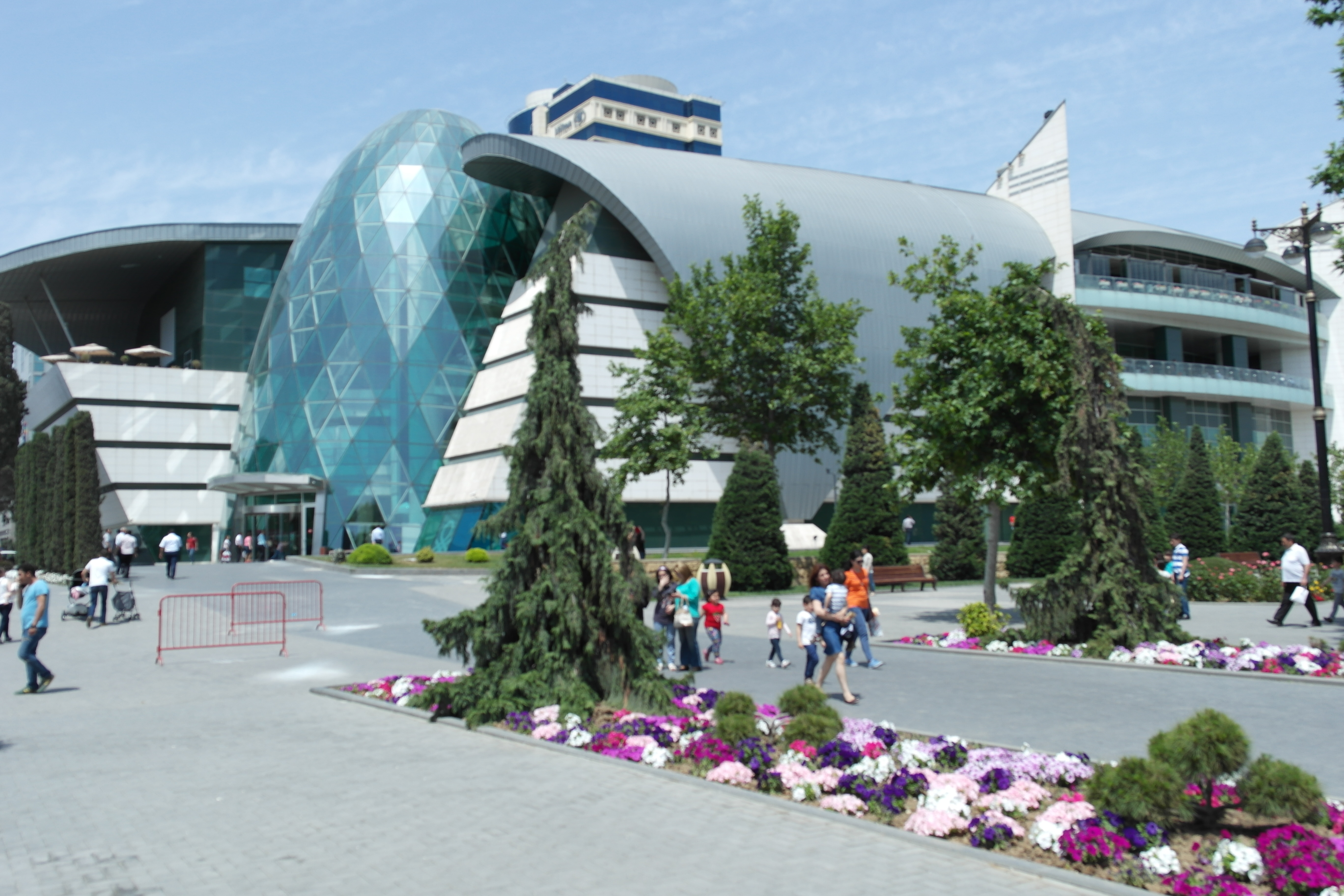
- Location: Baku Boulevard, Baku, Azerbaijan
- Coordinates: 40°22′15″N 49°50′59″E
- Opened: 20 July 2010; 16 years ago
- Developer: Baku Plaza Ltd
- Owner: Baku Plaza Ltd
- Num. of stores: 99
- Floor area: 17,000 m^{2} (180,000 sq ft)
- Floors: 6
- Parking: 550 spaces
- Website: parkbulvar.az/en

Park Bulvar (English: Park Boulevard) is a multi-story shopping mall located on Baku Boulevard in downtown Baku, Azerbaijan, in the city center.

Situated near the Government House of Baku, the mall spans four floors and includes two additional subterranean levels. Constructed by Baku Plaza Ltd. at a reported cost of about $41.5 million, the mall houses 99 businesses, including a supermarket, a cinema, a children's playground, and several restaurants that offer views of the Bay of Baku on the Caspian Sea.

The opening of Park Bulvar in 2010 was attended by President Ilham Aliyev and his family.
