= Stone Chronicle Museum =

- Azerbaijani: Daş salnamə muzeyi
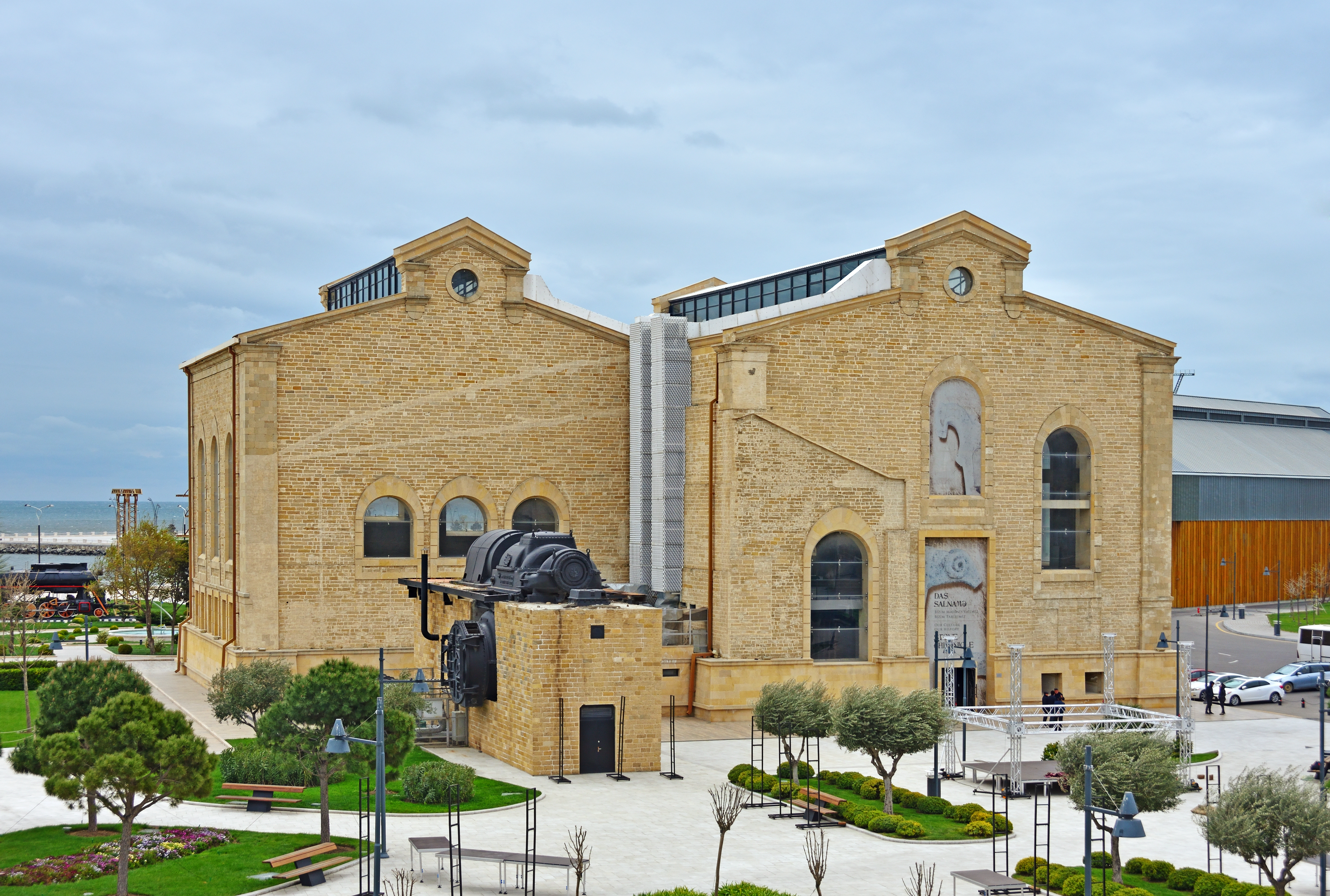
- Established: June 8, 2015; 11 years ago
- Location: Baku, Azerbaijan
- Coordinates: 40.340185°N 49.841216°E
- Type: History of Azerbaijan
- Collection size: 48000+
- Website: heydar-aliyev-foundation.org

Stone Chronicle Museum is a museum dedicated to the history of stone plastics in Azerbaijan. Many types of stone plastic are exhibited in the museum. The Stone Chronicle Museum, located on the National Flag Square, was created by the Heydar Aliyev Foundation. The most archaic features of moral life in Azerbaijan were found in plastic stone traditions.

== History ==
The museum is located in the building of the electric station constructed in 1901 and used for the energy supply of oil wells. In later period, the building was completely restored. After restoration works, it operates as Stone Chronicle Museum.

The opening of the museum took place on June 8, 2015. President of the Republic of Azerbaijan, Ilham Aliyev, President of the Heydar Aliyev Foundation, Mehriban Aliyeva and Vice President of the Foundation, Leyla Aliyeva got acquainted with the museum.

== Exhibition ==
Beside numerous examples of stone plastic discovered in different places of Azerbaijan, a large part of ancient exhibits a large part of ancient exhibits are made up of various household items with functional meaning and no decorations.

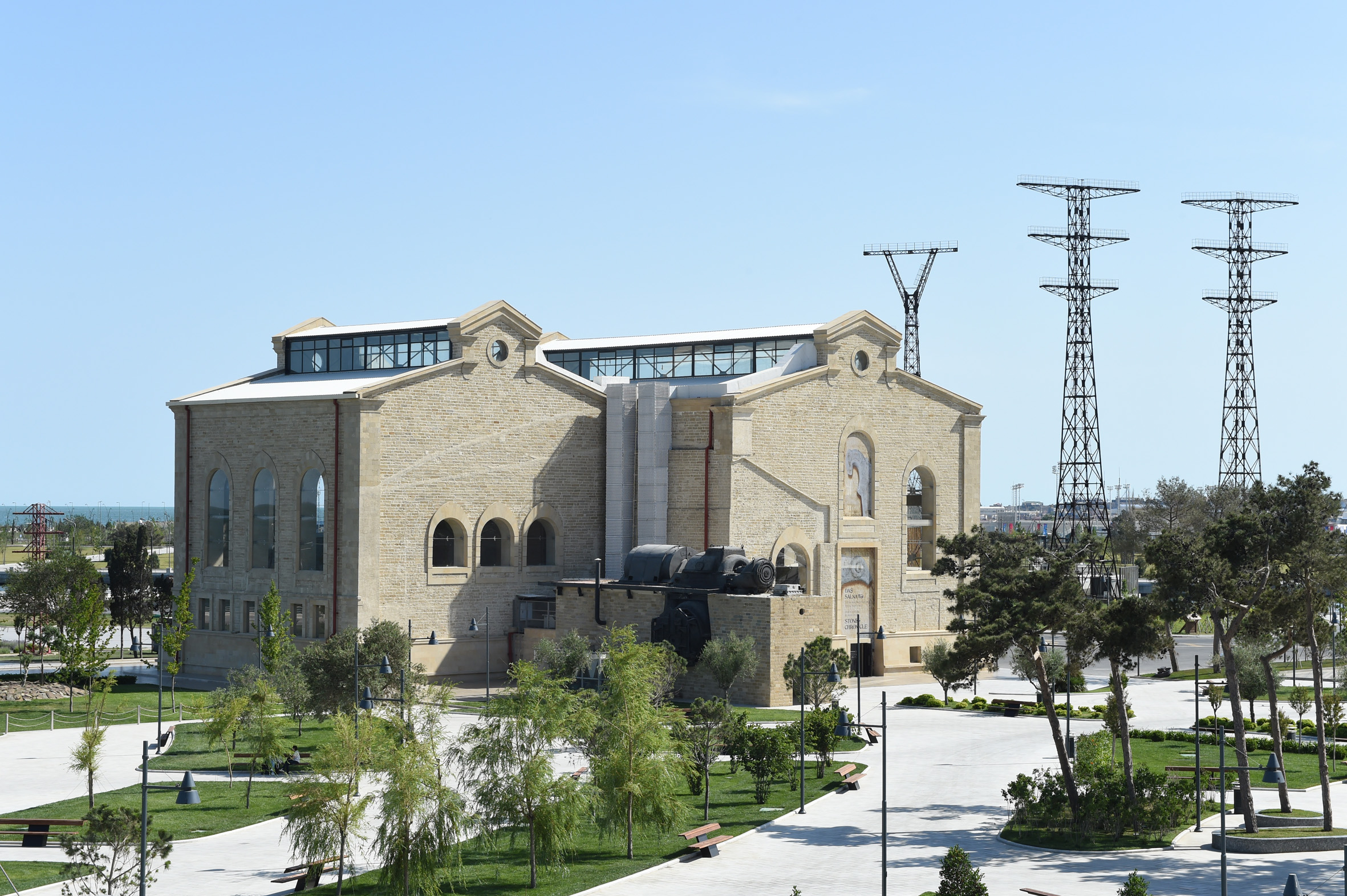
Stone Chronicle Museum June, 8 2015

The exposition of the "Stone Chronicle" exposition covers many types of stone plastic. Stone Chronicle Museum includes exhibits dedicated to the history of stone plastics in Azerbaijan brought from "Gobustan" and "Gala" preserves, as well as sculptor Huseyn Hagverdiyev's works.

The main part of the exposition is the tombstones belonging to the Middle Ages that are found in the Shirvan-Absheron zone. Painted and chest-shaped graves and gravestones give original information about various socio-political, social, cultural and ideological events of the Middle Ages.

== Gallery ==
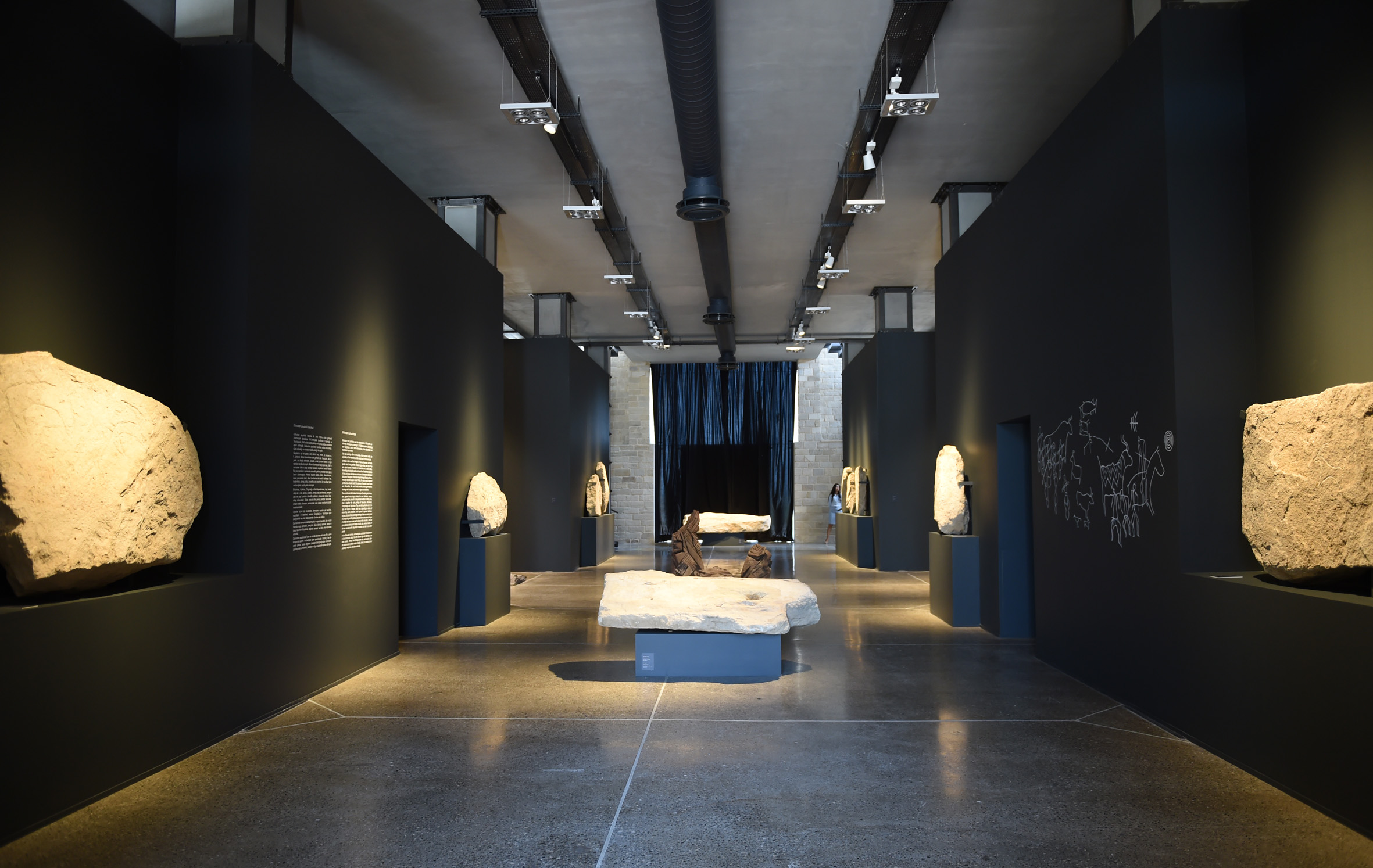

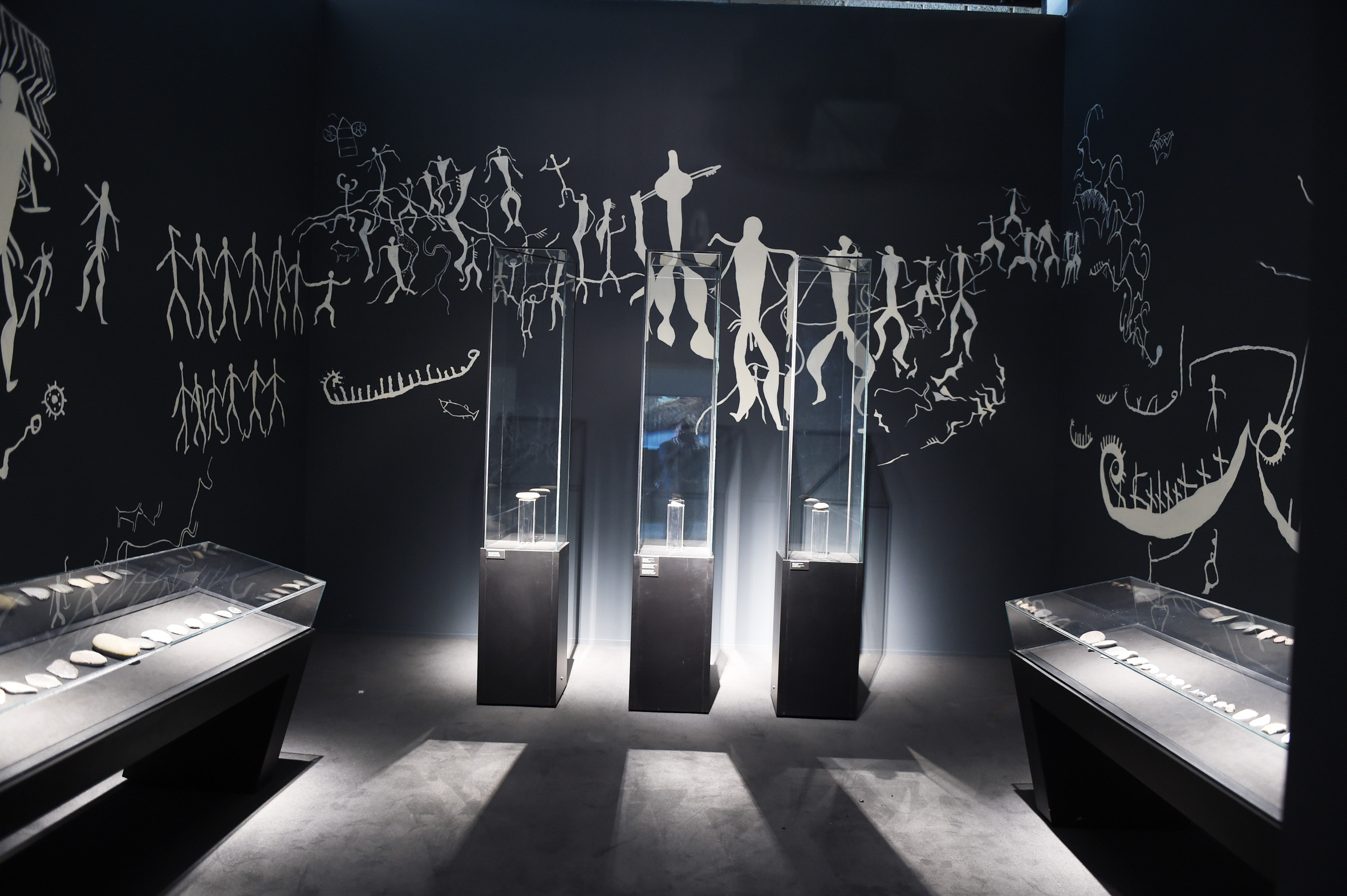

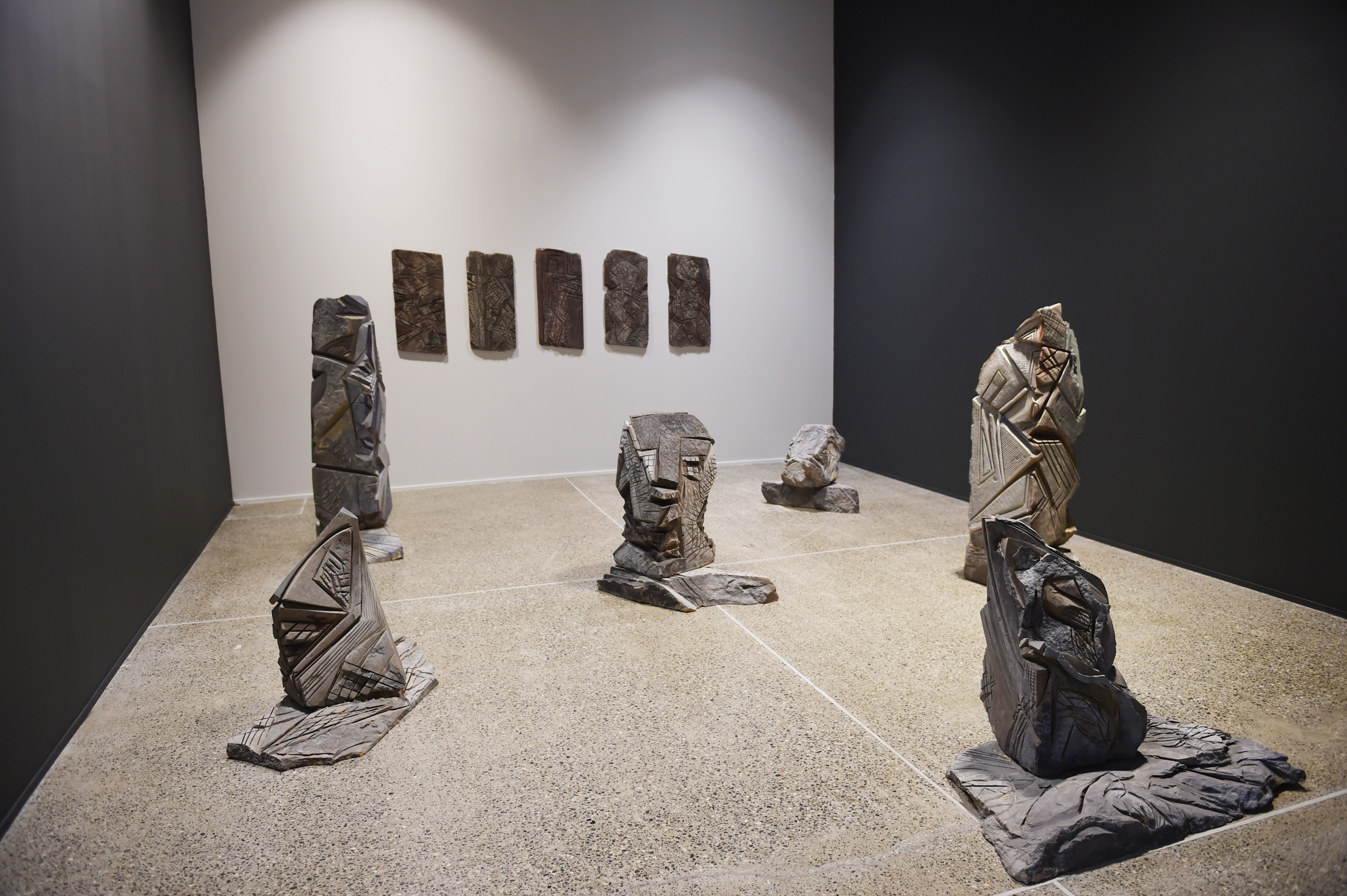

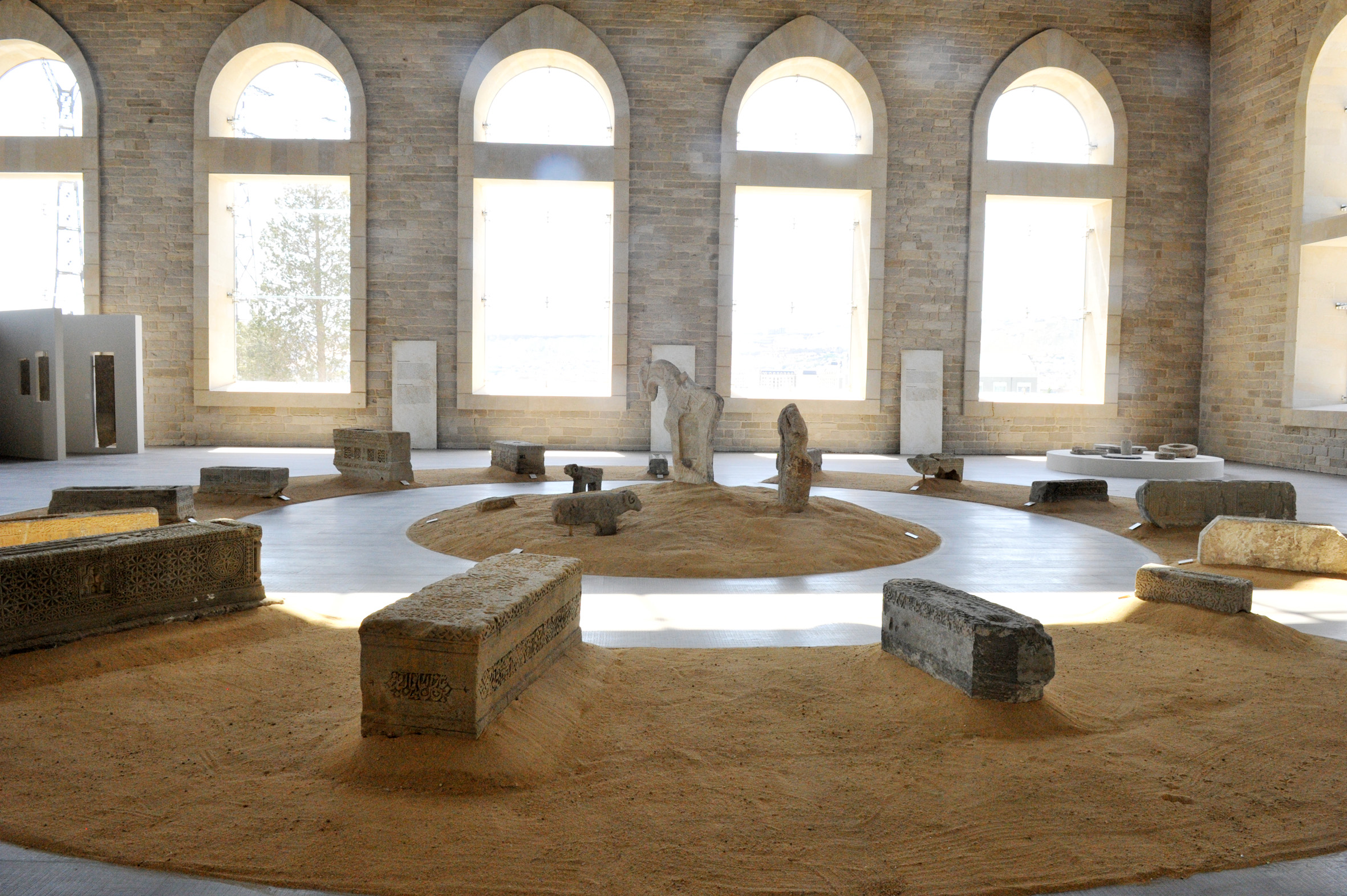

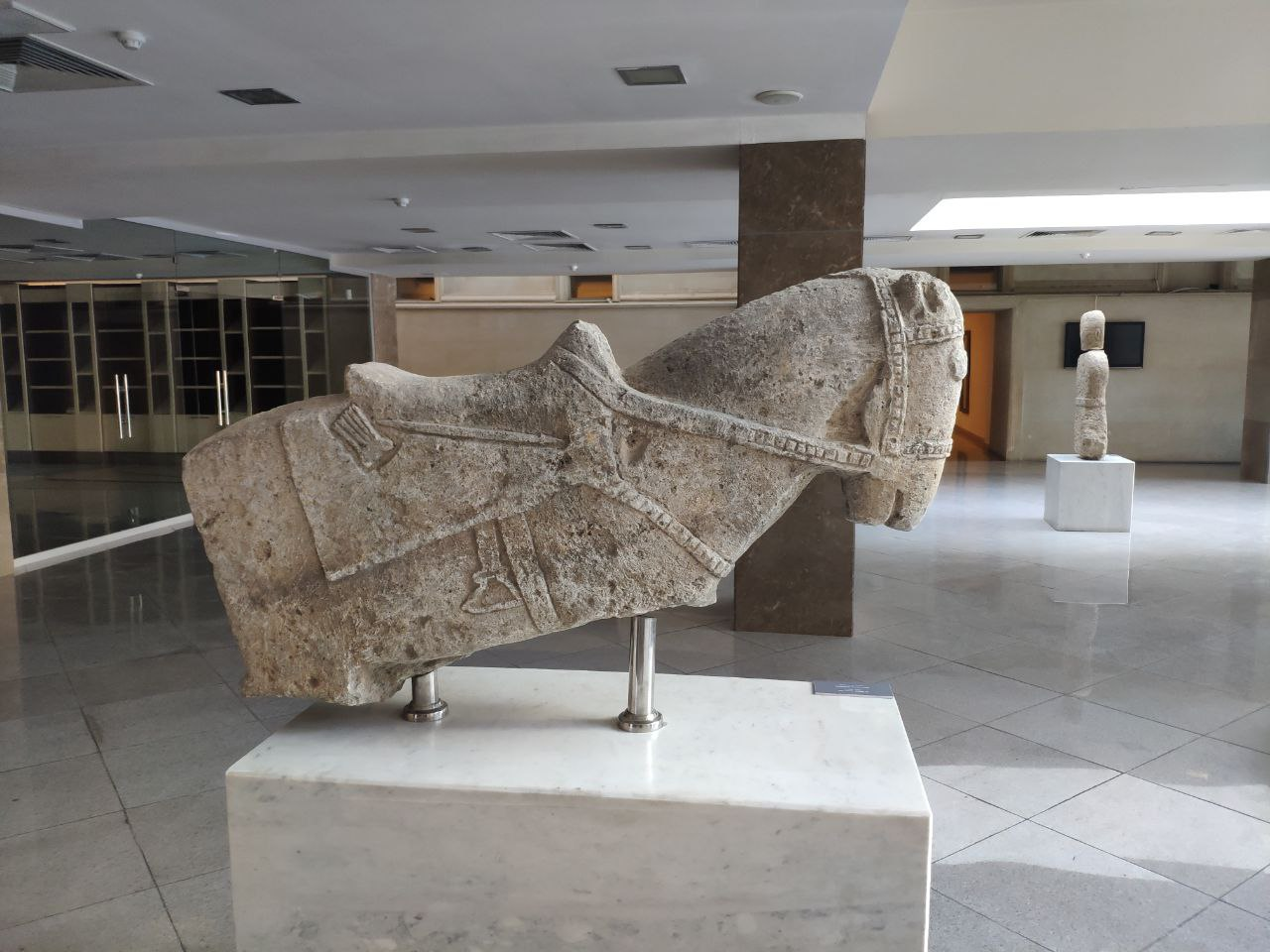

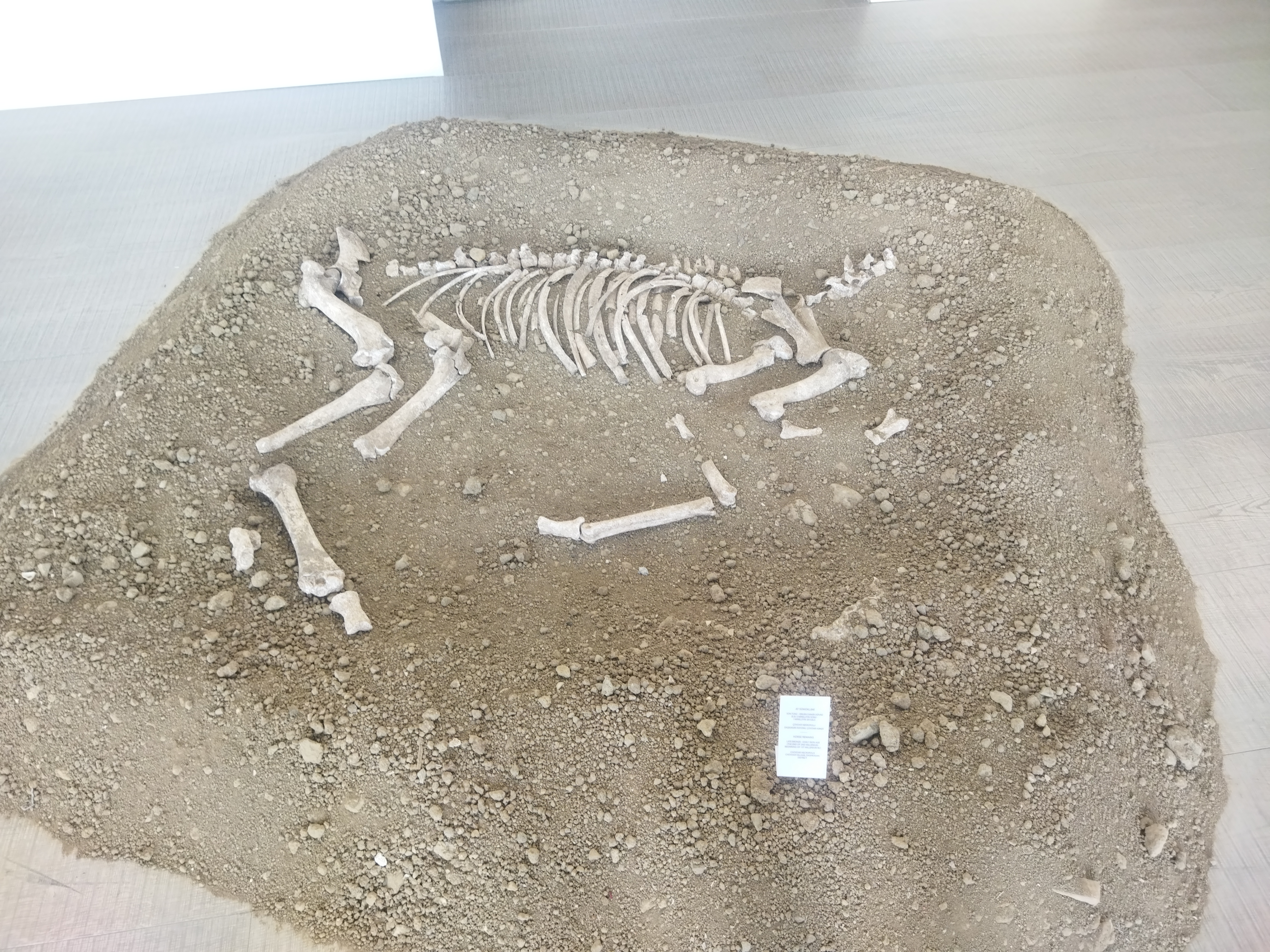

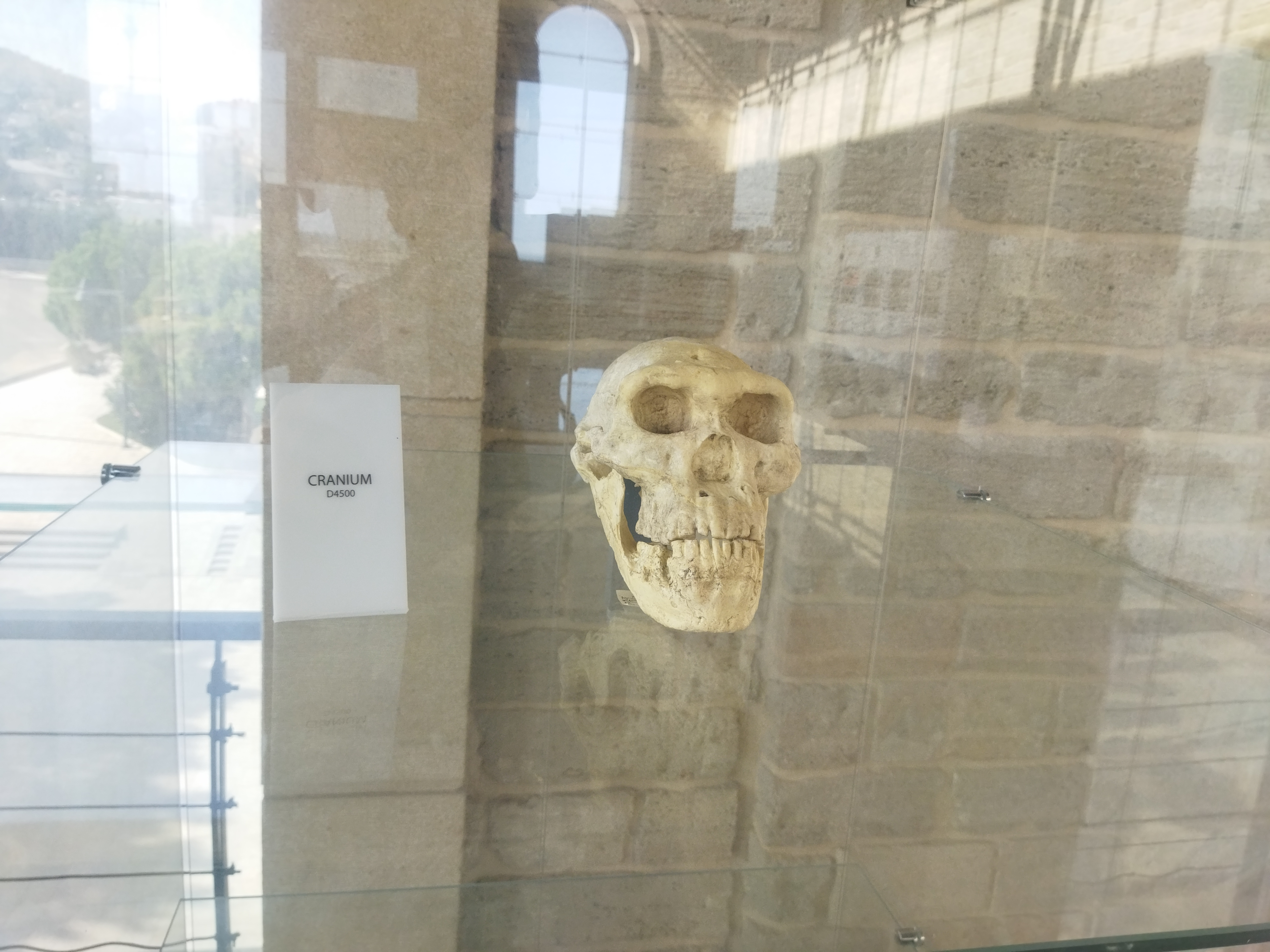

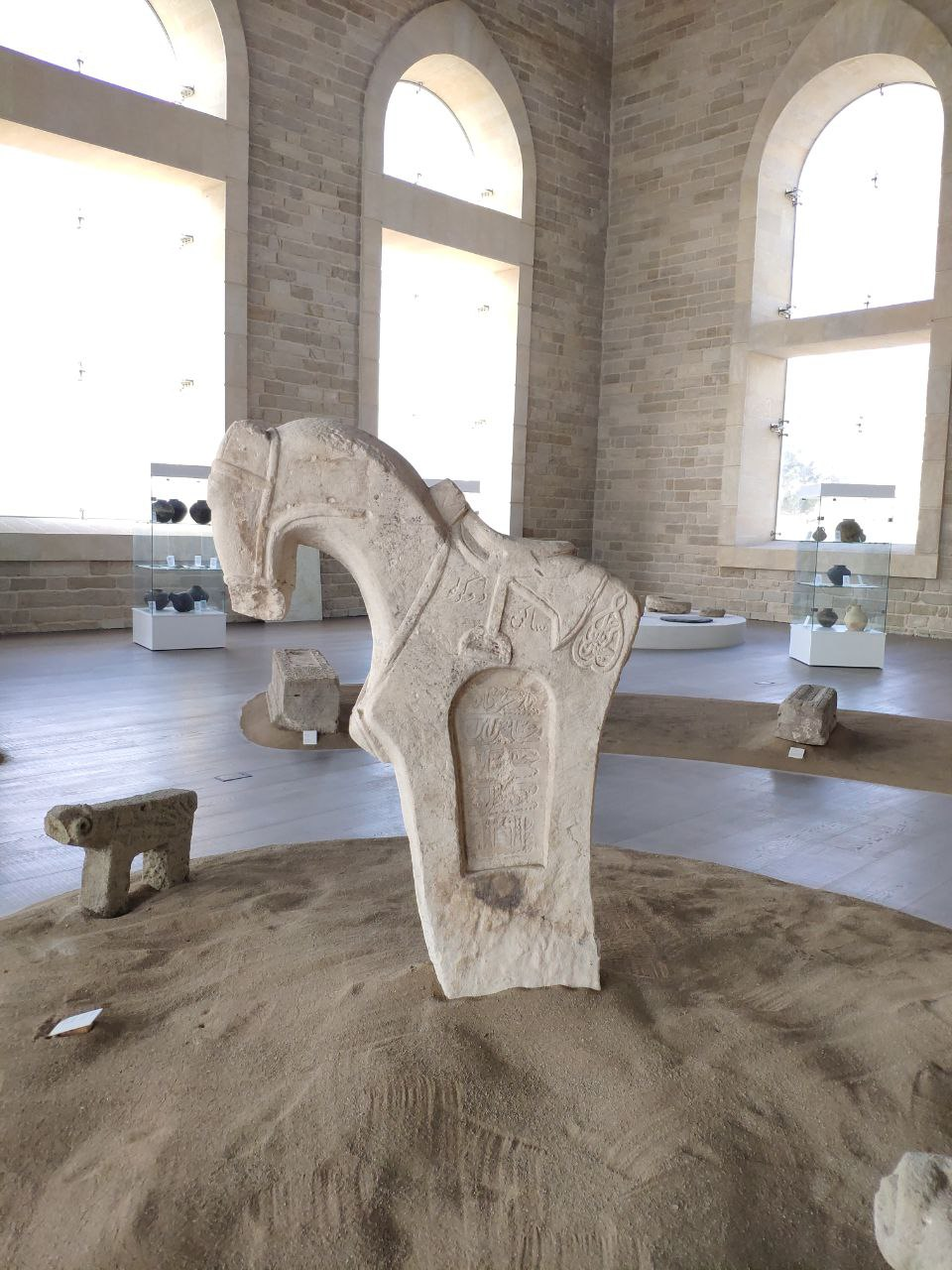
