= Paster (surname) =

Paster is a surname. Notable people with the surname include:

- Gail Kern Paster (born 1944), American Shakespeare scholar, historian and writer
- James Paster (1945–1989), American serial killer
- Stephen Paster (born 1949), American Islamist
- Zorba Paster, American physician and radio host
