= Paste =

Paste is a term for any very thick viscous fluid. It may refer to:

== Science and technology ==
- Adhesive or paste
  - Wallpaper paste
  - Wheatpaste, a liquid adhesive made from vegetable starch and water
- Paste (rheology), a substance that behaves as a solid and a liquid depending on applied load
- Paste gem, a diamond simulant made from rock crystal, glass, or acrylic

=== Computing ===
- Paste (Unix), a Unix command line utility which is used to join files horizontally
- Paste, a presentation program designed by FiftyThree
- Cut, copy, and paste, related commands that offer a UI interaction technique for digital transfer from a source to a destination

== Arts, entertainment and media ==
- Paste (magazine), a monthly music and entertainment digital magazine
- "Paste" (story), a 5,800-word short story by Henry James
- Paste paper, a type of surface-decoration used in bookbinding and other decorative arts

== Food ==
- Paste (food), a semi-liquid colloidal suspension, emulsion, or aggregation used in food preparation
  - Purée, a food paste made with cooked ingredients
  - Spread (food), a ready-to-eat food paste
- Paste (pasty), a small pastry produced in Mexico
- Paste, in the cuisine of Guinea, a savory pastry

== See also ==
- Cut and paste (disambiguation)
- Paaste, a village in Estonia
