= State Flag Square (Baku) =

Large city square in Baku, Azerbaijan

- Dövlət Bayrağı Meydanı
- State Flag Square in 2026

- Location within Baku, Azerbaijan
- Type: Square
- Maintained by: Mayoralty of Baku
- Area: 60 hectares (150 acres)
- Location: Baku, Azerbaijan
- Coordinates: 40.3443°N 49.8449°E

State Flag Square (Azerbaijani: Dövlət Bayrağı Meydanı) is a public square situated along Neftchiler Avenue in Bayil, Baku, Azerbaijan. Spanning 60 hectares (150 acres), with its upper section covering 3 hectares (7.4 acres), the square prominently displays national symbols of Azerbaijan, including the state coat of arms, anthem, and a bronze map of the country. Since 2024, it has held the record for the “largest flag flown”.

== History ==
The square was established by presidential decree on 17 November 2007, coinciding with the designation of 9 November as State Flag Day. Construction began on 30 December 2007 in Bayil, near the Naval Base, with President Ilham Aliyev attending the groundbreaking. In October 2009, an additional presidential order accelerated the project, allocating 10 million manats from the state reserve fund to the Baku City Executive Power.

Designed by the U.S. firm Trident Support and executed by Azerbaijan’s Azenko, the square’s infrastructure integrates visibility from across Baku. Bronze elements, including the coat of arms, anthem text, and national map, were gilded using gold electroplating. A dedicated State Flag Museum was incorporated into the complex.

== First flagpole (2010–2017) ==
From 2010 to 2017, the square featured a 162-meter flagpole, holding a 35 m × 70 m (2,450 m²) flag weighing 350 kg. On 29 May 2010, Guinness World Records certified it as the world’s tallest flagpole.

== Reconstruction and restoration ==
In 2017, the flagpole and the flag museum were also closed for repairs due to the reconstruction and restoration work carried out at the State Flag Square. In 2021, the Turkish company Çimtaş began preparing a new flagpole for Azerbaijan. The installation of the flagpole platform in Baku began in May 2024. The construction of the flagpole was completed in August 2024.

== Second flagpole (2024–present) ==
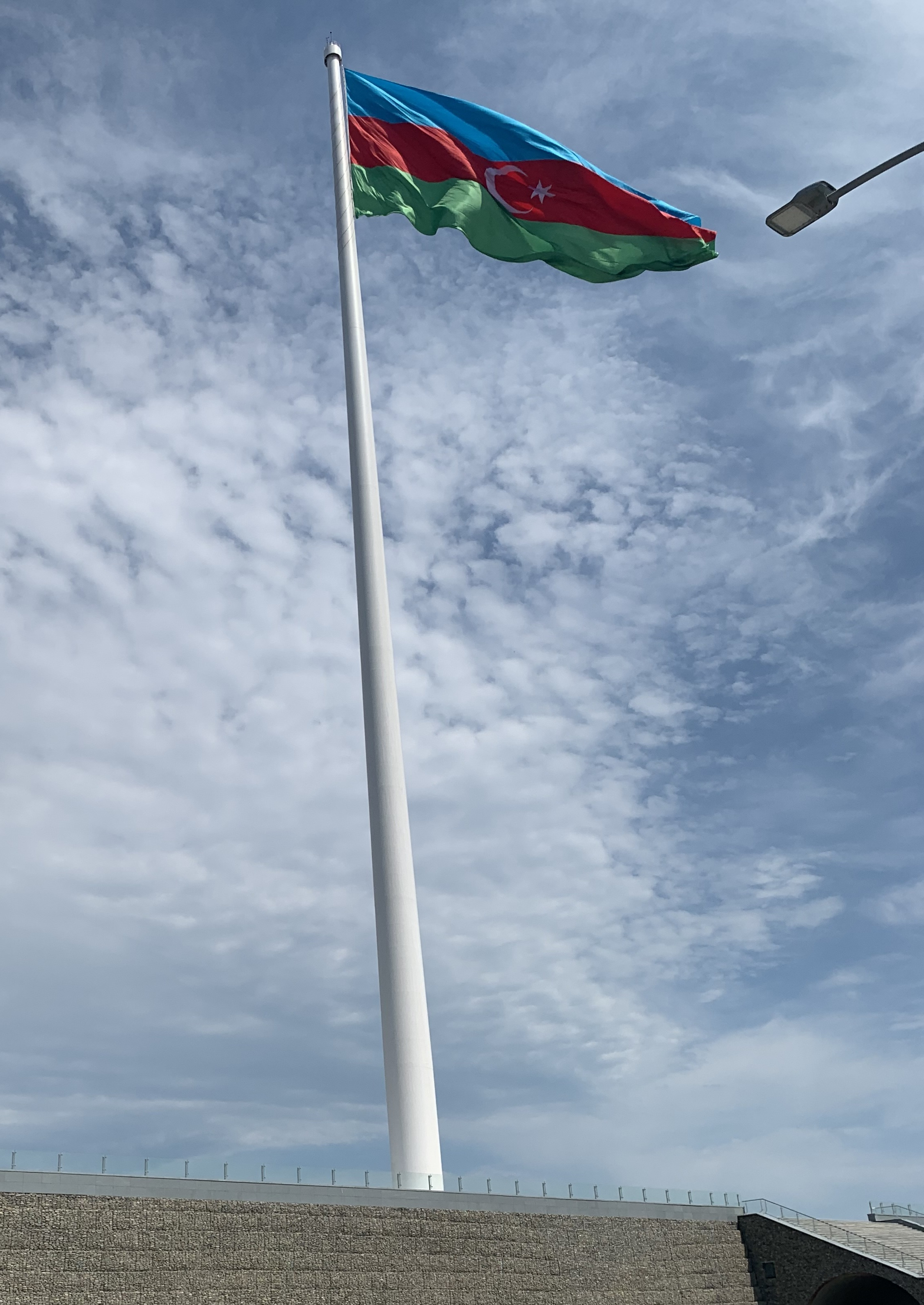
Current flagpole

The total height of the flagpole is 201.191 meters (195.074m from its base), and the structure consists of 10 sections. The diameter of the lower part of the construction is 5.7 meters, while the upper part measures 2.06 meters. The installation of the flagpole was completed in August 2024, after which the flag was raised for the first time for testing purposes. On 28 September 2024, the flag was raised again as part of additional testing.

On 6 November 2024, Guinness World Records officially confirmed that the national flag of Azerbaijan raised at the Square was the “largest flag flown” in the world, measuring 36 × 72 meters.

On November 8, 2024, the Square was opened after reconstruction and restoration works, and President Ilham Aliyev raised the Azerbaijani flag. The square’s reopening coincided with Victory Day on 8 November 2024, commemorating Azerbaijan’s military success in the 2020 Nagorno-Karabakh War

On 18 November 2025, the record for the “largest flag flown” was renewed: a flag measuring 40 × 80 meters, with a total area of 3,235.79 m² (34,829 ft² 108 in²), was entered into the Guinness World Records.

== State Flag Museum ==
The museum was built by the relevant Decree of the President of Azerbaijan and was established on the State Flag Square, where the grand opening ceremony was held on September 1, 2010 in the capital of Azerbaijan, Baku. The museum, created in the shape of an eight-pointed star at the initiative of President Ilham Aliyev, is located under the pedestal of the flagpole on the State Flag Square.

The State Flag Museum displays an exhibition called “Victory Gallery” dedicated to the 44-day Patriotic War. The gallery displays photos of the raising of the State Flag in the territories liberated from occupation by the Supreme Commander-in-Chief and the military parade on the third anniversary of the victory in the Patriotic War in the city of Khankendi.The museum consists of 6 exhibition halls:

- Exhibition Hall A displays flags, flagpoles, symbols of power, coins, weapons, and coats of arms of Azerbaijani cities of the 19th century from ancient and medieval times.
- Exhibition Hall B covers the period of the Azerbaijan Democratic Republic and the Azerbaijan SSR. Here, the State flag hung in the Parliament of the Azerbaijan Democratic Republic on December 7, 1918, photographs of that period, banknotes, postage stamps, as well as flags, coats of arms of the Azerbaijan SSR, constitutions adopted in different years, banknotes and postage stamps are exhibited.
- Exhibition Hall C covers the period of independence. Here, commemorative medals and postage stamps dedicated to the national leader Heydar Aliyev, the standard of the President of the Republic of Azerbaijan, orders and medals of the Republic of Azerbaijan, the Constitution of the Independent Republic of Azerbaijan, as well as orders and medals dedicated to the Patriotic War, and the State flag hoisted on the highest peaks of the world are exhibited. In this hall, a stand is placed containing the Order of the President of the Republic of Azerbaijan dated November 17, 2007 "On the establishment of the State Flag Square in the capital of the Republic of Azerbaijan, Baku", the Order of the President of the Republic of Azerbaijan dated November 17, 2009 "On the establishment of the State Flag Day of the Republic of Azerbaijan", and the Resolution of the Supreme Assembly of the Nakhchivan Autonomous Republic dated November 17, 1990, chaired by Heydar Aliyev.
- In the D Exhibition Hall, flags, medals, emblems and chevrons of the Azerbaijani Armed Forces are exhibited.
- In sectors E and F, ceremonial uniforms of military personnel of the Republic of Azerbaijan are exhibited.
- In addition, videos dedicated to the ancient and medieval periods of Azerbaijan, the period of the Azerbaijan Democratic Republic and the Azerbaijan SSR, the services of the National Leader Heydar Aliyev in the history of Azerbaijani statehood, the army building of the President of the Republic of Azerbaijan Ilham Aliyev and the historical victory in the Patriotic War are shown on the monitors in the Museum.

== Gallery ==
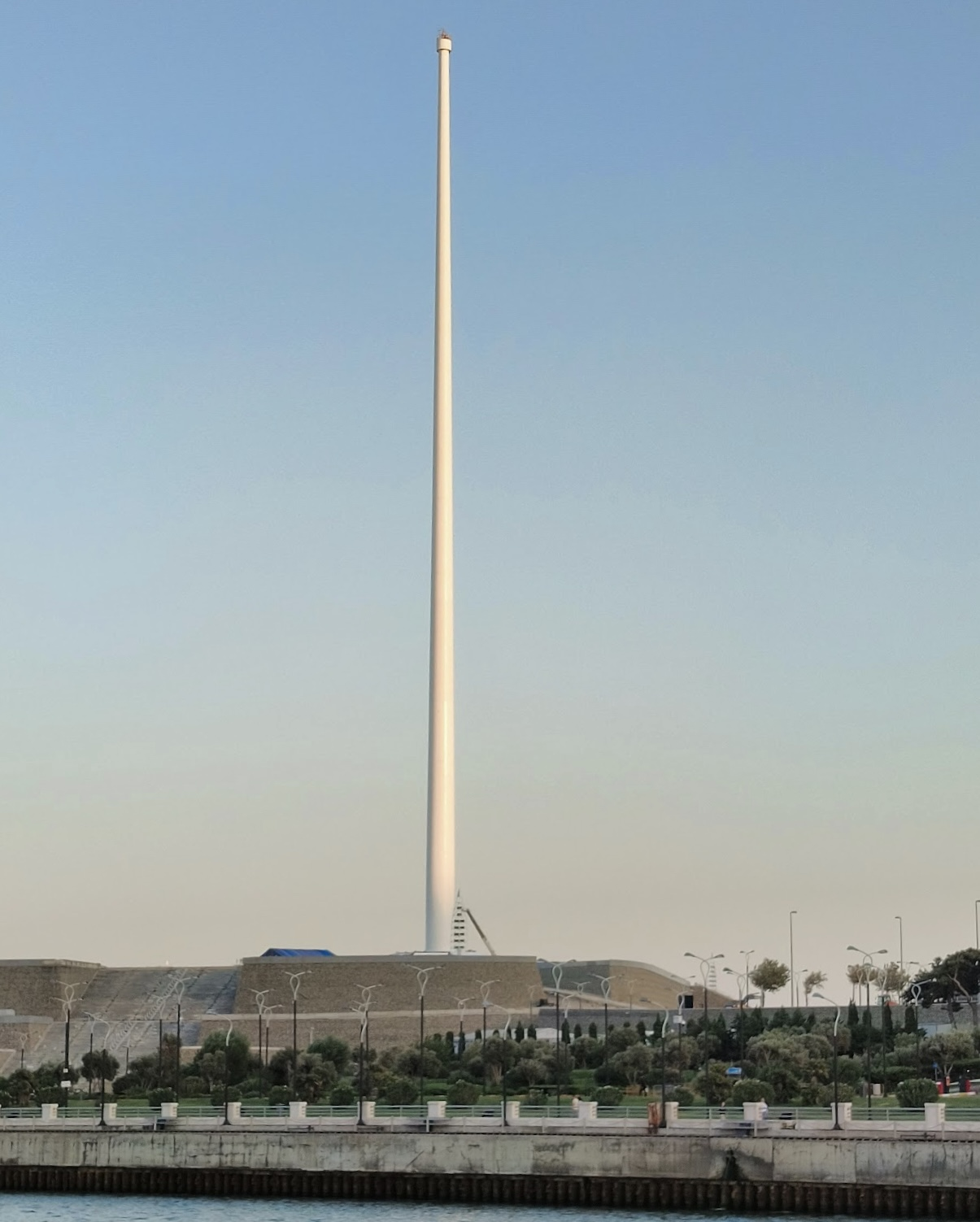
Empty flagpole

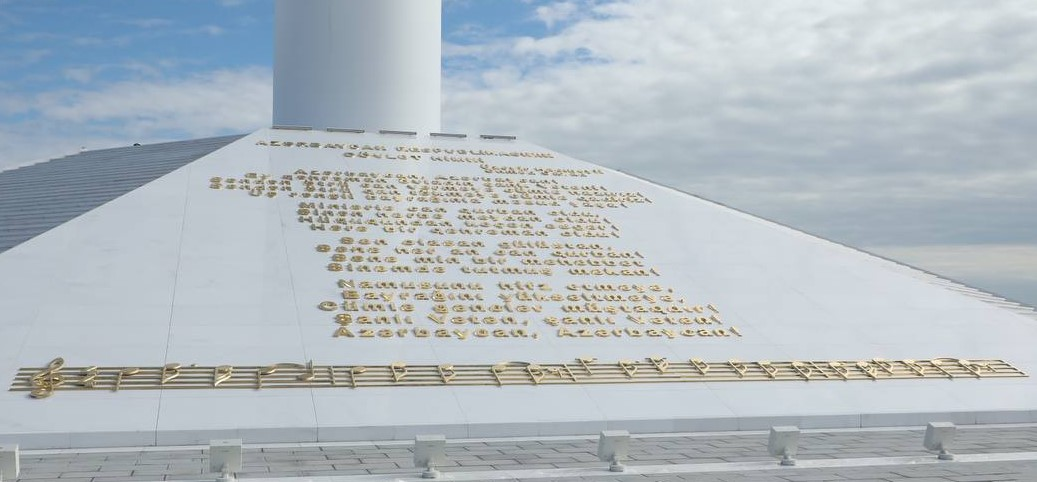
Lyrics of the Azerbaijan March

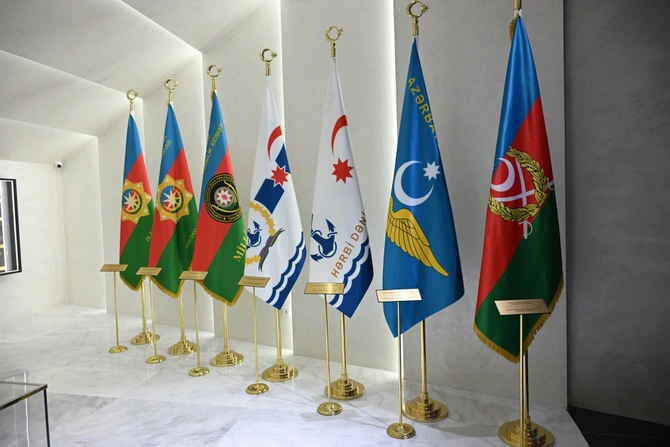
Flag museum

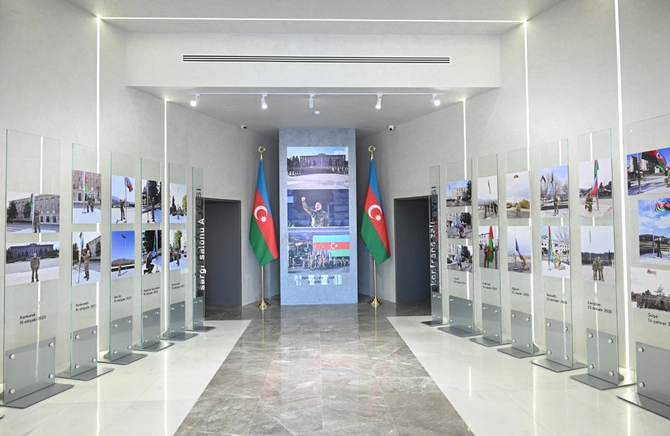
Entry of the flag museum

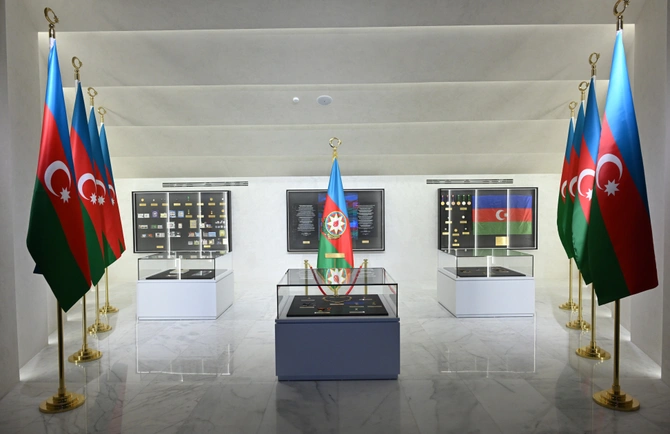
Flag museum

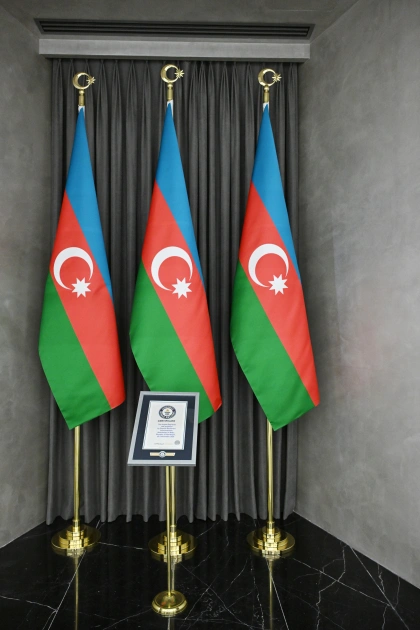
Guinness World Records certificate

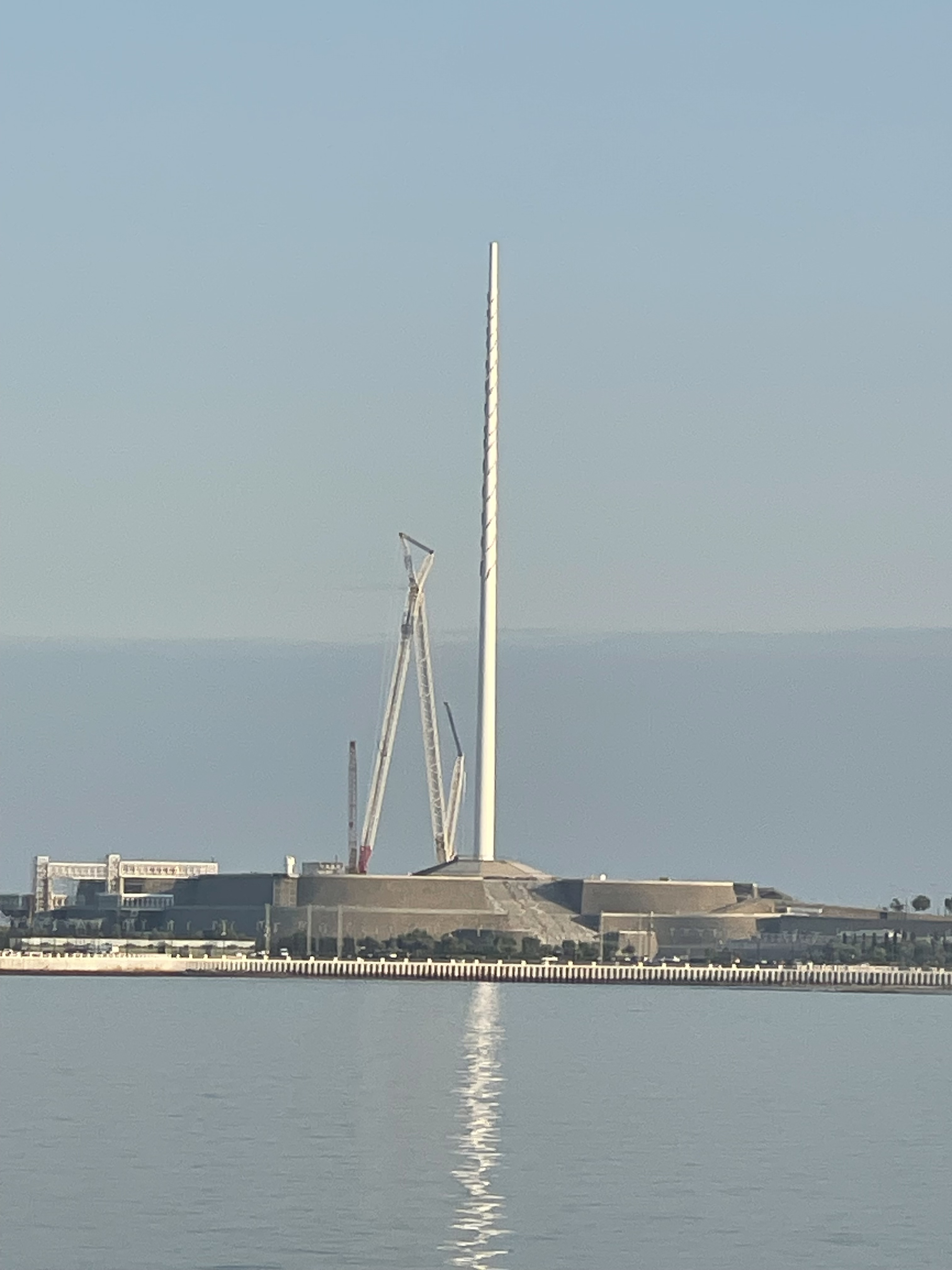
Construction at the site in 2024

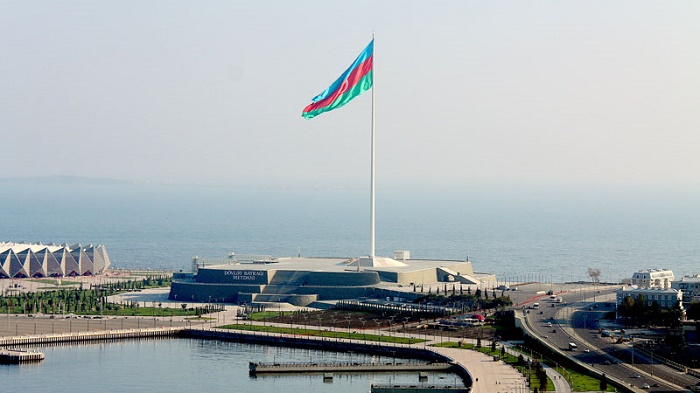
The flagpole from far away

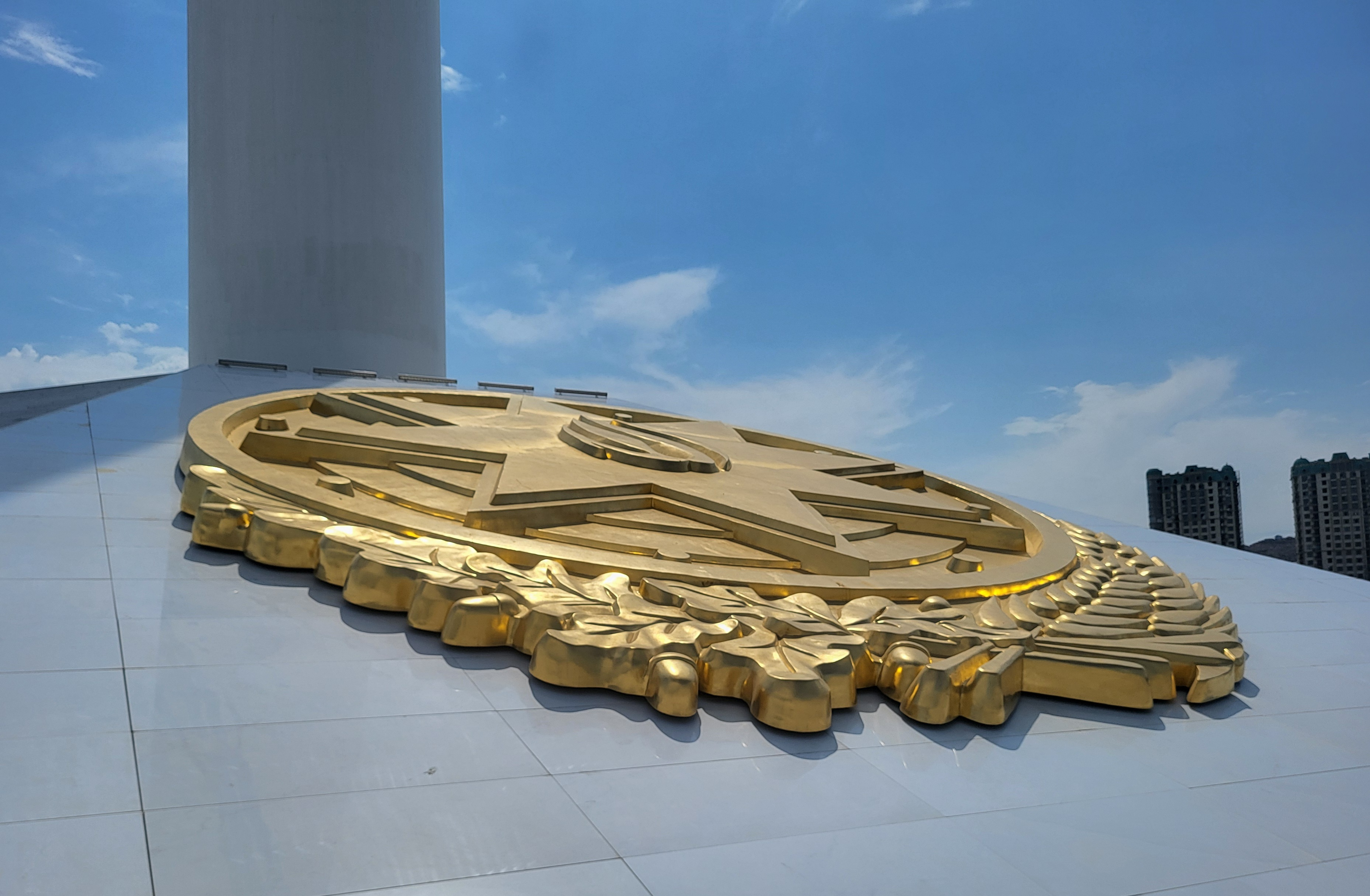
Coat of Arms of Azerbaijan at the square

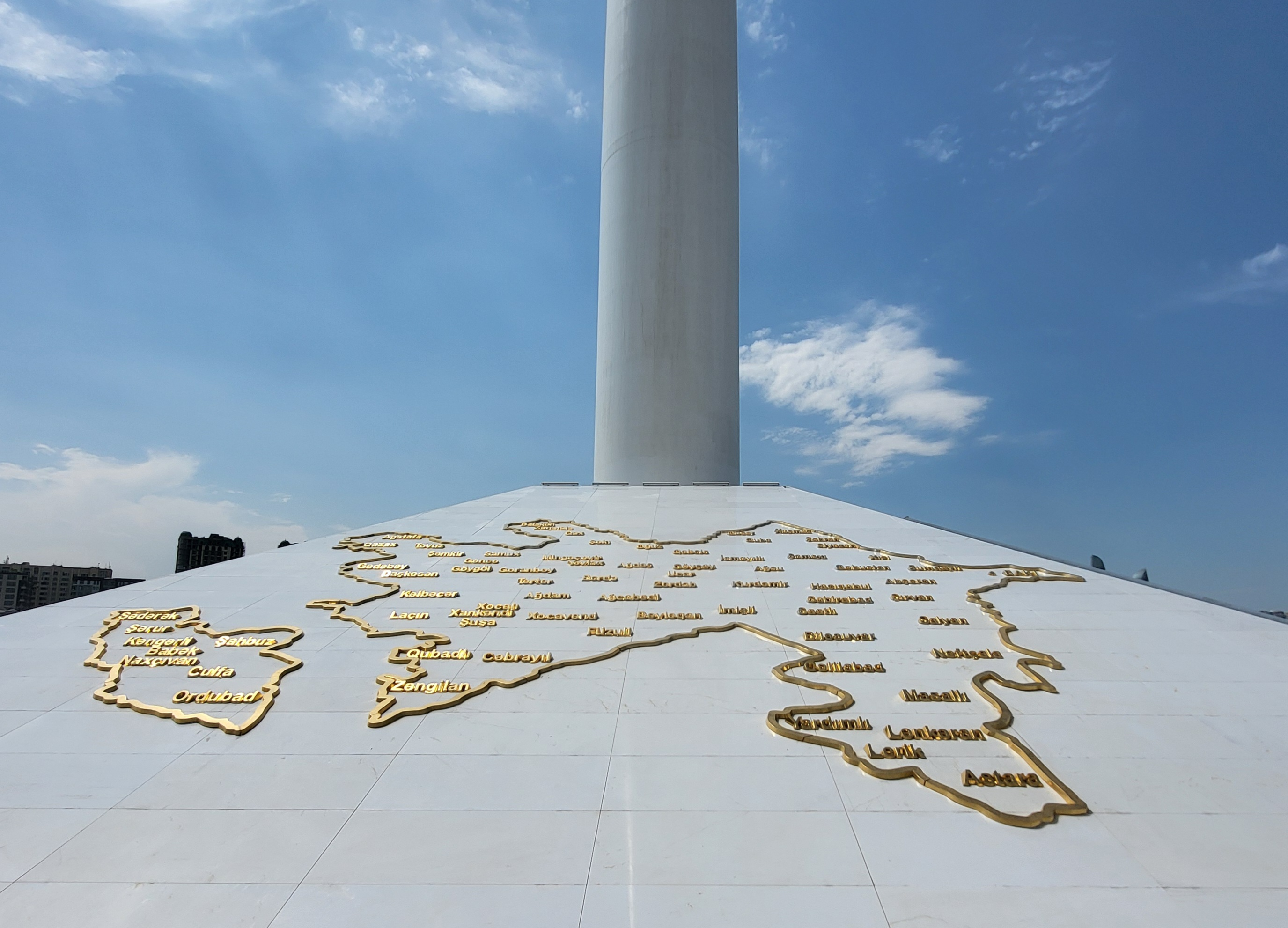
Map of Azerbaijan

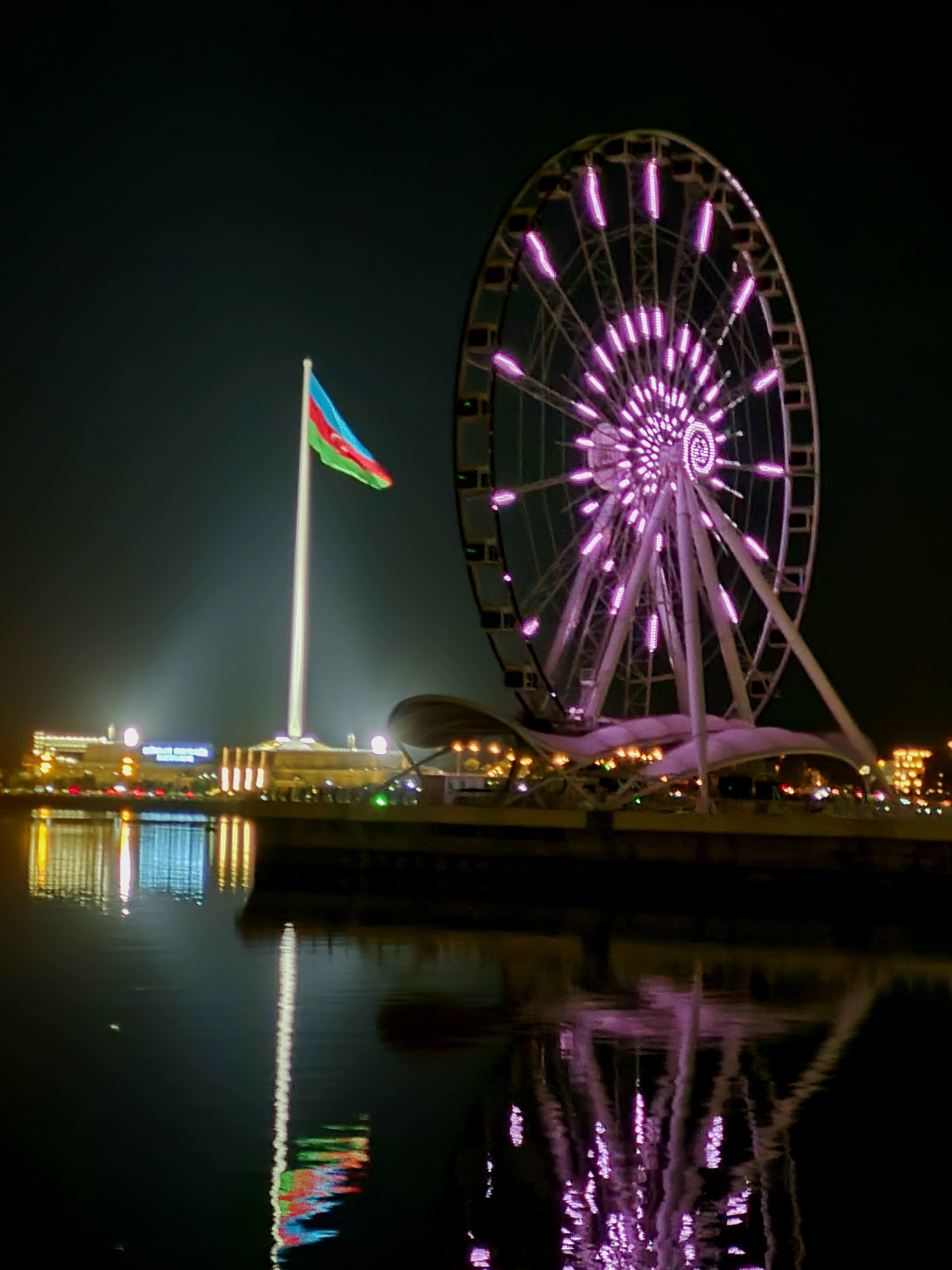
The flagpole at night

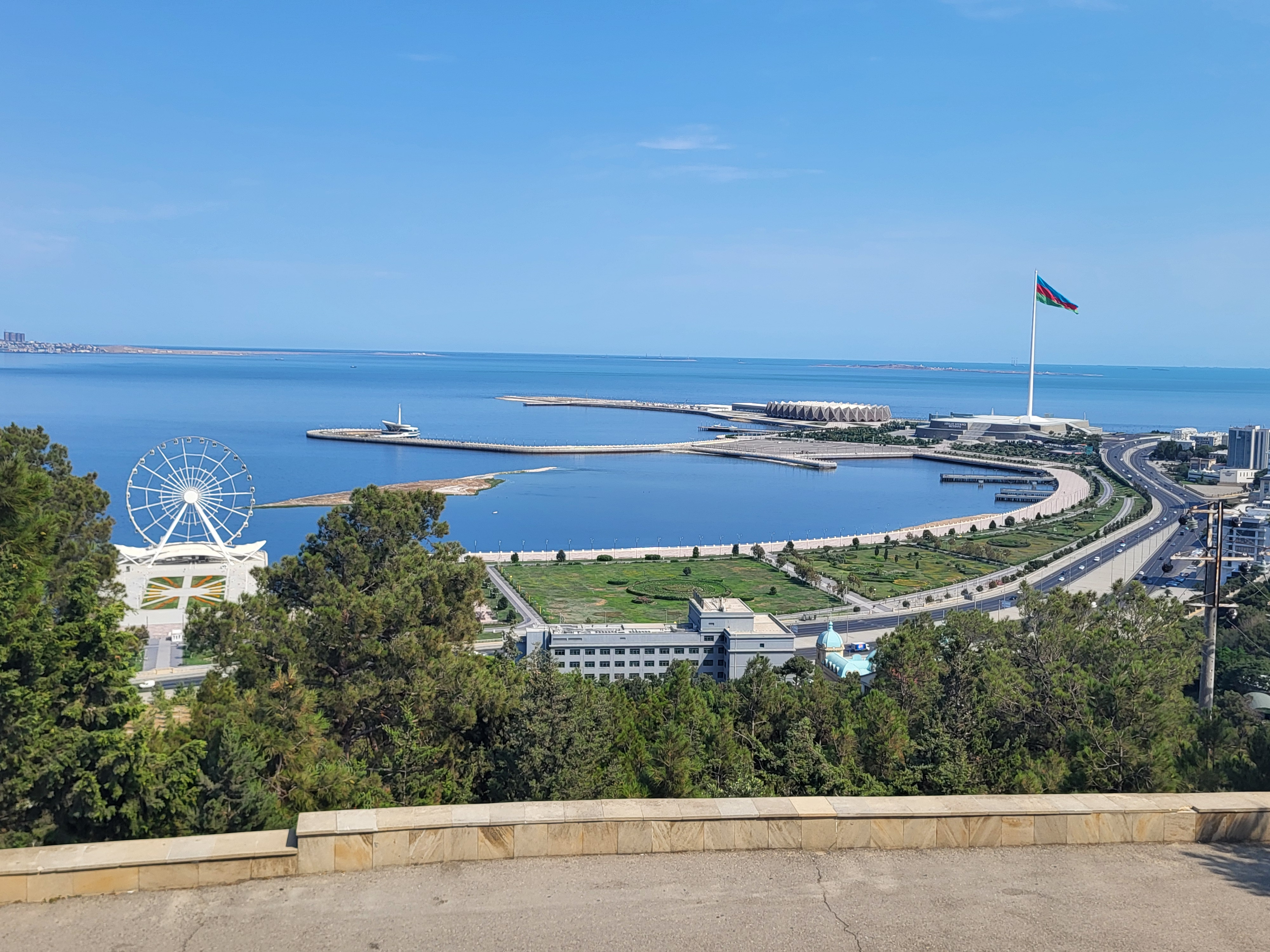
Neftchiler Avenue with the flagpole, from Şəhidlər Xiyabanı

== See also ==
- Baku Boulevard
- Architecture in Baku
- Martyrs' Lane
