= Józef Gosławski =

Józef Gosławski may refer to:

- Józef Gosławski (architect) (1865–1904), Polish Russian architect
- Józef Gosławski (sculptor) (1908–1963), Polish sculptor and medallic artist
