= Building of the Baku City Executive Power =

Administrative building in Baku, Azerbaijan

Building of Baku City Executive Power
- Azerbaijani: Bakı Şəhər İcra Hakimiyyətinin binası Polish: Budynek władz wykonawczych miasta Baku
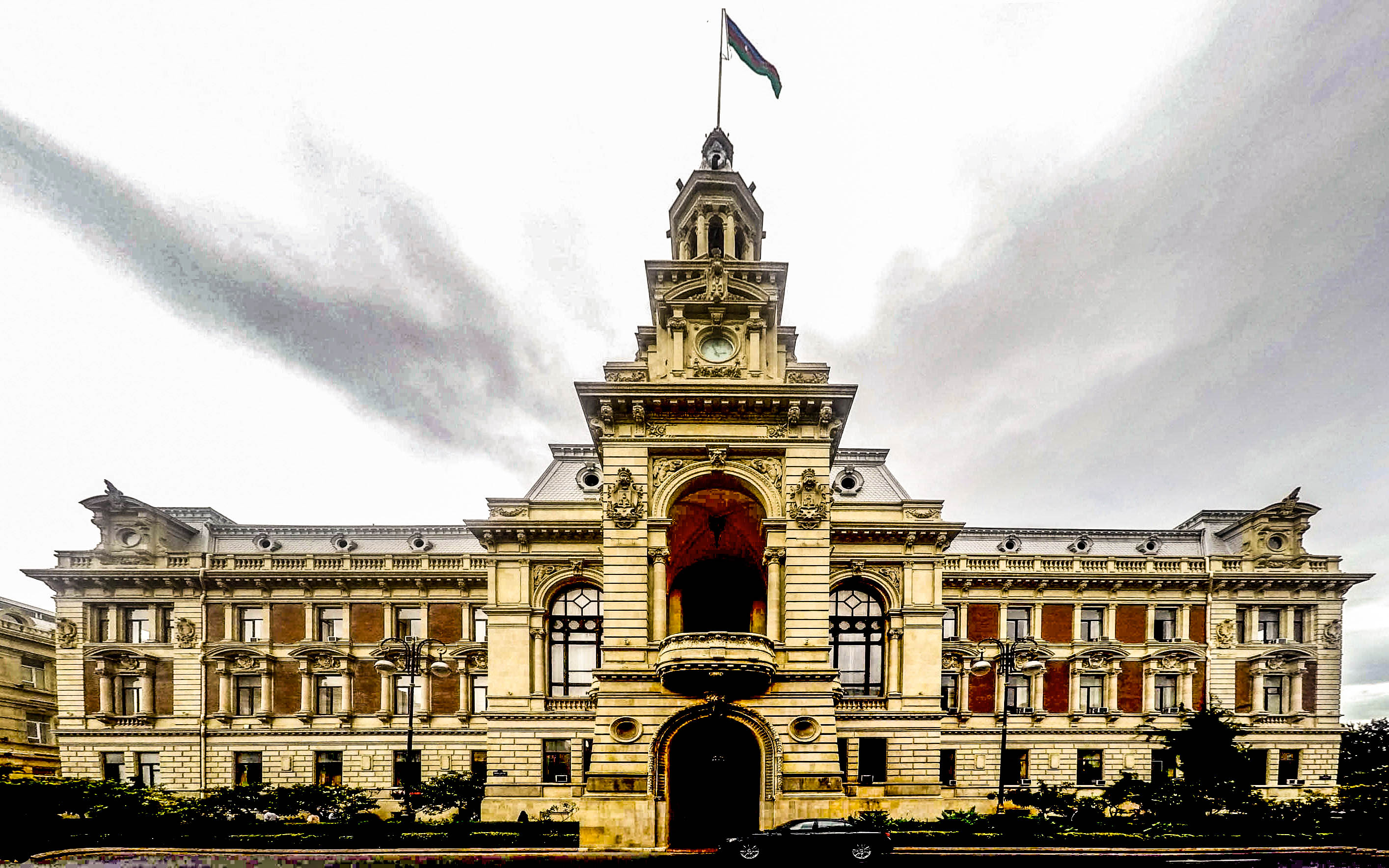
- Main facade of the building

- Location within Azerbaijan
- Alternative names: Building of Baku City Executive Power

General information
- Type: Mansion
- Architectural style: Baroque architecture
- Location: Istiglaliyyat Street, 4, Baku, Azerbaijan
- Coordinates: 40.3785°N 49.8086°E
- Current tenants: Azerbaijani government
- Construction started: 1900
- Completed: 1904
- Cost: 400,000 Russian rubles
- Client: Baku City Duma

Technical details
- Floor count: 2

Design and construction
- Architect: Józef Gosławski

The Building of Baku City Executive Power is an administrative building in Azerbaijan's capital Baku, at Istiglaliyyat Street, 4. The building was built in Baroque style in 1900–1904 on the basis of Polish architect Józef Gosławski's project. The building is the last work of Gosławski. After his death in 1904, the project was initially led by Kazimierz Skórewicz, later by the Polish architect Józef Płoszko.

The building was constructed on the order of Baku Duma and is currently being used by executive authority of Baku. The building is registered as a national architectural monument by the decision of the Cabinet of Ministers of Azerbaijan dated 2 August 2001, No. 132.

== Preparation ==
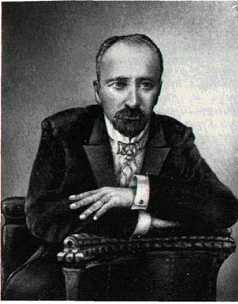
Author of project of the building Józef Gosławski

In 1898, Kazimierz Skórewicz prepared detailed sketch project with assignment of State Duma, Construction Commission, which included Gosławski, Józef Płoszko, Skórewicz and Adolf Eichler. On 18 July 1898, after the Commission evaluated Skurvick's sketch project, it was decided to assign Gosławski the plan, façade works. It's unknown to determine if Gosławski used Skórewicz's ideas, since there is no sketch of Skórewicz in the archives.

Architects who led construction work after the death of Gosławski

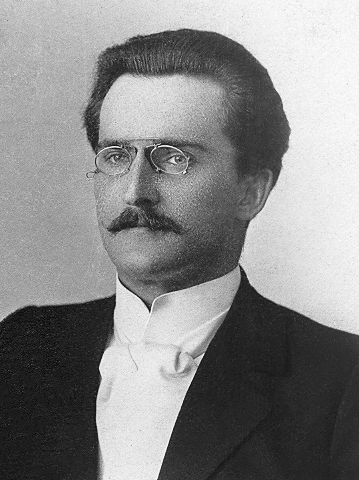
Józef Płoszko

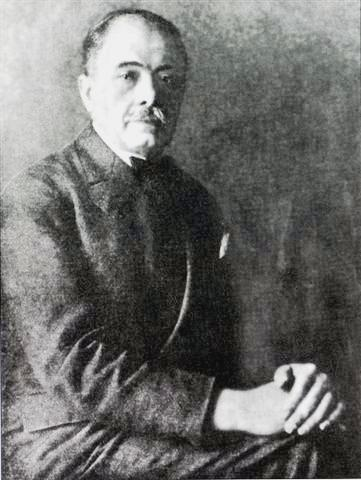
Kazimierz Skórewicz

== Construction ==
Although the building was designed with side wings, the construction began with the main building, and the cost of such large construction was too heavy for the city treasury. On 18 May 1900, a solemn ceremony was held for groundbreaking of city duma and first administrative building of the city's personal services. The Construction Commission carefully monitored the construction progress and the quality process. Particular attention was paid to the quality of the stone chosen for facade walls, as it could have an effect not only on firmness, but also on the general impression.

On the eve of the construction of the first floor in the course of construction works, the governor of Baku requires the mayor to send the project to confirm it. He referred to the necessity of the governor's approval of the construction of public and private buildings for the community halls. According to some statements, Gosławski prepared a special project part of the building intended for the hall, "specially designed for the Duma sessions and designed as an amphitheater in the style of a parliamentary hall". The cost of this additional building was 51,000 rubles, and the cost of the whole building reached 441,174 rubles. Later this idea lost its importance. After the main construction of the building and the cleaning of the construction dump, the chief city gardener offered to plant "a garden to serve the beauty of architecture" in front of the building. He drafted the garden and in 1904 this project was implemented.

After the death of Gosławski on 15 January 1904, Skórewicz, who was appointed to manage the construction of the building, made a great effort to keep the architectural idea completely and do not load interiors by Uprava and Duma. The weakening of the construction commission, which had completed the work of the building, led to the stoppage of work to be done, and Skórewicz, who could not work without the commission's decision, demanded the commission to take over the completed work because the successful completion of the construction of the city house was dependent on it.

Under the direction of Józef Płoszko, one of the flanks on the premises for the Upravan water pipeline department was built, based on the Gosławski's project. The construction started in the summer of 1911 was completed on 27 September 1912 and the building was handed over.

=== Use of bricks and plowing problems ===
Ledge on the building's front facade (left)
and dragon trim (right)
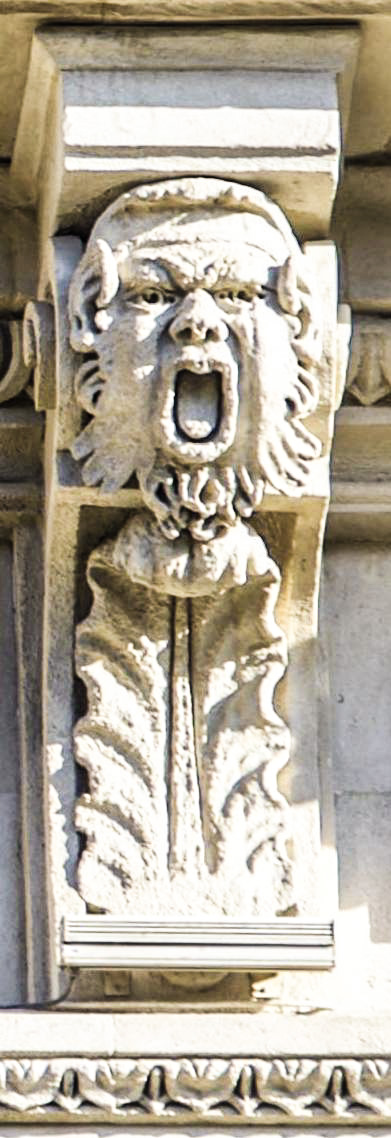
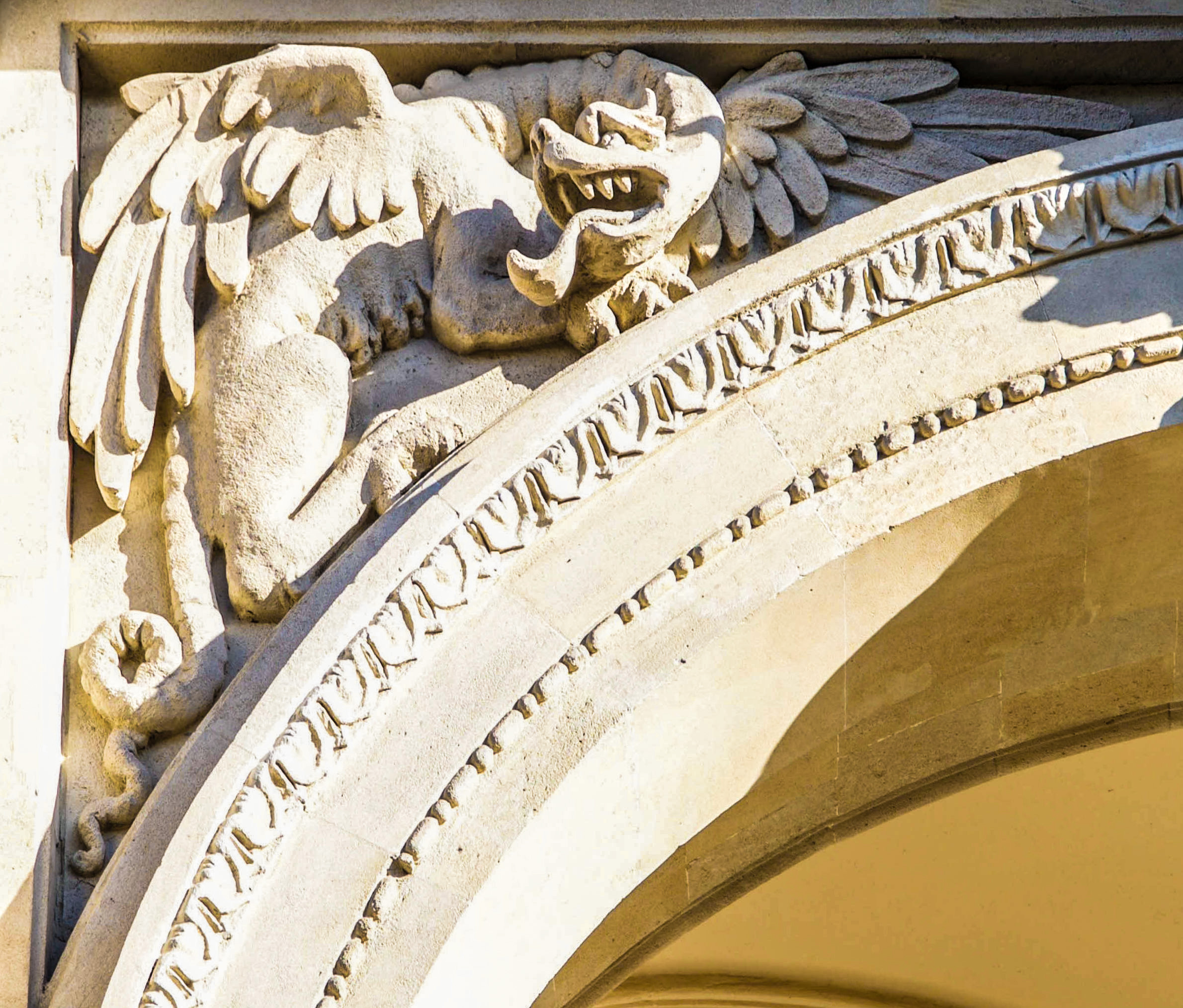

The stones used for the facades of the building was shaved and prepared by the Atayev brothers (masters Salman, Aslan, Iskender, Abuzar, Eyyub) in Baku. Bricks were used on the facade of two upper floors as the artistic element of the Gosławski composition. At that time, new modern-style facing materials were beginning to be included in the structure of buildings. Since this was a very expensive material, it is not widely distributed in Baku buildings. However, in the architectural facade of the City Duma building, this color element has been an effective part of the building's history and modernity. For the second and third floors of the Gosławski's project, he included a red brick as a facing material in the overall estimate. The construction was successful and as Gosławski's report to construction commission, it was necessary to order a bricks to keep the construction going. While reviewing the history of the City Duma's construction process, it becomes evident that Gosławski was the chief architect of the city and the author of the building project, but did not have the right to act freely, and sanction of the construction commission was necessary in the solution of each issue.

When fasading with red bricks it became clear that white flakes could not be cleaned on the bricks. At that time, Gosławski, who did not know how to deal with this difficult situation and how to solve the problem, appealed to the journal of "Civil Engineers Society news", published in St. Petersburg. In his question, Gosławski explains that the sulfuric acid solution used to remove the shingles had a negative effect on the limestone used to cover all facades, saying that "it cannot be used, and I do not know any other method." At the same time, he was advised to familiarize himself with some articles in "Brushing and Cleaning the Brick" magazine. There is no information about the architect's use of these tips or the solution of this serious problem.

=== Tower ===
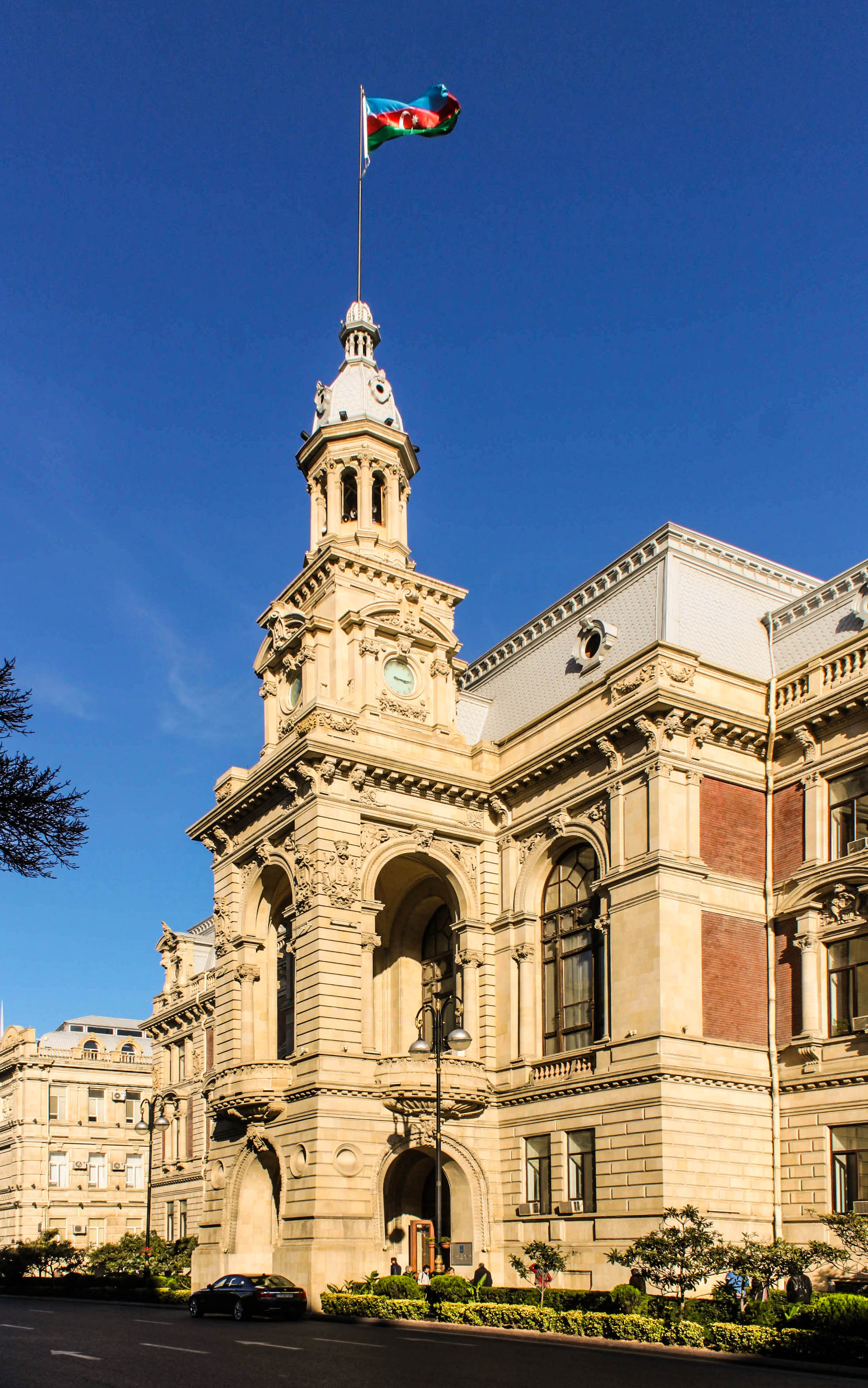
Tower on the sidewalk

Difficulties appeared between the governor of Baku and the City Duma, who reported on 3 May 1901, to the commander of the civilian section in the Caucasus while building a tower directly on the front of the building. Because, any change in the plan required higher authorities permission. Based on the Gosławski project, the tower on the sidewalk reduced width of the sidewalk because it stood on the arches.

After the approval of the tower, the price of the building reached 400,000 rubles.

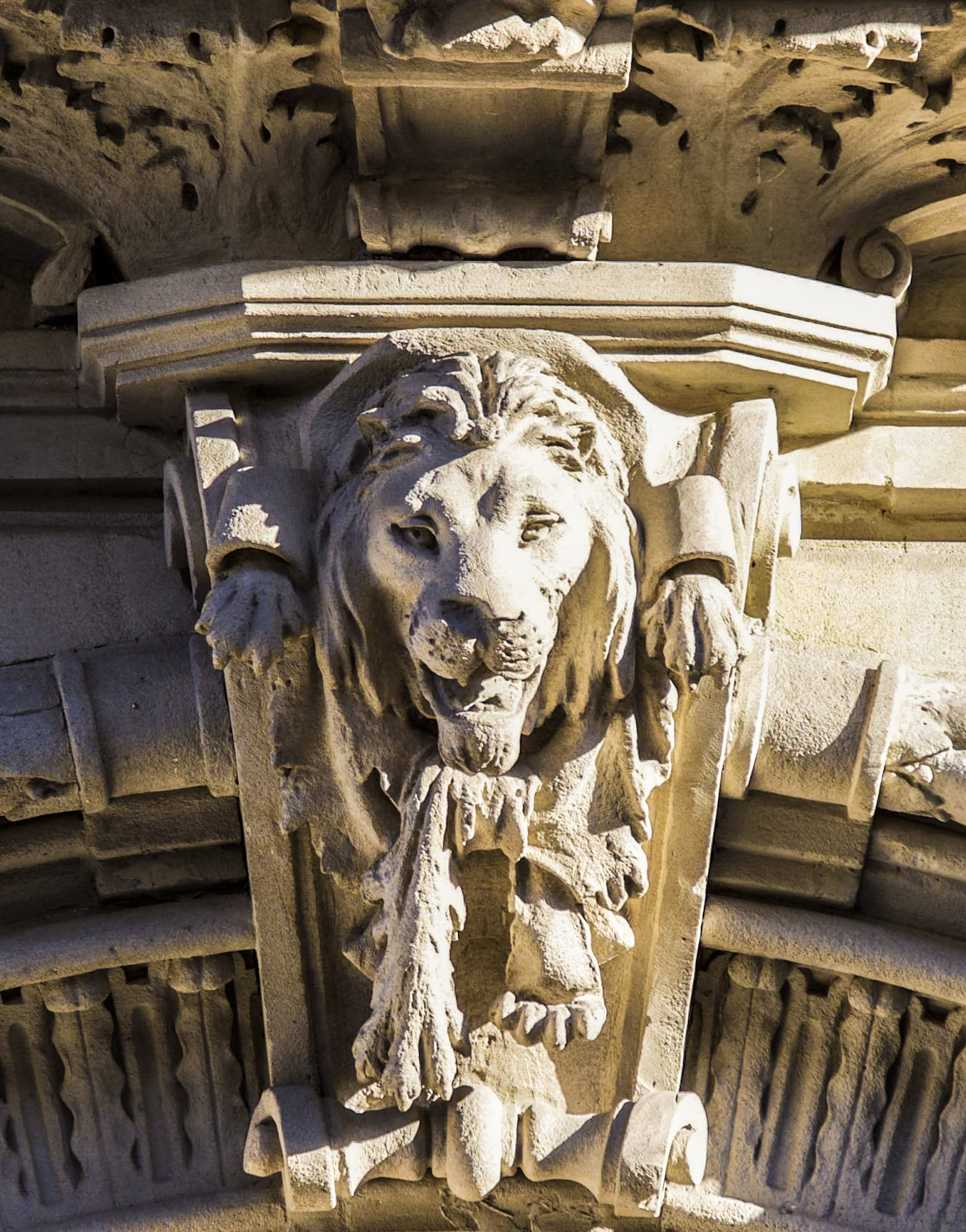
A chained lion ornament under the central porch of the tower

=== Development of roof cover ===
At the beginning of 1902, the building was almost ready, with carpentry and roof covering started to be completed by January 1903. In 1903, a large and expressive silhouette of the tower of the city house was selected, with a tall roof effectively worked on Nikolaevski Street. The former mayor of Baku, A. Novikov, explains why he was taking such a decision on the roof cover:

"After my arrival in the city, I attended a construction commission meeting. The conversation was on the roof. Iron had to fit the estimate. I do not remember – painted or galvanized; the architect in the commission suggested that all the roof be galvanized. The difference was in the price. According to his words, it was only a few thousand rubles difference. I was opposed to wasting money and good iron, and if it were well painted, I would have been for centuries. What a pity! I was alone. It was decided to have a galvanized roof."

In spite of the strong protest of the mayor, the construction commission did not pay attention to his idea, but allowed the architect to choose the closest choice to the overall architectural appearance of the city architecture. By the end of 1902, the construction of the house was completed without interior, and Gosławski wanted a vacation with the due to his illness. The Duma fulfilled his request, taking into account the services of the city's architect, and appointed Skórewicz as a follower of his work.

== Architectural features ==
Gosławski who respected the classic scheme of the composition, symmetrically solved the facade of the building, and expressed a vertical tower against the horizontal divisions of the main volume of the building of Duma. While preparing his own projects, he was in the position of architectural unexpectedness for urban buildings.

The building of the Duma became an important factor in construction of large and monumental buildings of different historical styles on the central street, distinguished by the high quality of architecture.

=== Exterior ===
The three-storeyed building of the Duma dominates the historical center of the city with the use of the Baroque motifs in the original interpretation, with the classic methods of composition. Putting tower at the center of the main façade, it combines it with organic volumes, and the whole composition was given artifacts that lacked at that time the central city highway – Nikolayevski Street. The brightly decorated facades both in general and in separate details, the proportion of divisions, the sculpture of stone details have led to the formation of the expressive facade of the Duma building. Gosławski has successfully solved the color duplication of the two upper floors with the facade element of the composition. Facing brick forms interesting color gamma between the limestone window frames, without disturbing unity of the architecture.

The center of the fasad is decorated with the emblem of the city of Baku. In the middle of the emblem protected till today, three golden torches depicting Azerbaijan as a land of fire are depicted on the blue waves.

Central ledge
Windows ledges

=== Interior ===
The architecture of the interior is built with seriousness and severity. Gosławski used rhythm of Corinthian order pilaster. He incorporates semicircular arches in the interiors of the building as a leading compositing element in the central staircase.

Although the Duma was allocating funds for technical specifications in the construction process, the development of the interior of the house was slow. The death of the author of the building, Gosławski, also affected the reduction of temp in completion. In order to accelerate the process, it was decided to change the architect for construction in the interior development process. In this chair, Skórewicz was replaced by Józef Płoszko, who later became known as the architect of the Ismailiyya Palace. Both of these architects had a great tact for not to go beyond the plan of Gosławski. Nevertheless, each of these architects had their own creative lineage, as they knew the construction process as they were, and that affected the building's interior space and its completion.

=== Meeting room ===
For the first time, Gosławski used the classical order system in the interior design of the meeting room of Duma at full capacity. It divides the walls of the walls into arrows in three sections. The second half of the interior of the hall appears as a continuation of the first one in other interpretations, perimeters, quiet horizontal and vertical divisions, and new architectural methods. The hall's plafon completes the overall architecture of the meeting room's interior. Exquisite work to be used in the interior of the building required great skill. For this purpose the competition was announced, the works of three companies were presented, among which the French company, which was built by Franz's master Pojiltsov, has been declared as "satisfying the requirements with the smoothness and elegance of the painting". "Florencia" company was entrusted with painting work. This company has made painting works consisting of adhesive paint and wall panels of the ceiling in the rooms of Duma.

=== Acoustics ===
Despite the positive architectural quality of the meeting hall, it was discovered that the acoustics were weak during the operation. Since Gosławski was ill, he could not solve the acoustics of the hall that were important to such places. When the issue of improving the acoustics of the meeting hall emerged, it was decided to engage civil engineer Nikolai Bayev, who built a magnificent acoustics at Azerbaijan State Academic Opera and Ballet Theater by order of Mayilov brothers in 1911.

When Bayev understood that it's not an escape from the situation, he offered to cover all the walls of the hall with a mushroom, and paint it, which was made in the concert hall of the Saint Petersburg Conservatory, according to the new version he found to improve the acoustics of the hall. Soon they draw out linen covers, flooring carpets and heavy curtains of windows, but due to lack of funding Bayev's project could not be implemented.

== Gallery ==
Different views of the building

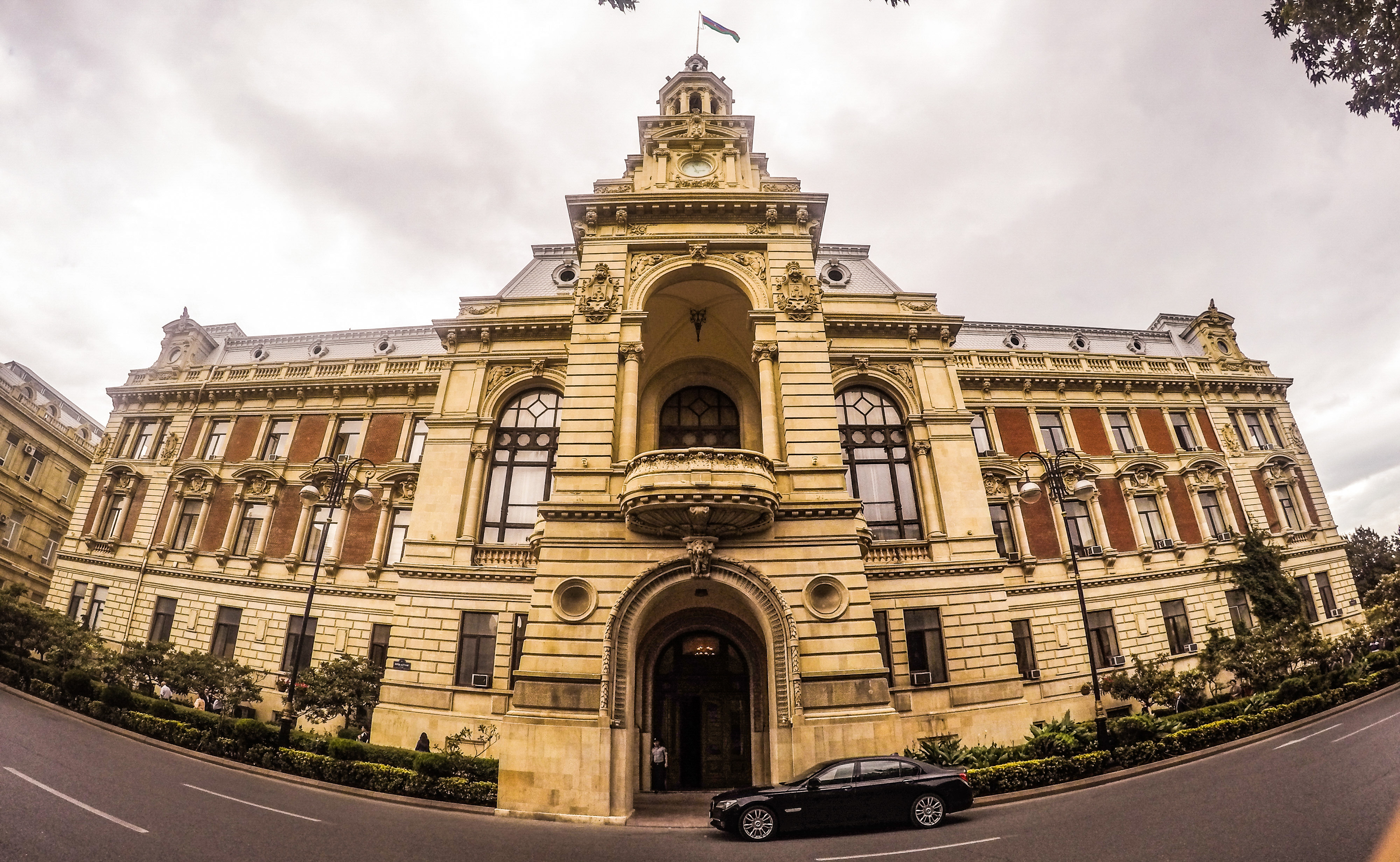

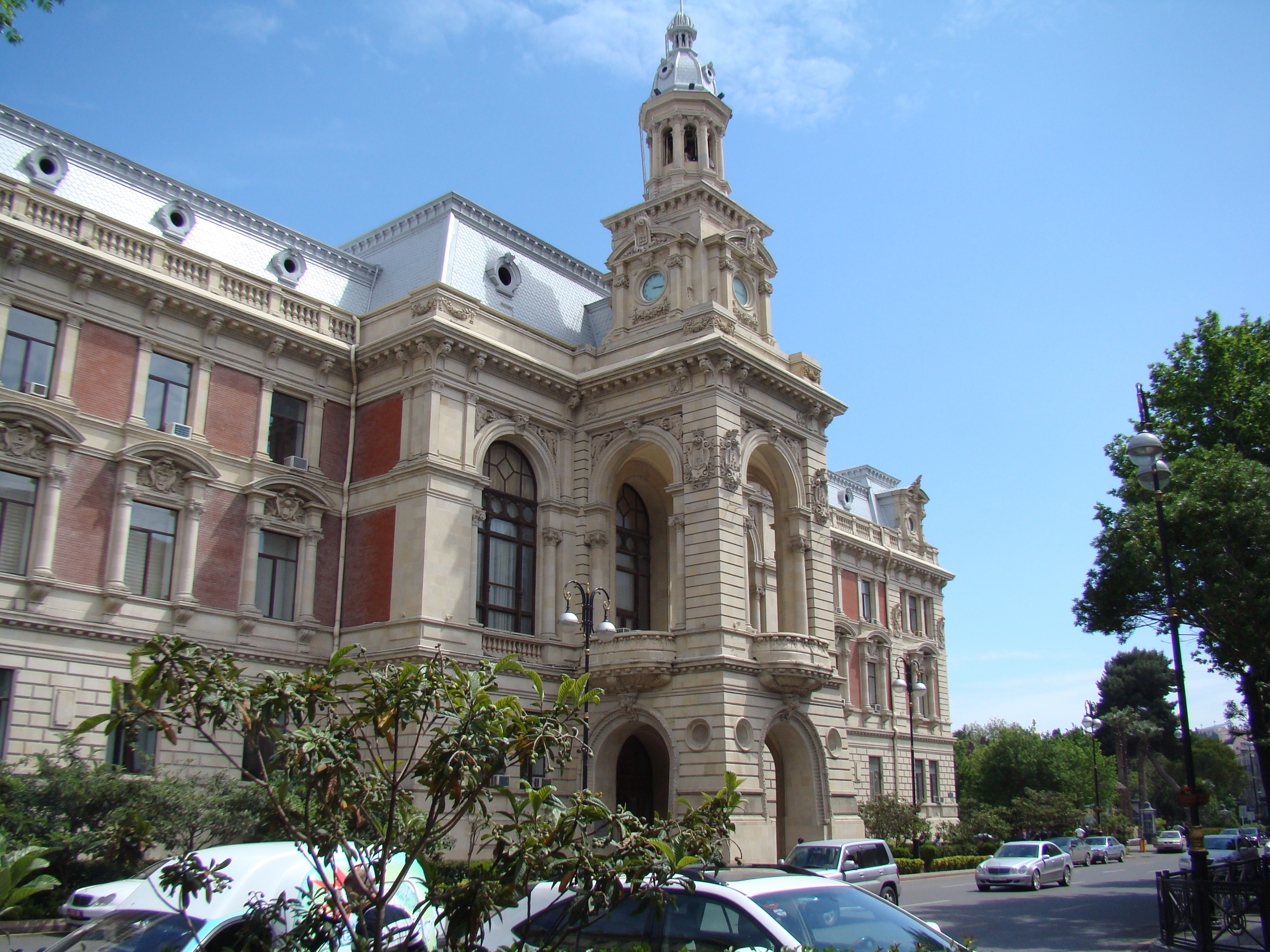

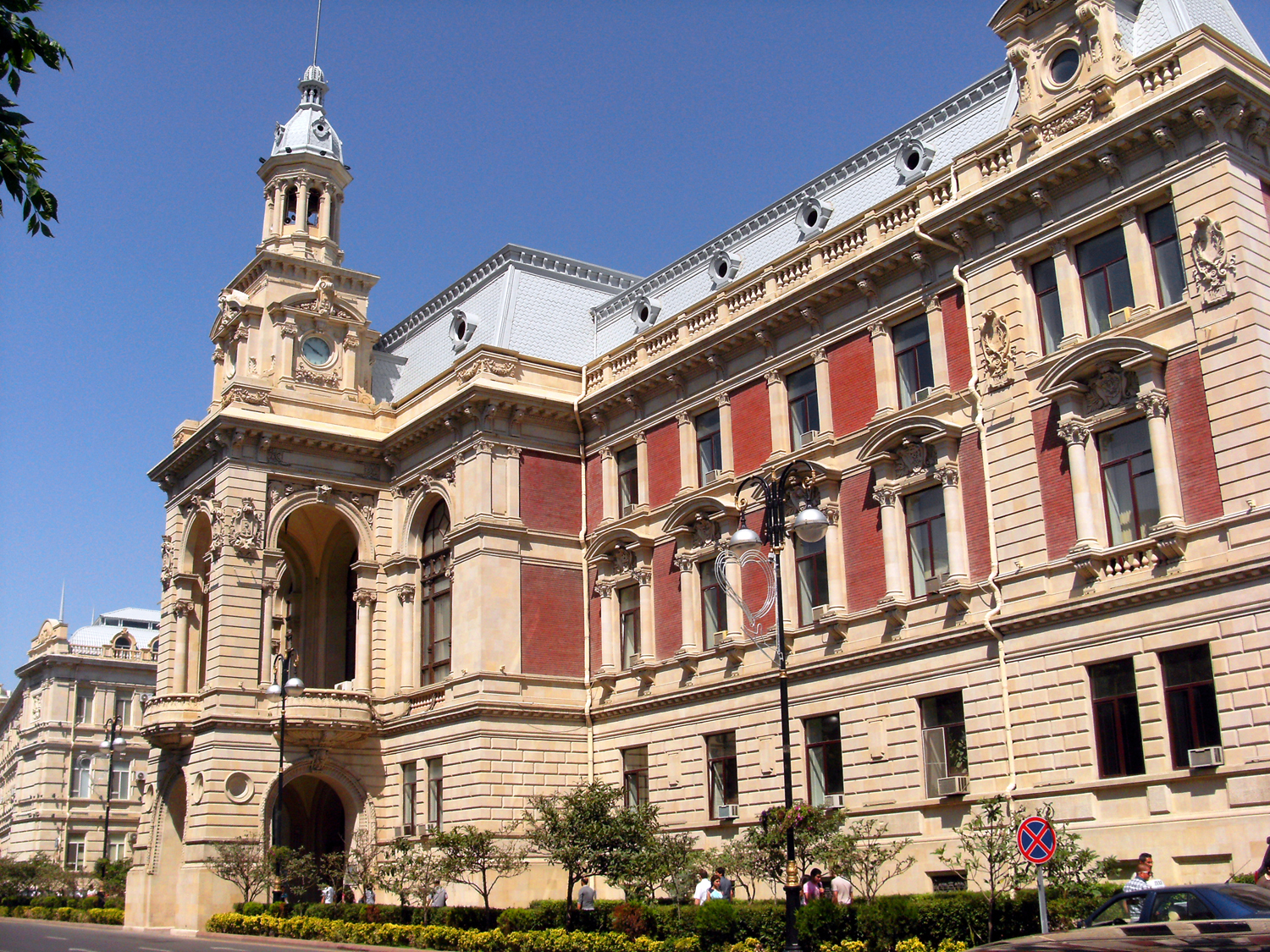

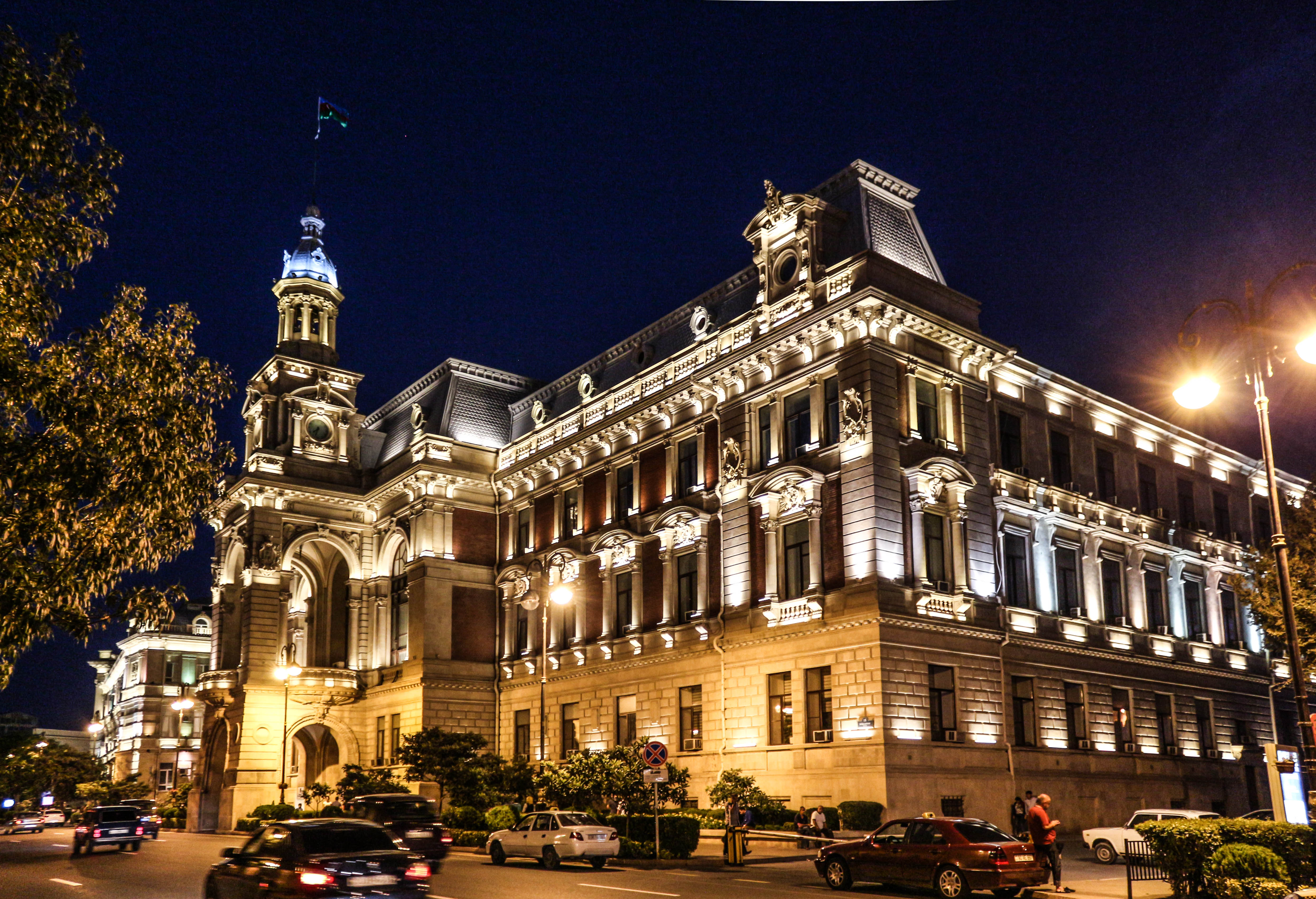

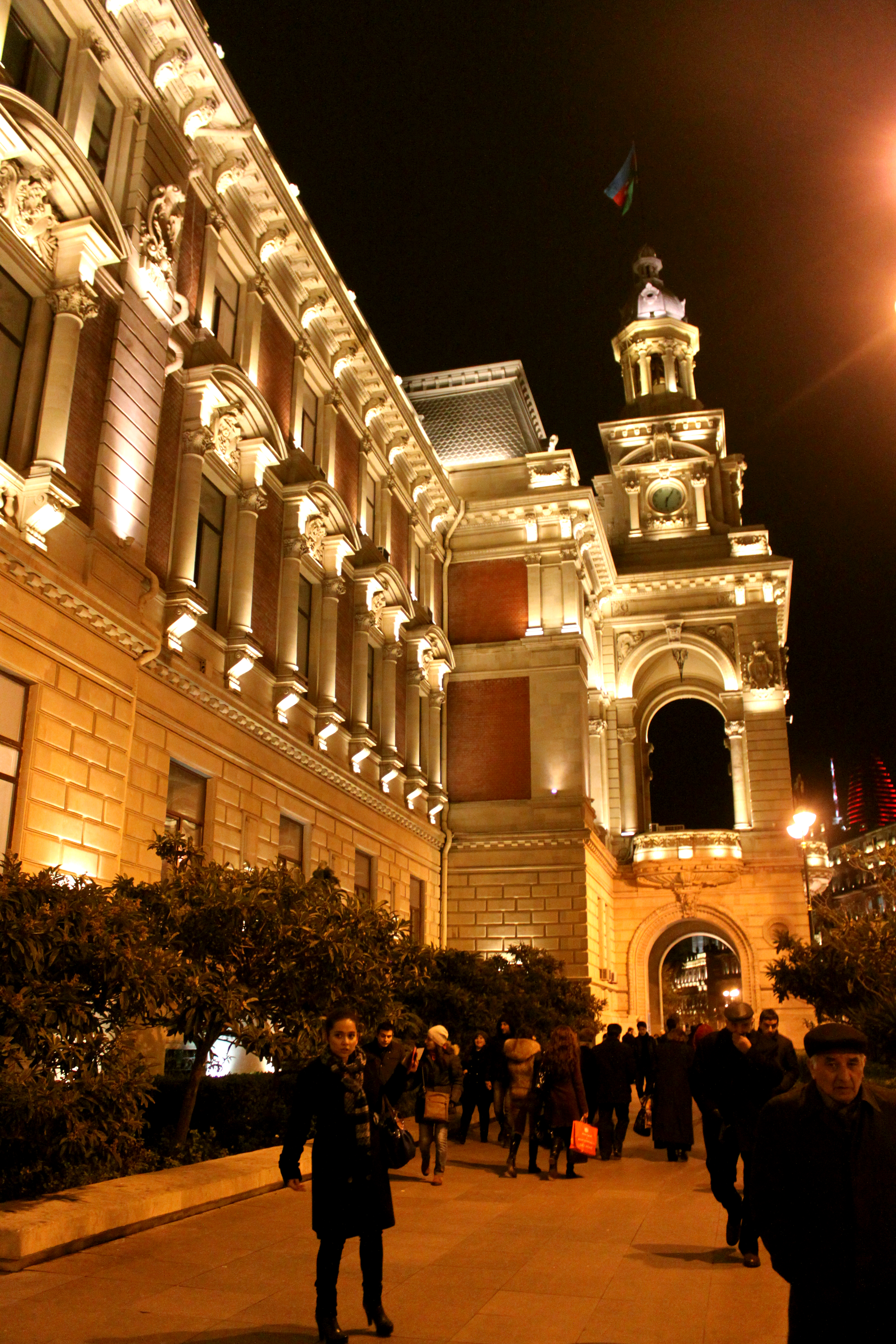

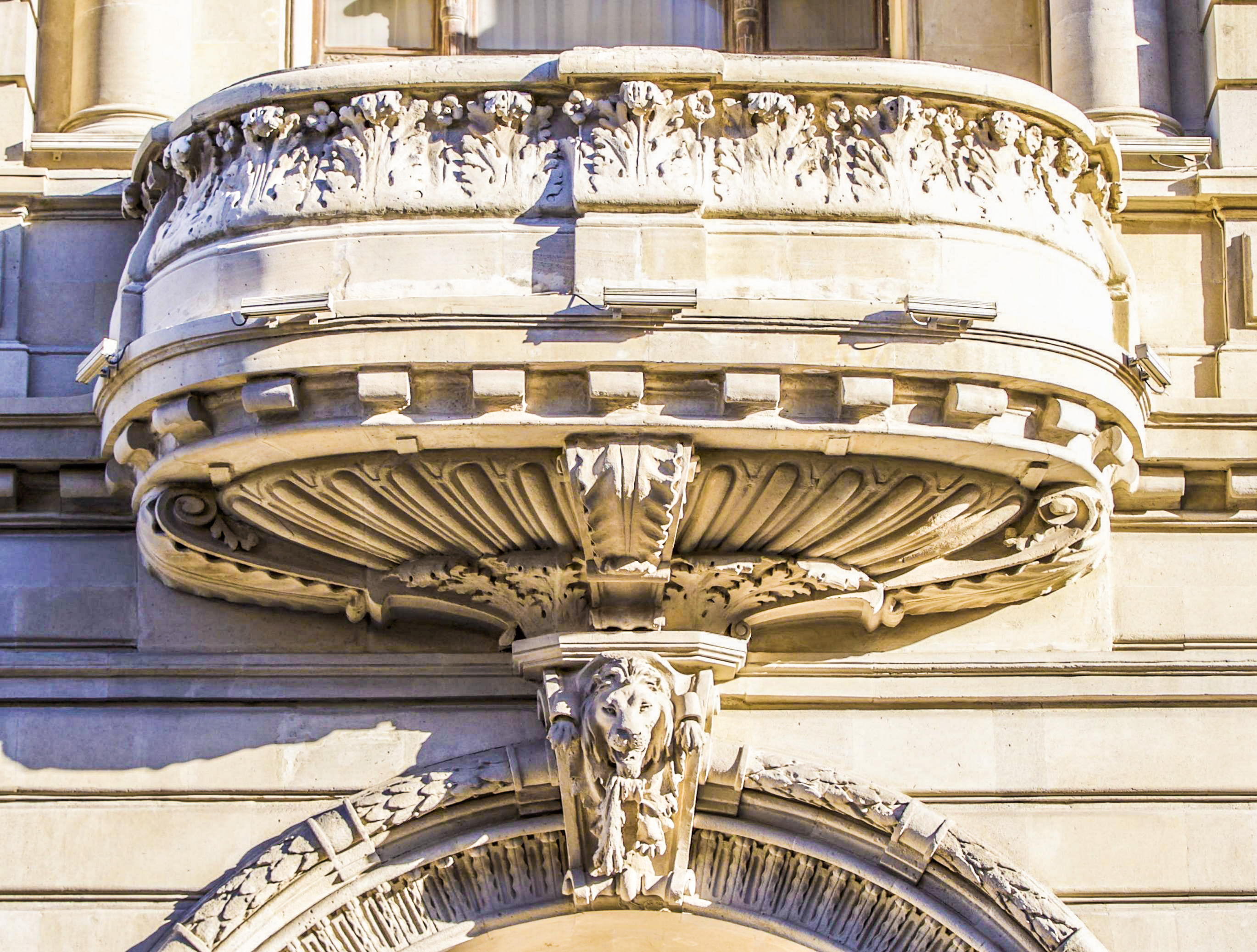

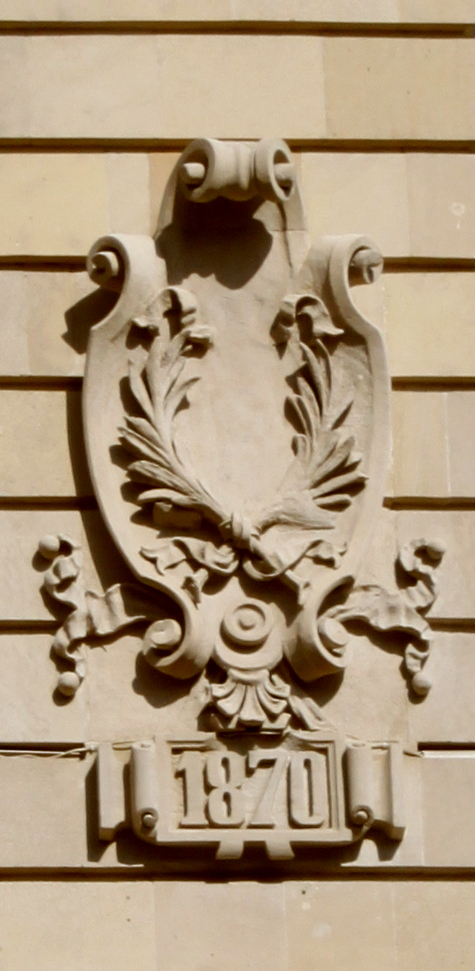
