= Tigran Melikov's House =

Historic mansion of the 19th century in Baku, Azerbaijan

- Azerbaijani: Tiqran Məlikovun evi Armenian: Տիգրան Մելիքովի տուն Polish: Dom Tigrana Melikova
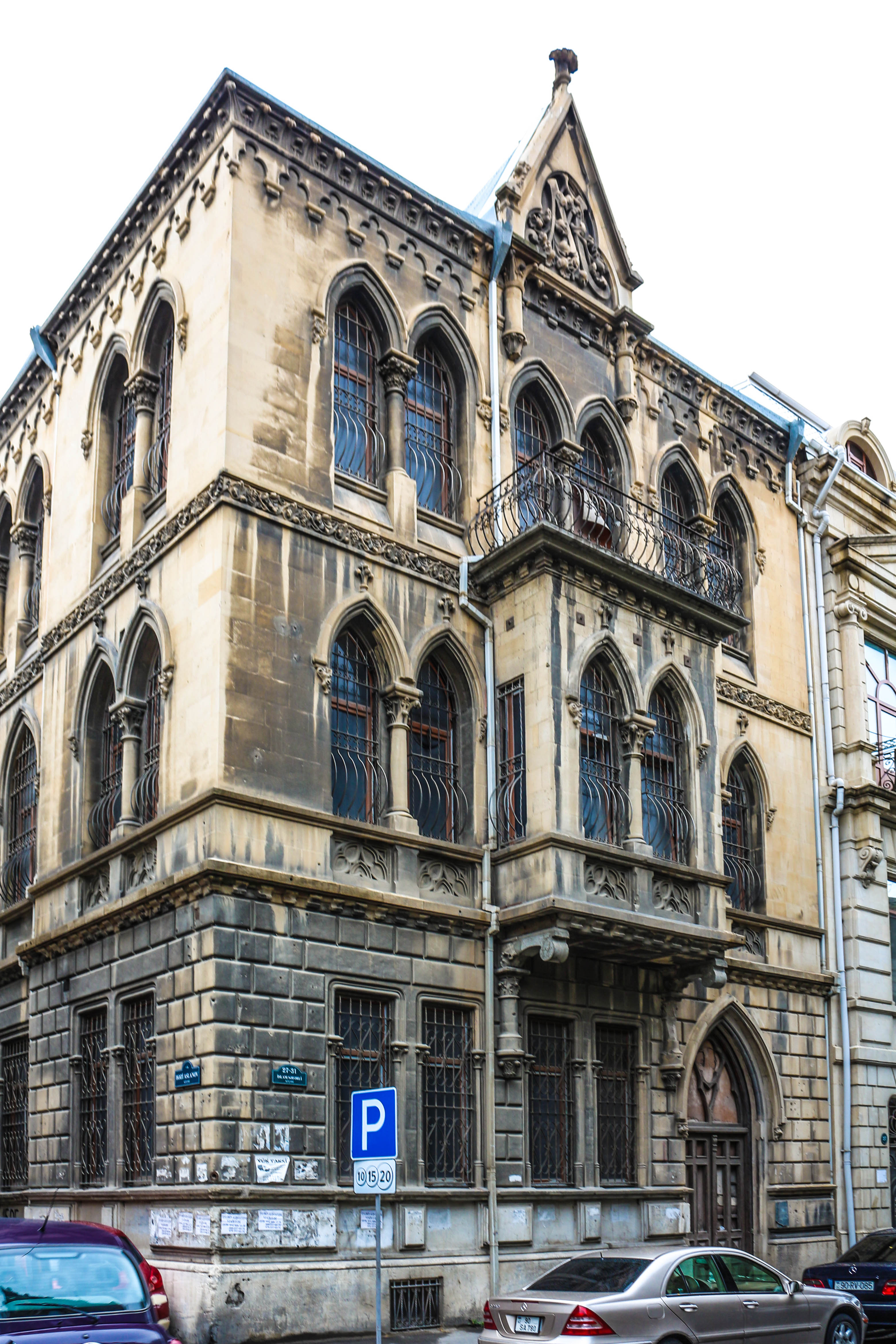

- Location within Azerbaijan
- Alternative names: House of Tigran Melikov

General information
- Type: Mansion
- Architectural style: Venetian Gothic
- Location: Islam Safarli Street, 19, Baku, Azerbaijan
- Coordinates: 40.372922°N 49.834916°E
- Construction started: 1895
- Completed: 1897
- Client: Tigran Melikov

Technical details
- Floor count: 3

Design and construction
- Architect: Józef Gosławski

Tigran Melikov's House (Azerbaijani: Tiqran Məlikovun evi, Armenian: Տիգրան Մելիքովի տուն, Polish: Dom Tigrana Melikova) is an historic mansion located at the intersection of Islam Safarli and Hazi Aslanov streets in Baku, Azerbaijan. The mansion was built between 1895 and 1897 on the order of Tigran Melikov, a brother of the Armenian industrialist Ambarsum Melikov. It is the first building built in the Gothic style in Baku, as well as Józef Gosławski's first project on personal order.

== History ==
In 1813, while establishing the outer-city, the area was given the architectural look of a square, which is still preserved. The mansion was built at crossing of Islam Safarli and Hazi Aslanov streets. Melikov's mansion was the first building to be built in the gothic style in Baku. While building the mansion, Adolf Eichler was preparing a plan of a gothic styled church in 28 May Street.

== Architectural features ==
In terms of the difficulty of the residential building, the individual form of the project is formed in the context of the classical style of Baku. The facades are covered with stones. The mansion is full of windows which helps to enlighten it. The rooms in the south and east and the staircase are brightly lit by a roof lantern.

Lancet windows are used on the two upper floors of the building. On the third floor a balcony opens onto the roof of a second-floor bay window. The bay window contains two main and two additional windows. The narrowest part of the residential property is located in the east. Şamil Fətullayev-Fiqarov notes that Gosławski's facades were influenced by Florentine palaces.

== Gallery ==
House of Hussein Melikov

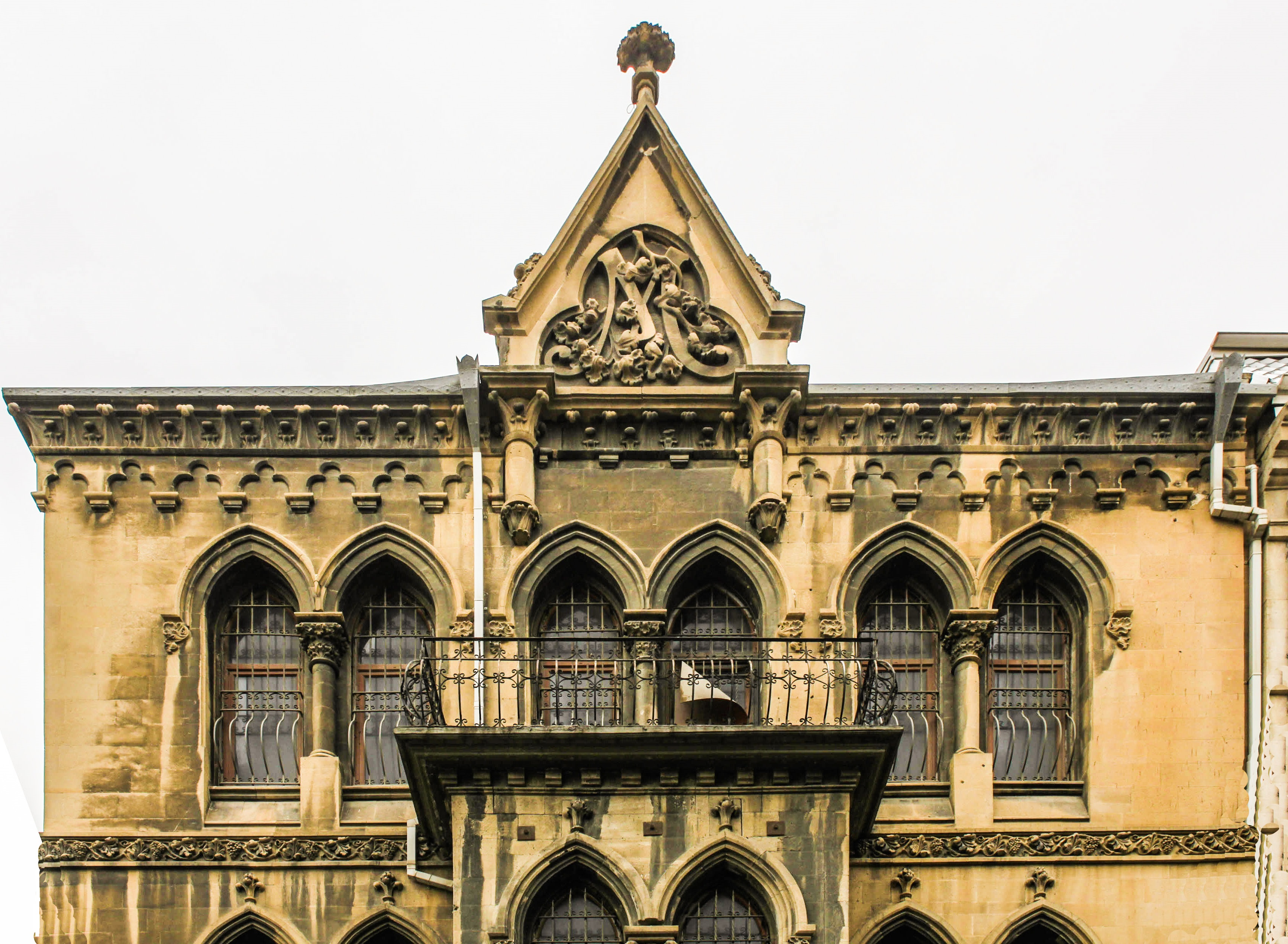
Pediment, on which the Melikovs family emblem is engraved on the eastern facade of the building

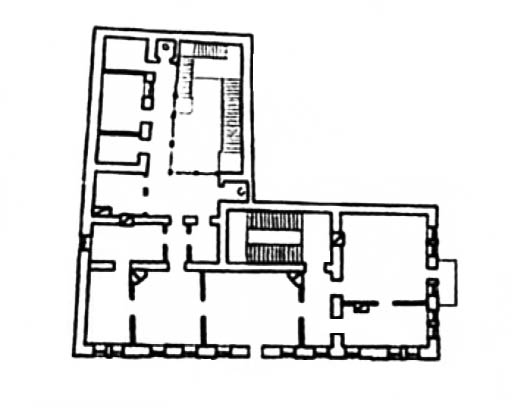
Floor plan of the building

Different views of the mansion

== Sources ==
- Fətullayev-Fiqarov, Şamil (2013) [1998]. Bakının memarlıq ensiklopediyası [Architectural encyclopedia of Baku]. Baku: Şərq-Qərb, Azərbaycan Respubliksı Memarlar İttifaqı.
- Fətullayev-Fiqarov, Şamil (2013). İ.V.Qoslavski - Qafqazlı Rastrelli [.V. Goslavsky - Caucasian Rastrelli]. Baku: Şərq-Qərb, Azərbaycan Respubliksı Memarlar İttifaqı.
- Fətullayev-Fiqarov, Şamil (2013) [1978]. Bakı memarları XIX əsrin sonu - XX əsrin əvvəllərində [Baku architects at the end of the 19th - beginning of the 20th century]. Baku: Şərq-Qərb, Azərbaycan Respubliksı Memarlar İttifaqı.
