= Palace of Zeynalabdin Taghiyev =

Coordinates: 40.3694°N 49.8399°E

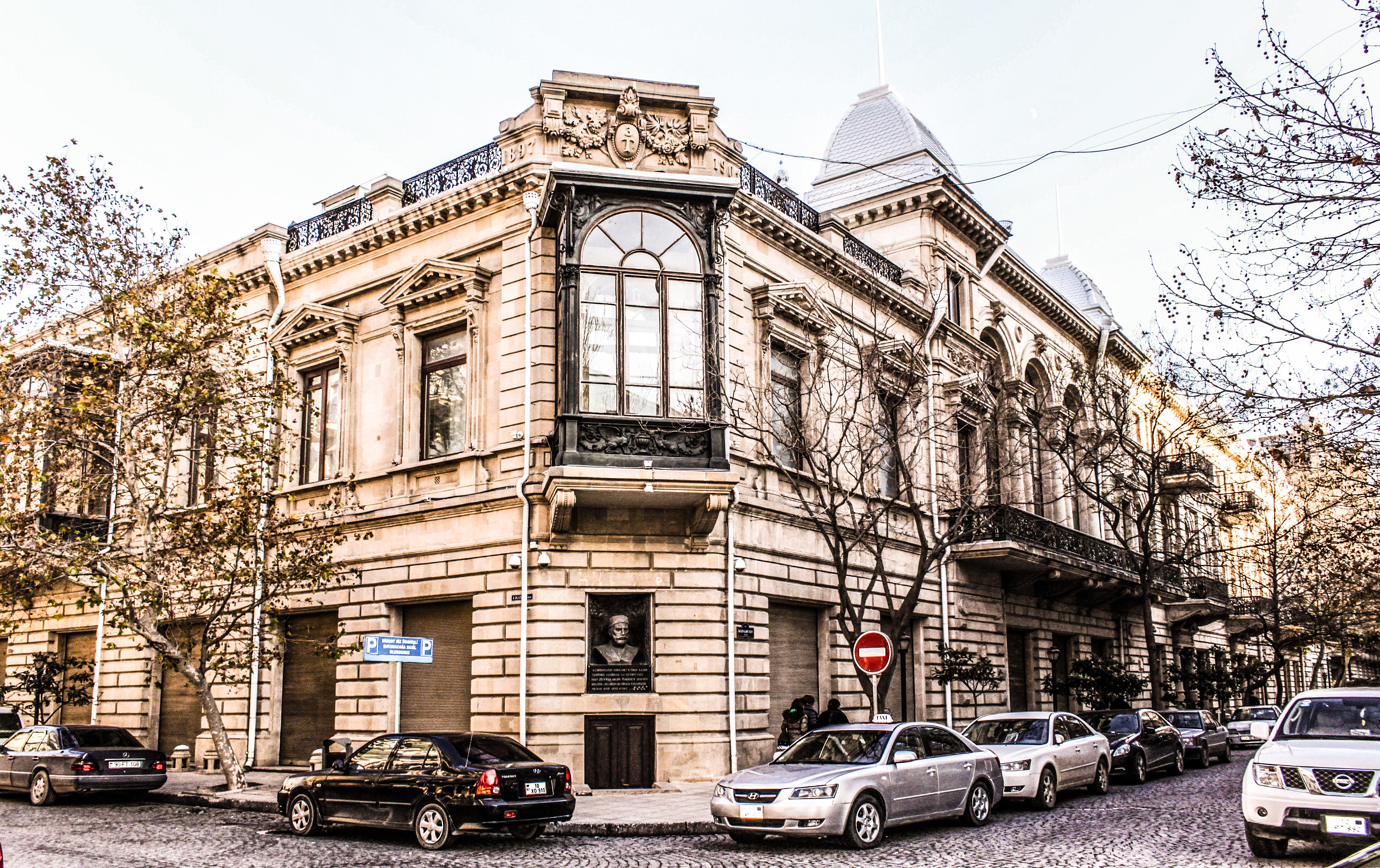
Palace of Zeynalabdin Taghiyev

Palace of Zeynalabdin Taghiyev – Baku, H.Z. Taghiyev Street 4 (former Gorkogovskaya Street 6), previously owned by Baku millionaire Zeynalabdin Taghiyev, and now the palace building houses the National Museum of History of Azerbaijan. The building was constructed in 1893–1902 by Polish civil engineer Józef Gosławski. The palace was Taghiyev's gift for his wife Sona khanim. The building covers a whole quarter in the central part of the city and has an ancient planning structure. The main symmetrical facade has been built in the forms of Italian Renaissance. During the construction of the palace, Goslawski used classic order, but some elements of the composition and interiors of the halls were inspired by Azerbaijani architectural traditions. Various architectural styles were used during the construction of the palace.

== History ==
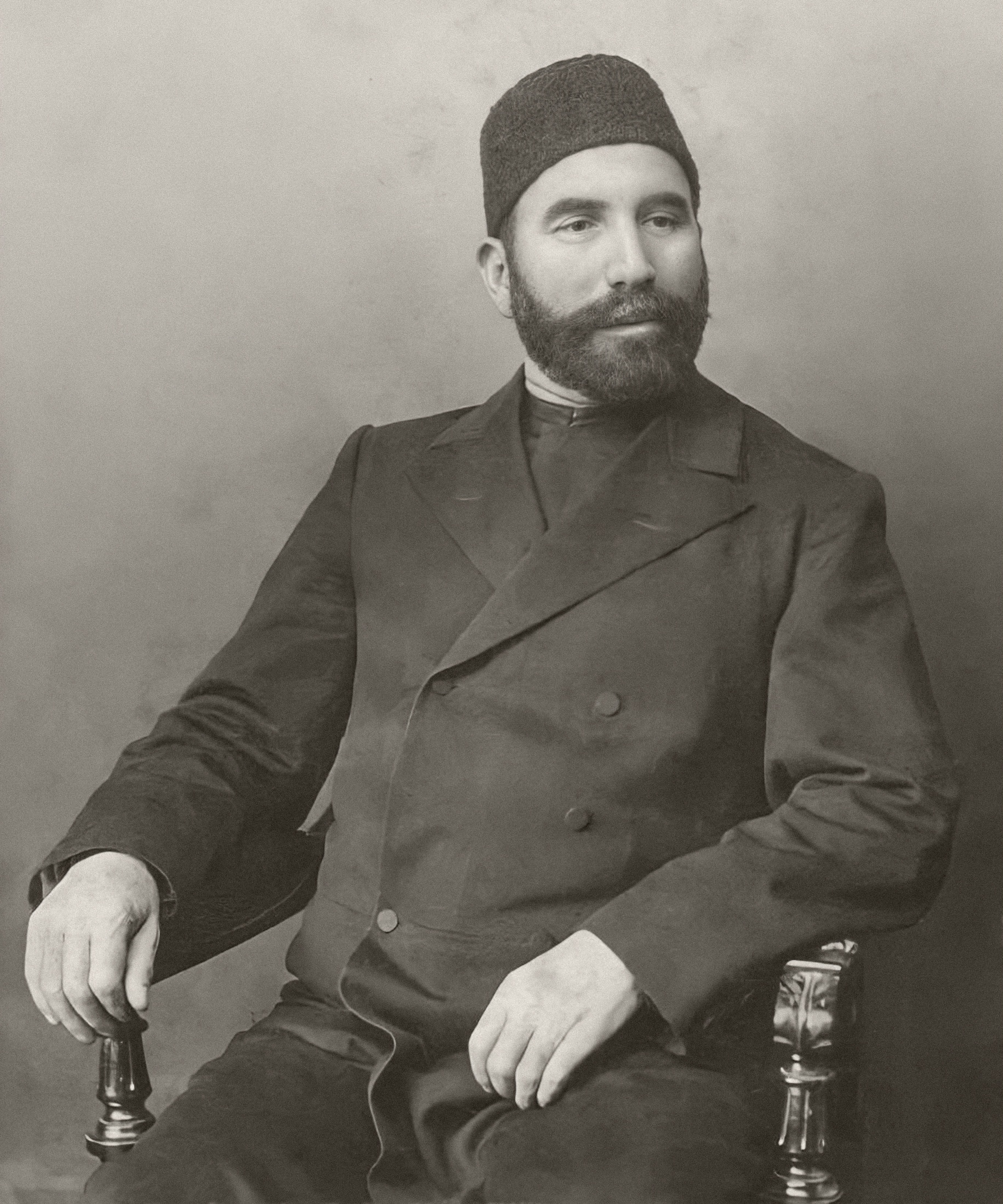
Zeynalabdin Taghiyev in early years of 20th century

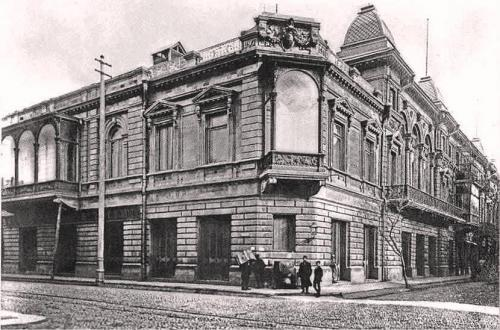
Taghiyev's palace in 1950

H.Z. Taghiyev was the customer of Goslawski's architectural works. Examples of these works are Taghiyev's palace, the Muslim girls' school, Taghiyev's villa in Mardakan, Taghiyev's Caucasian-made textile factory building. Goslawski also took part in designing a dwelling house built on the corner of Zarifa Aliyeva Street (former Mercuryev Street), where H.Z.Taghiyev's theater was built. Thus, according to the scale of Baku, a small complex consisting of the architect's works appeared in one of the central areas.

Construction works were started in 1895 on the streets of Gorkovskaya and Mercuryevskaya. It was assumed from the words inscribed on the building facade. According to some sources, after the completion of the first part of the building, this part was given to Volzhko-Kamsky (Volzhsko-Kamsky) bank. The construction materials used for the building, as well as equipment, furniture, chandeliers and interior were brought from Russia and Western Europe and foreign craftsmen and artists were invited. It was reported that 270 people were employed as engineers, architects, carpenters and other masters at the construction of Taghiyev's palace.

All equipment inside the palace was imported from Russia, France, America, Germany. In the house heat and cooling systems were installed. 40 thousand rubles of gold were worked out by the masters on the ceiling patterns. The pillars of the palace decorated with diamond and colored mirror bottles, and the floor was covered with natural birch planks from Russia. Furniture from America, pictures and curtains were brought from Germany. Only 1.2 million rubles were spent on construction of the building (without imports of furniture and equipment from abroad).

Since 1914, the Baku Treasury Bank headed by H.Z.Taghiyev was also in the palace. In April 1920, the Bolsheviks, who had taken power in Azerbaijan, confiscated the Taghiyev palace, and a part of the State History Museum had begun to operate. In 1941–1954, the Museum of History was transferred to the Shirvanshahs palace. In 1954, the second floor of the building was returned to the History Museum. On the first floor, the Technical and Medical Documents Archive was placed. All Tagiyev's property was handed over to the Azerbaijani History Museum in just 2000. Taghiyev palace has been reconstructed several times.

== Gallery ==
Different views of the palace

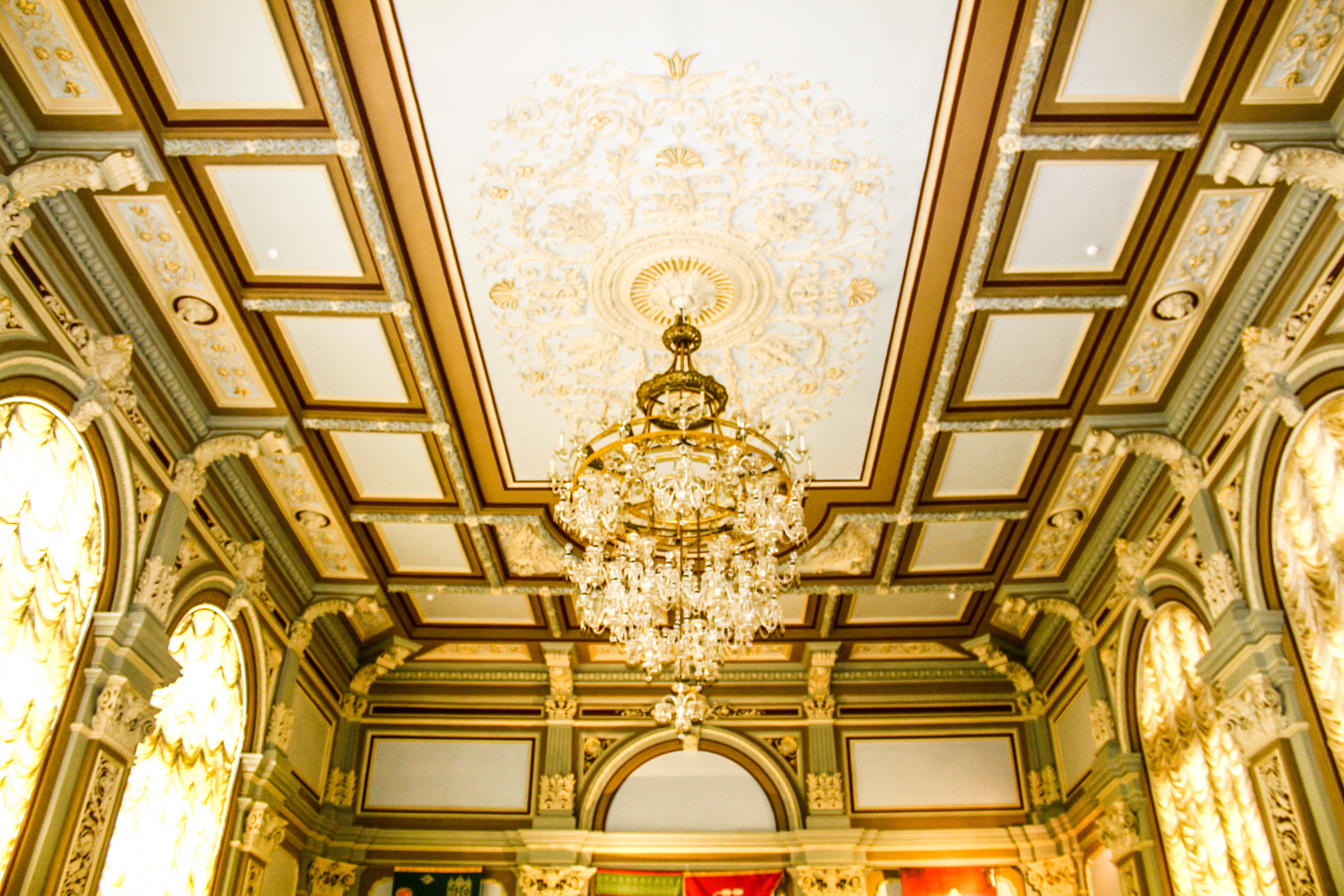

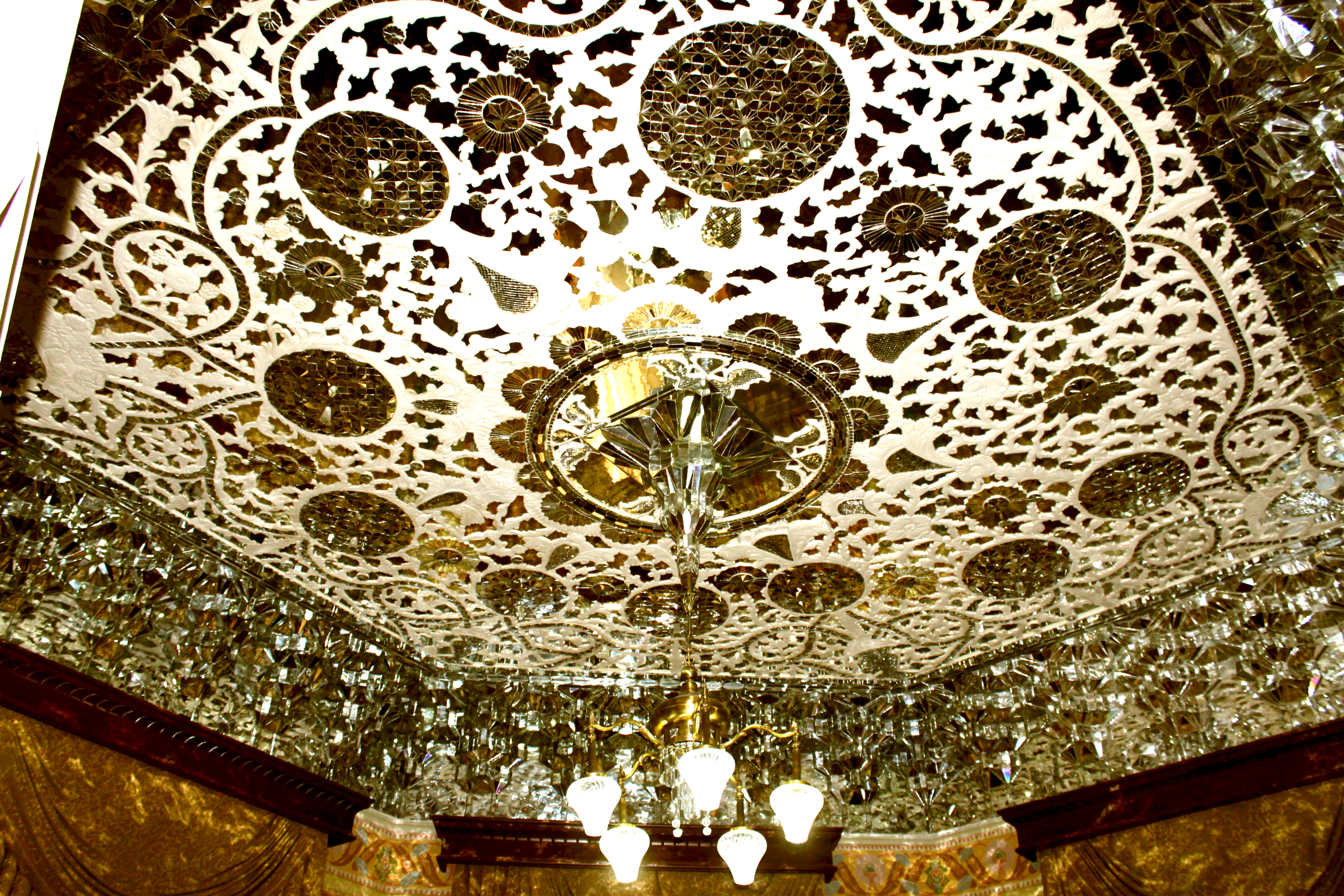

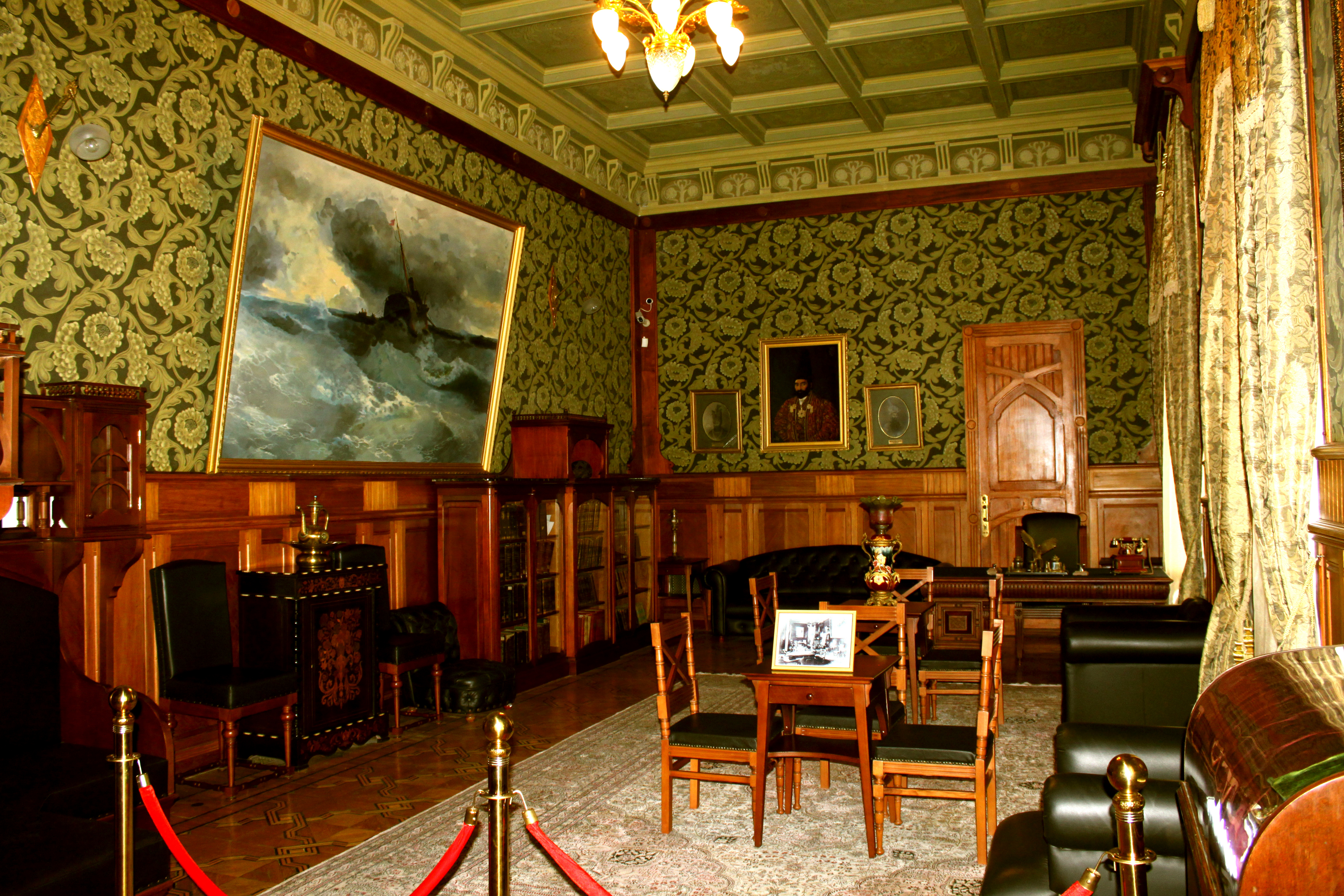

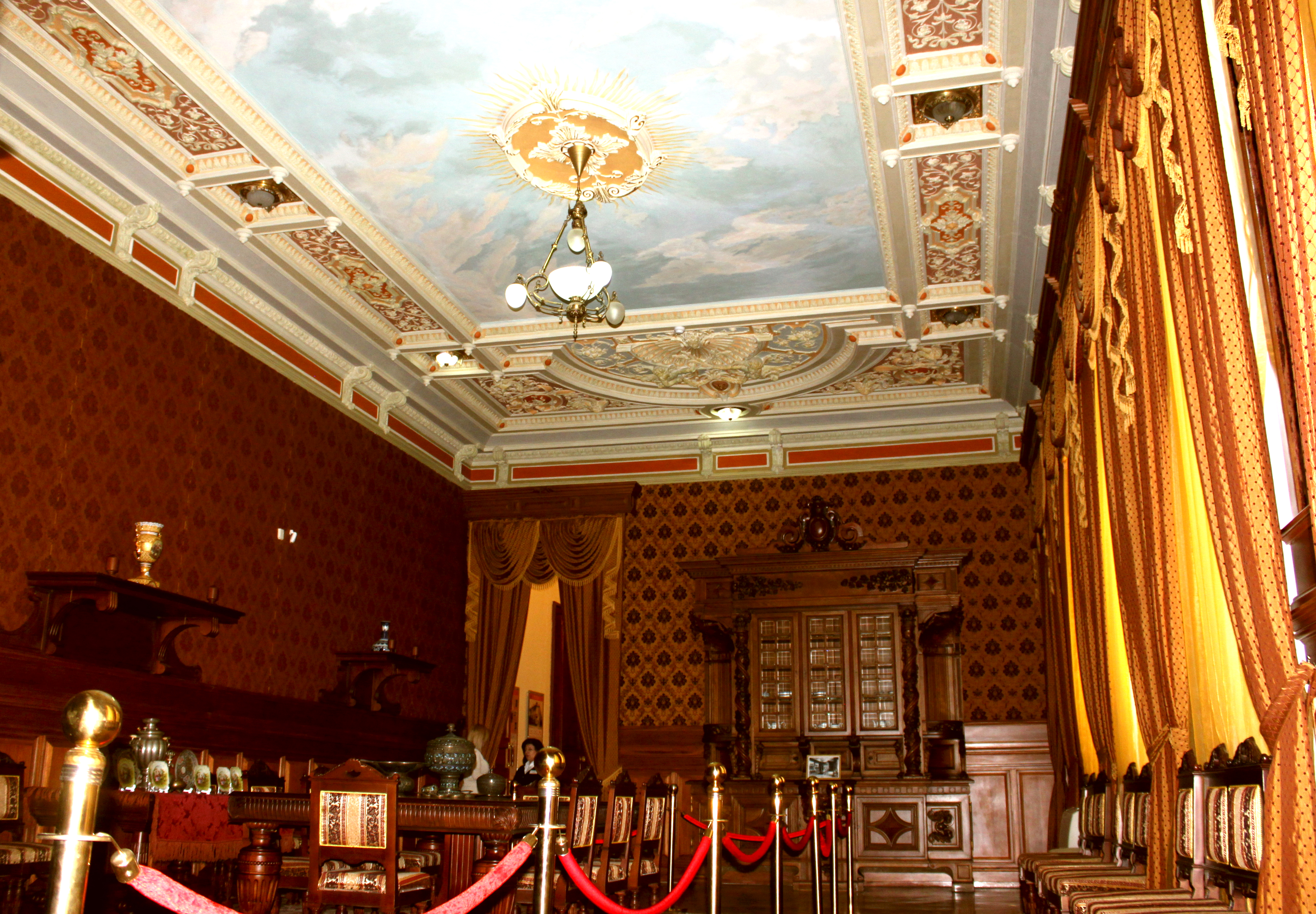

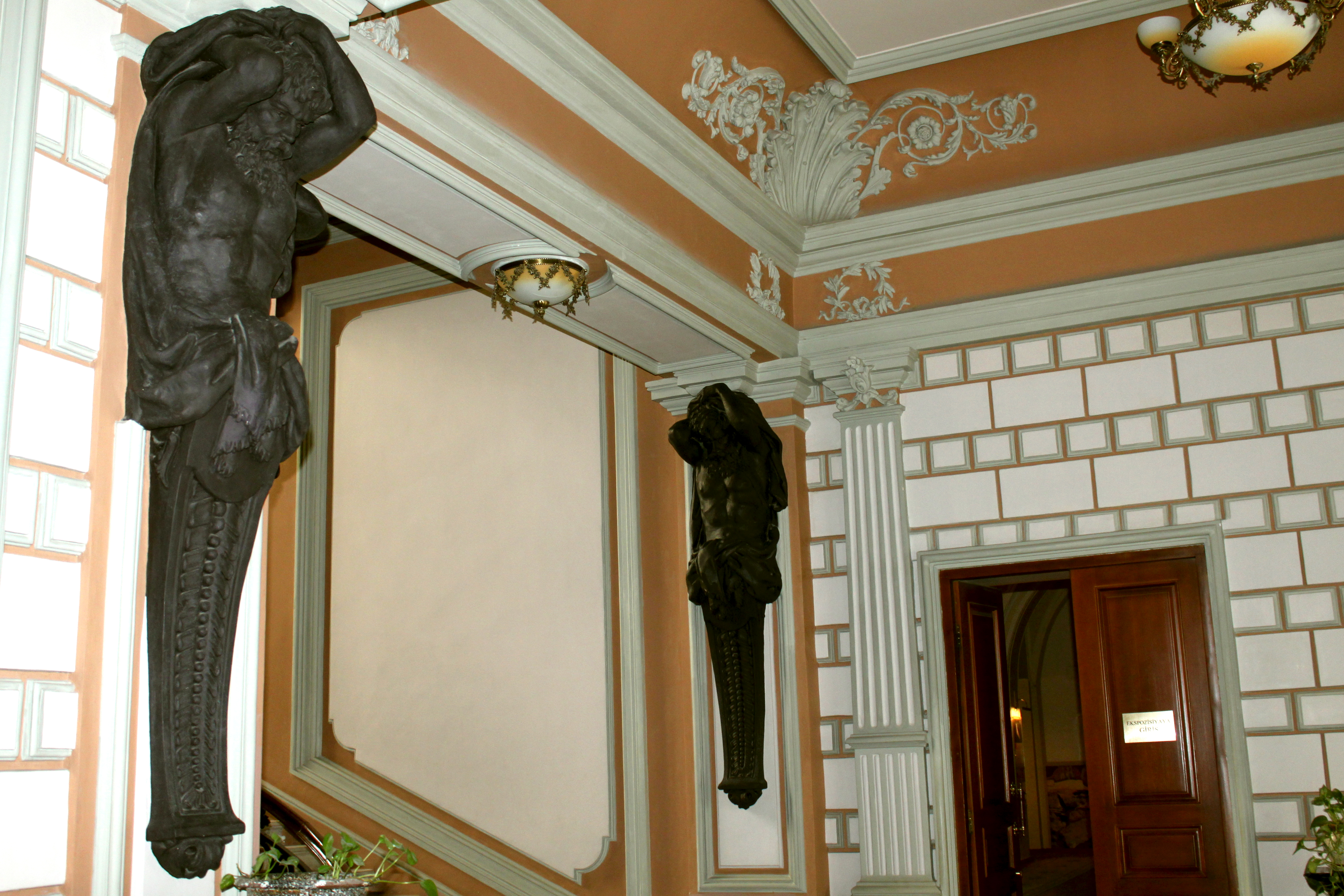

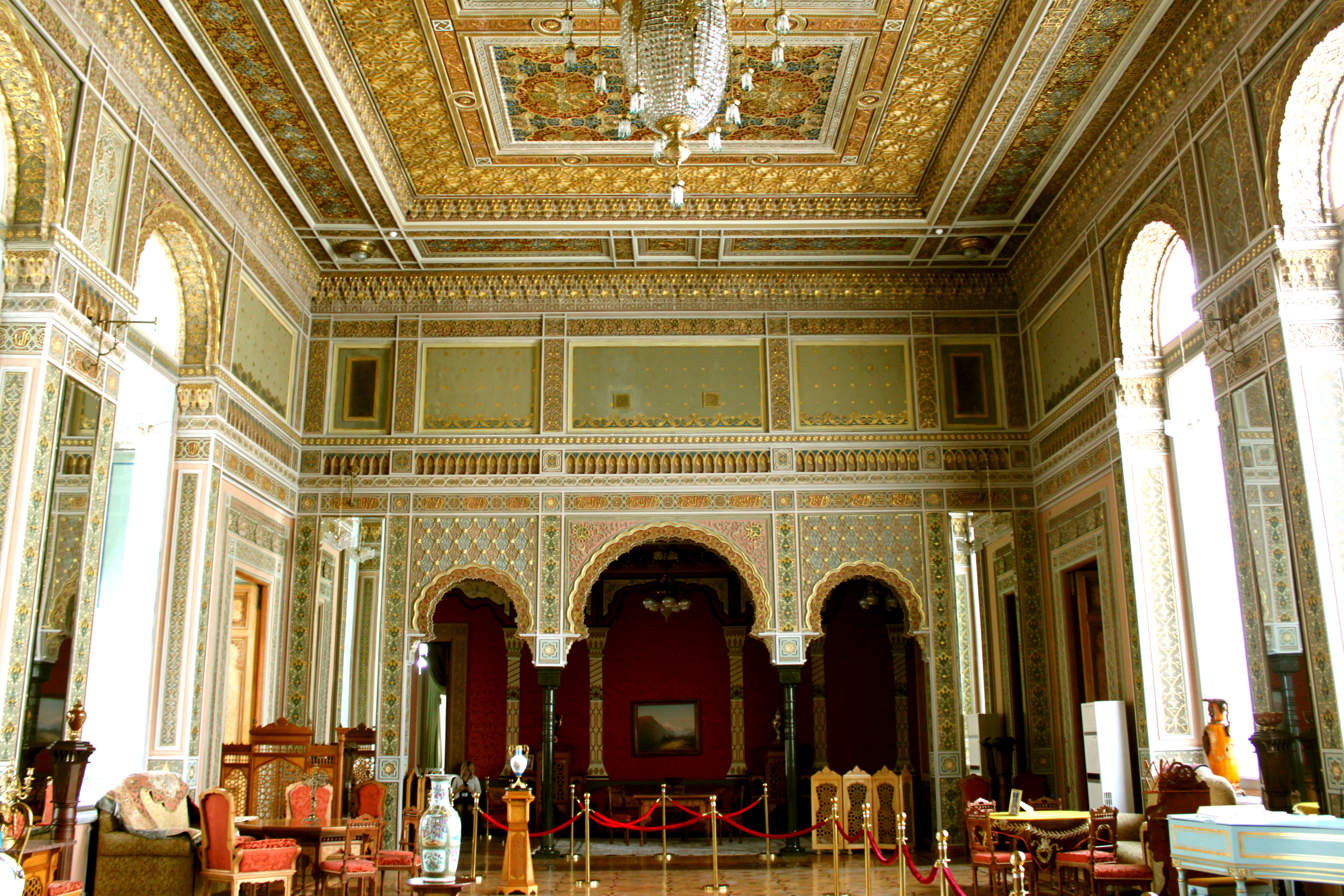

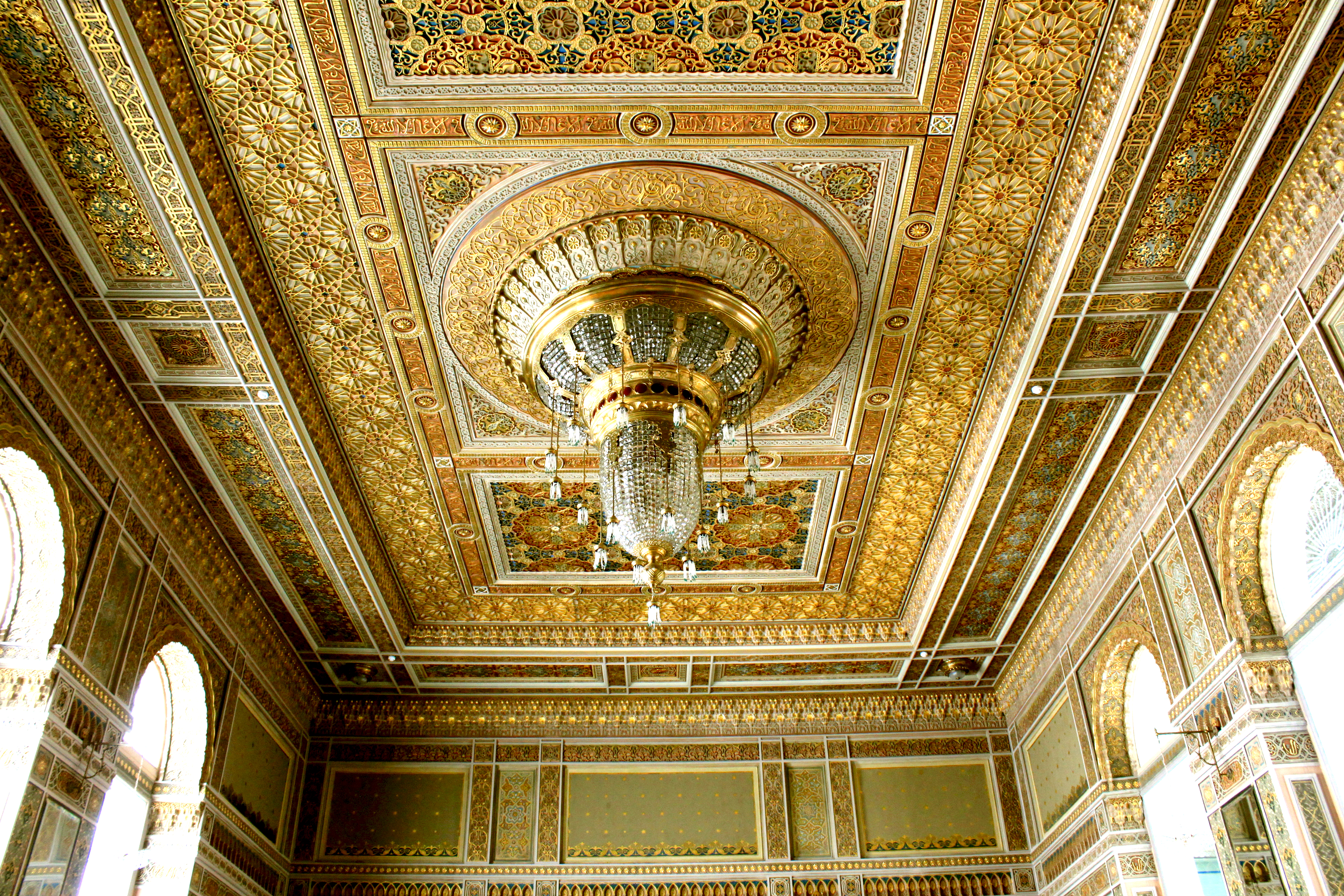

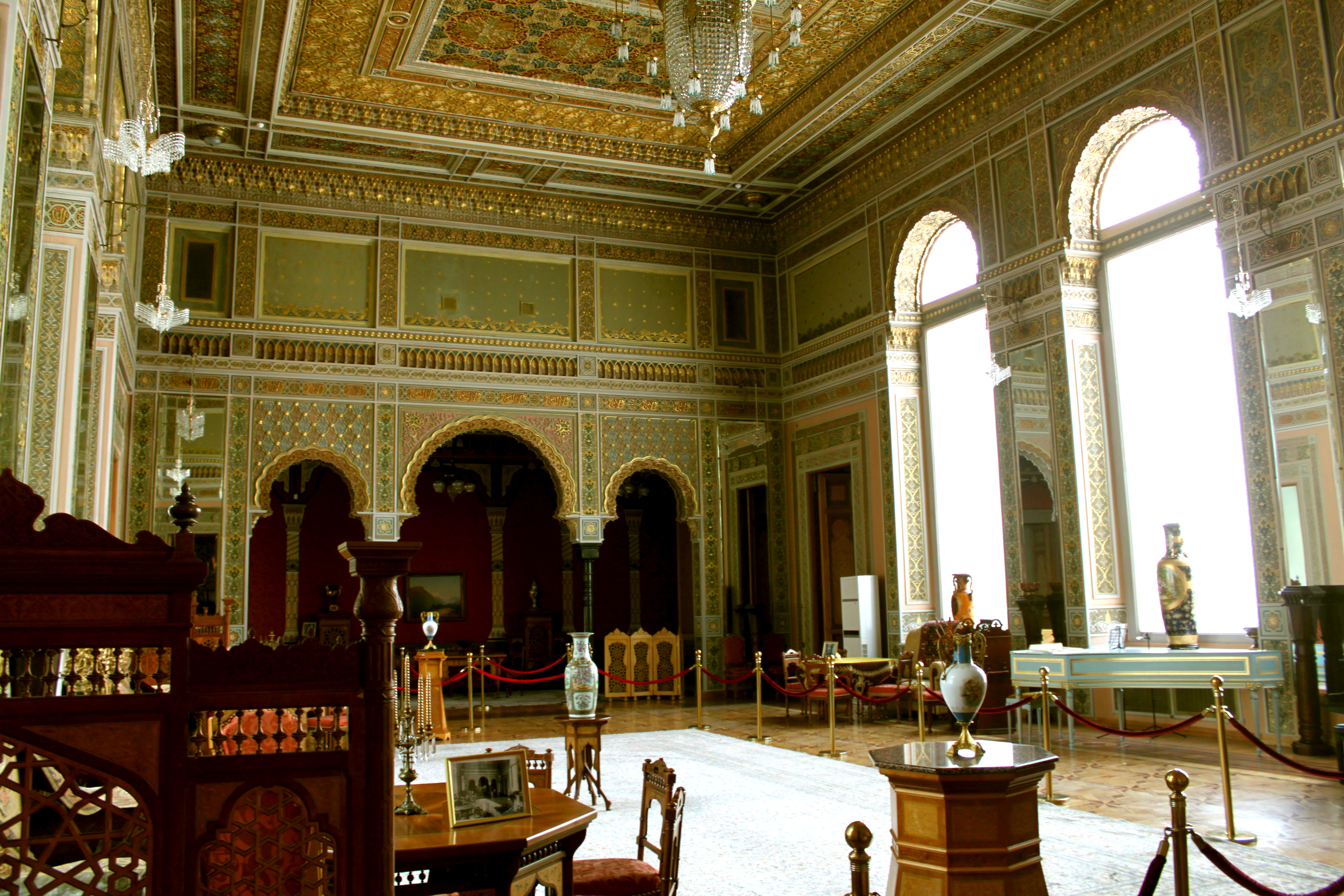

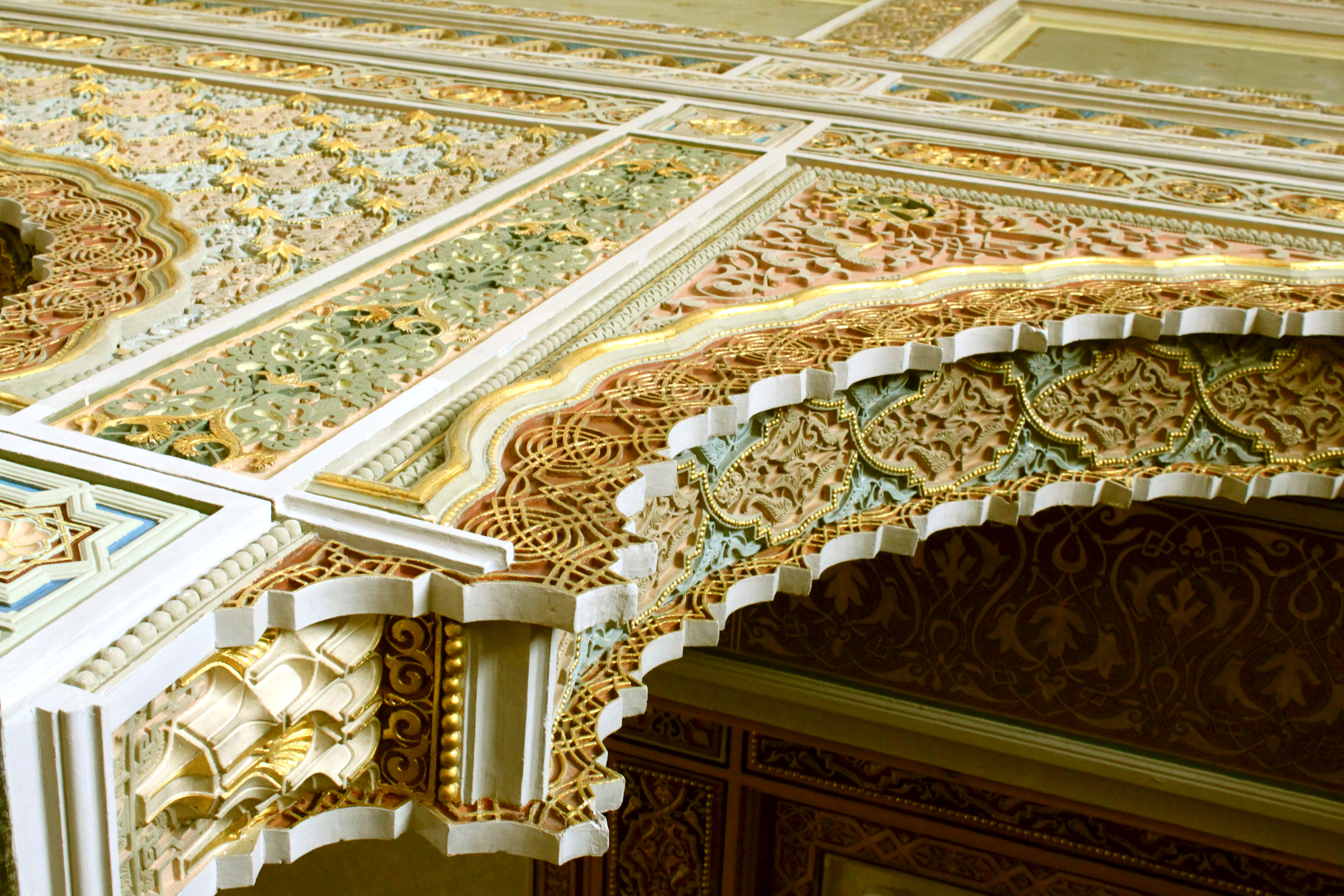

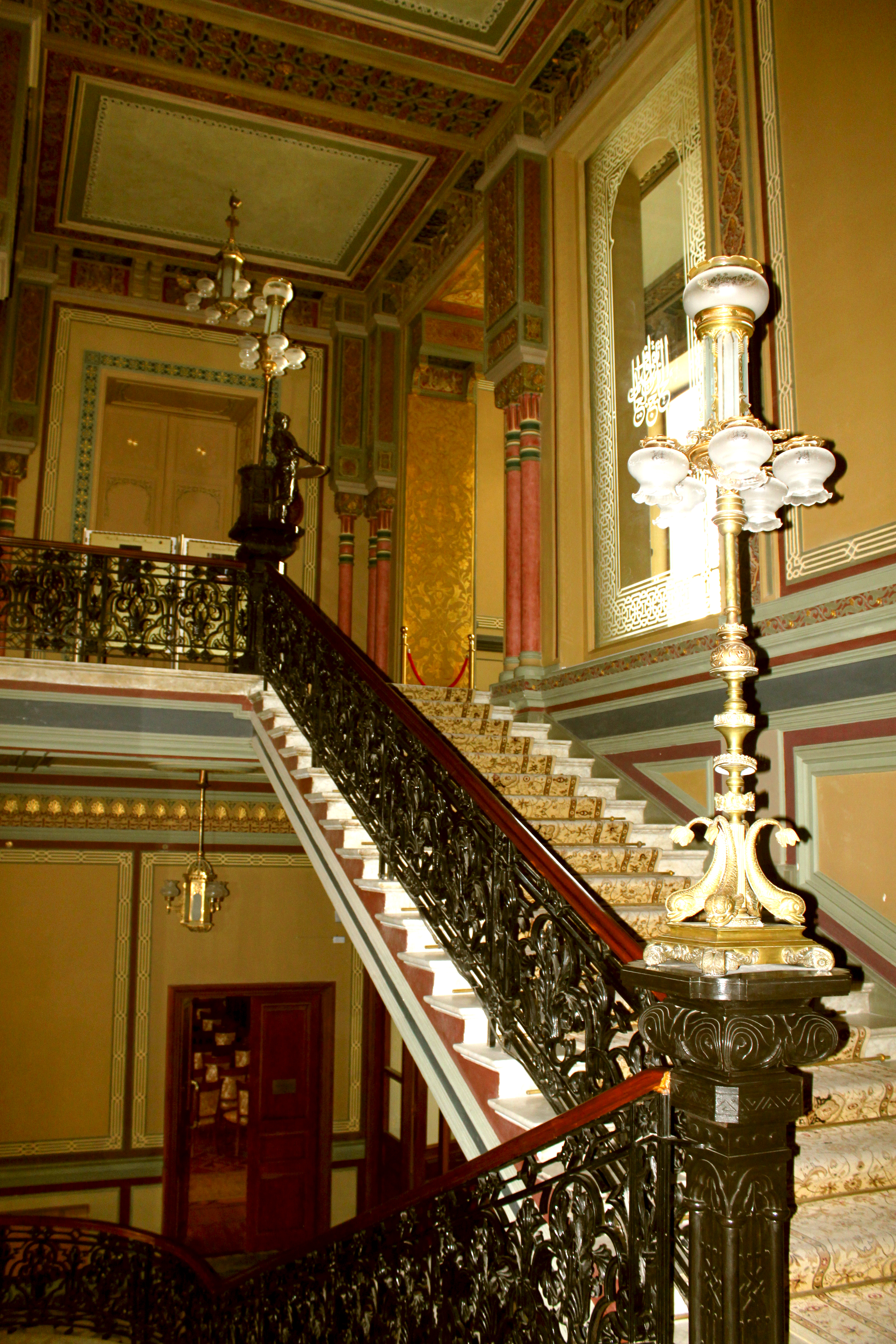

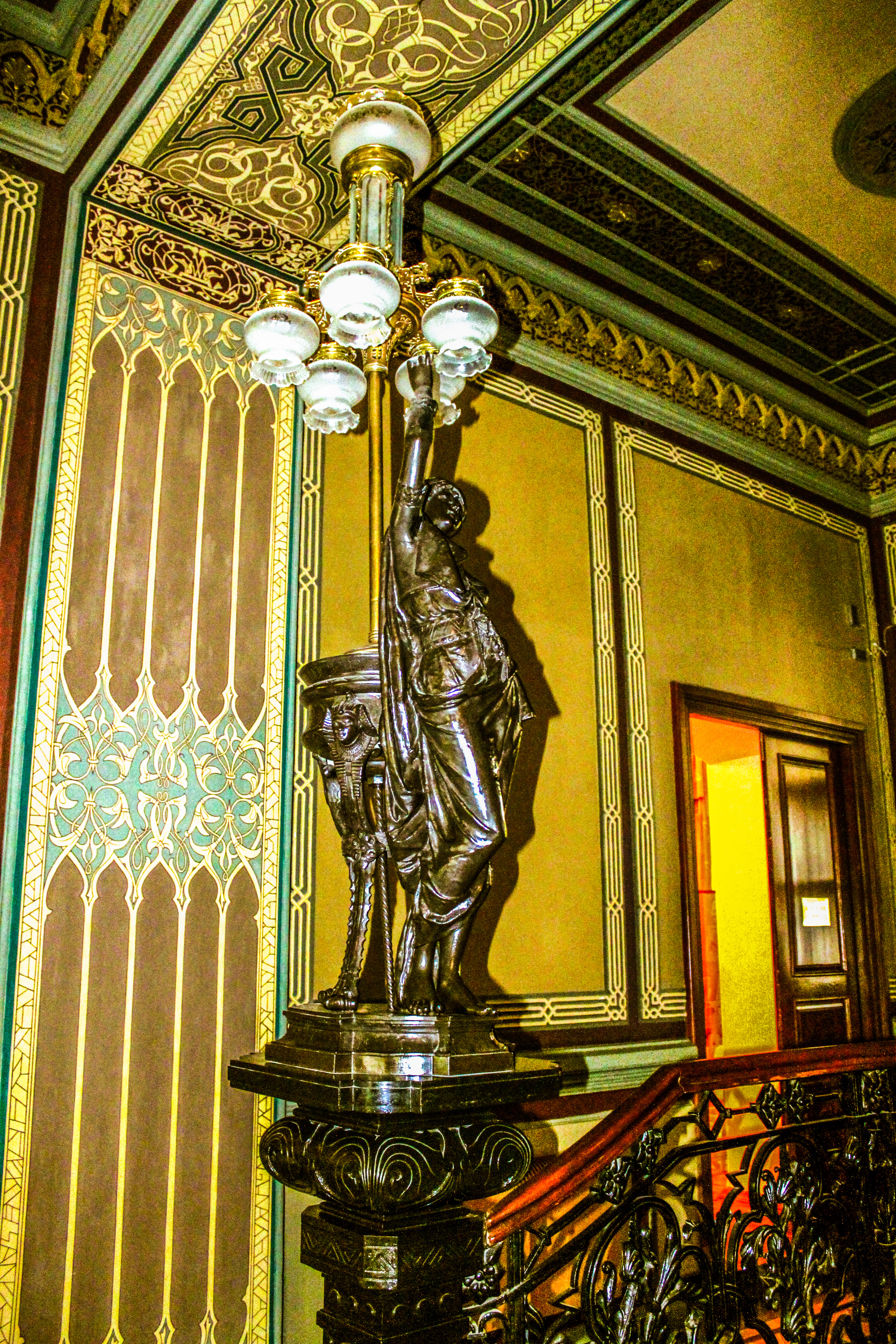

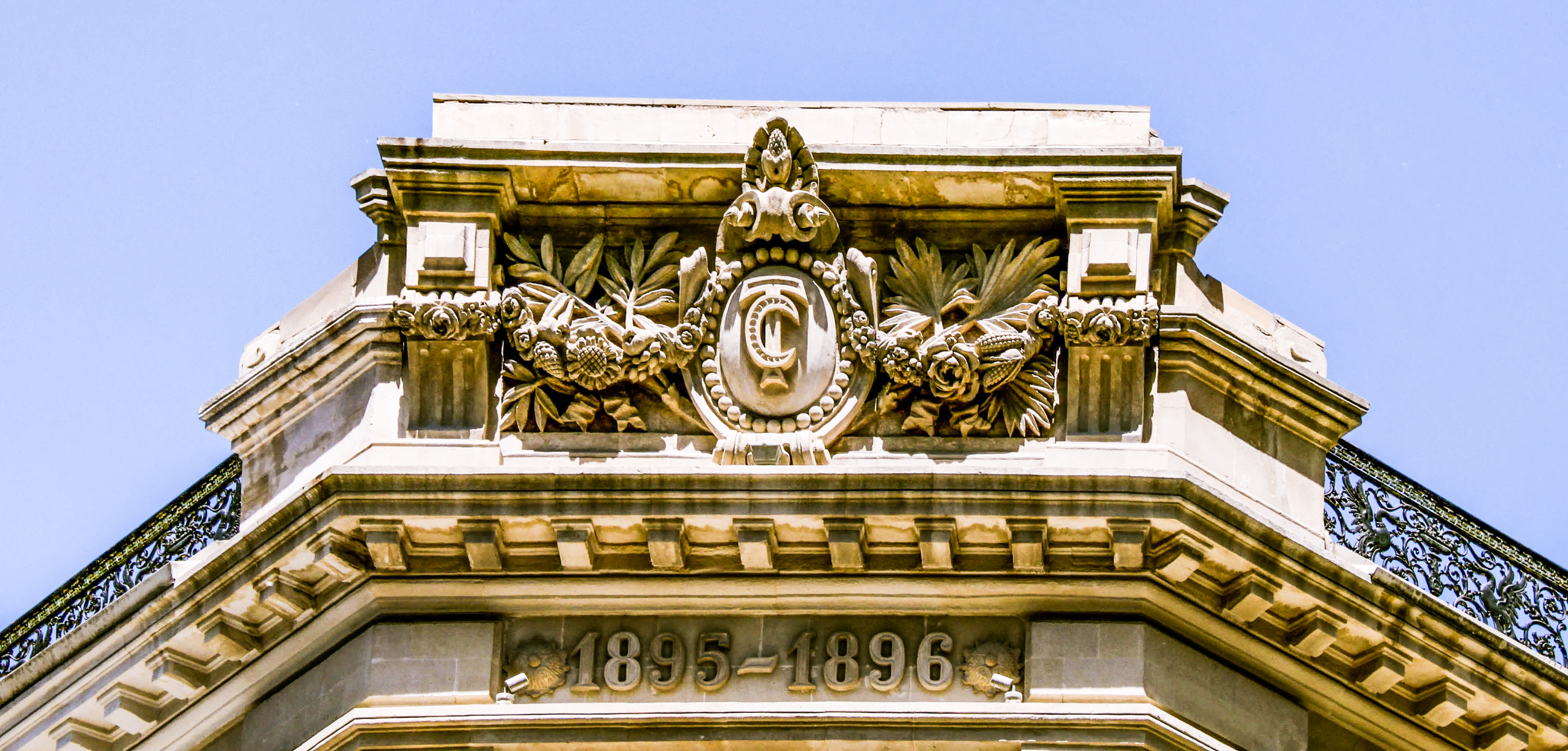
