= Józef Gosławski (architect) =

Polish architect

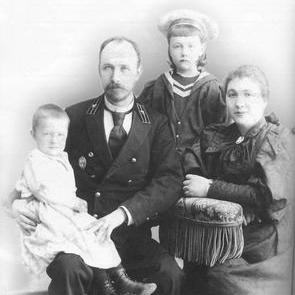
- Józef Gosławski with his family in Baku
- Born: 1865; Warsaw, Congress Poland
- Died: 30 January 1904 (aged 38); Baku, Baku Governorate
- Occupation: Architect
- Buildings: Building of Mayoralty of Baku, Palace of Zeynalabdin Taghiyev, Empress Alexandra Russian Muslim Boarding School for Girls, Tigran Melikov's House

Józef Gosławski, also known as Iosif Vikentievich Goslavsky (Russian: Иосиф Викентьевич Гославский; 1865 – 30 January 1904) was a Polish architect mainly active in Baku, Azerbaijan.

== Life and contributions ==
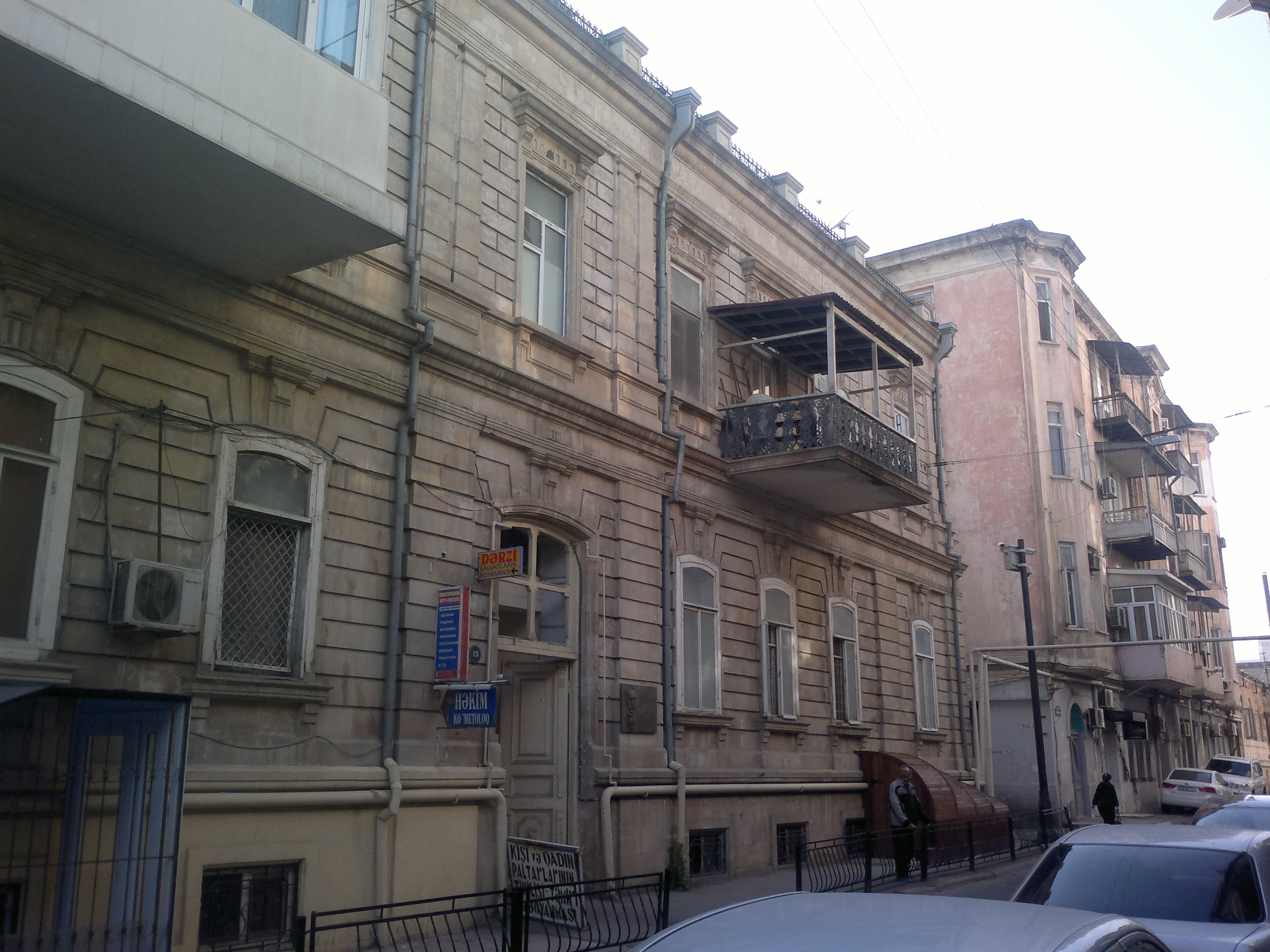
House in Baku, where Józef Gosławski lived

Józef Gosławski was born near Warsaw in Congress Poland to a noble Polish family. In 1891, he graduated from the Institute of Civil Engineering in Saint Petersburg, and a year later he was appointed chief architect of the city of Baku (present-day capital of Azerbaijan). His first task was to assist the local architect Robert Marfeld in designing and supervising the construction of the largest church in the Caucasus, the Alexander Nevsky Cathedral of Baku.

The building of the grandiose cathedral was completed in 1898 with the help of Baku's Eastern Orthodox, Muslim and Jewish communities who provided funding in addition to the money provided by the government. Gosławski's other architectural contributions in Baku were the Taghiyev Residence (present-day Azerbaijan State Museum of History), the Empress Alexandra Russian Muslim Boarding School for Girls (present-day Fuzuli Institute of Manuscripts of the National Academy of Sciences of Azerbaijan), a number of industrial buildings and houses. Gosławski's final creation was the City Duma (present-day Baku City Hall), whose both exterior and interior was designed by him. The construction of the building, which even today remains one of the major sights in Baku, cost 400,000 golden roubles. However, Gosławski never lived to see the completion of the construction. He died in Baku at the age of 38 of tuberculosis, several months before the opening of the Duma. At the time of his death, Józef Gosławski was married and had three children.

On 30 August 2006, President of Azerbaijan Ilham Aliyev signed an act, affirming the placing of commemorative plaque at Gosławski's house in Baku, at 31 Mirza Ibrahimov Street. On 11 June 2008, First Lady of Poland Maria Kaczyńska officially unveiled the plaque devoted to the Polish architect in Baku.

== Gallery ==
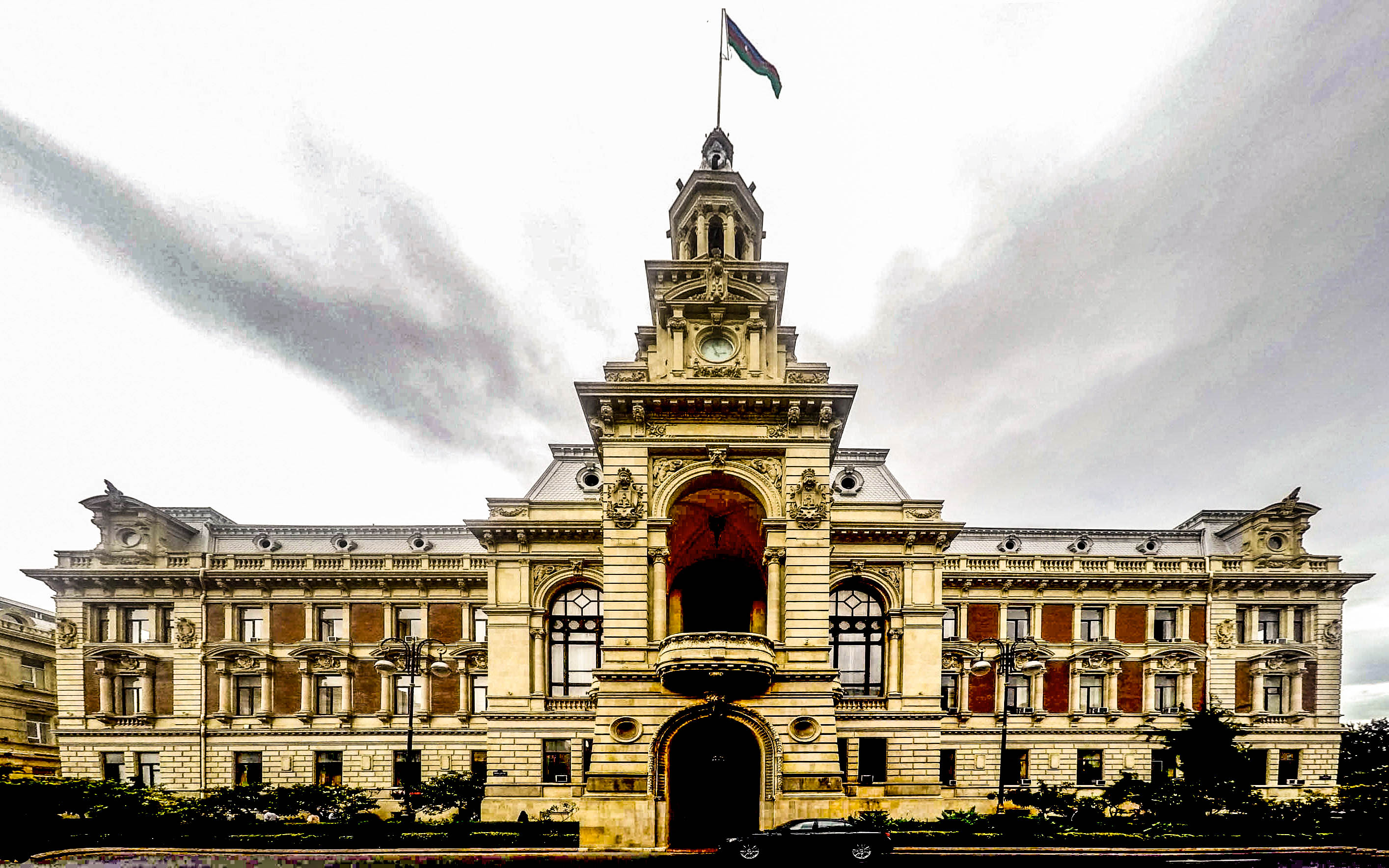
Mayoralty of Baku

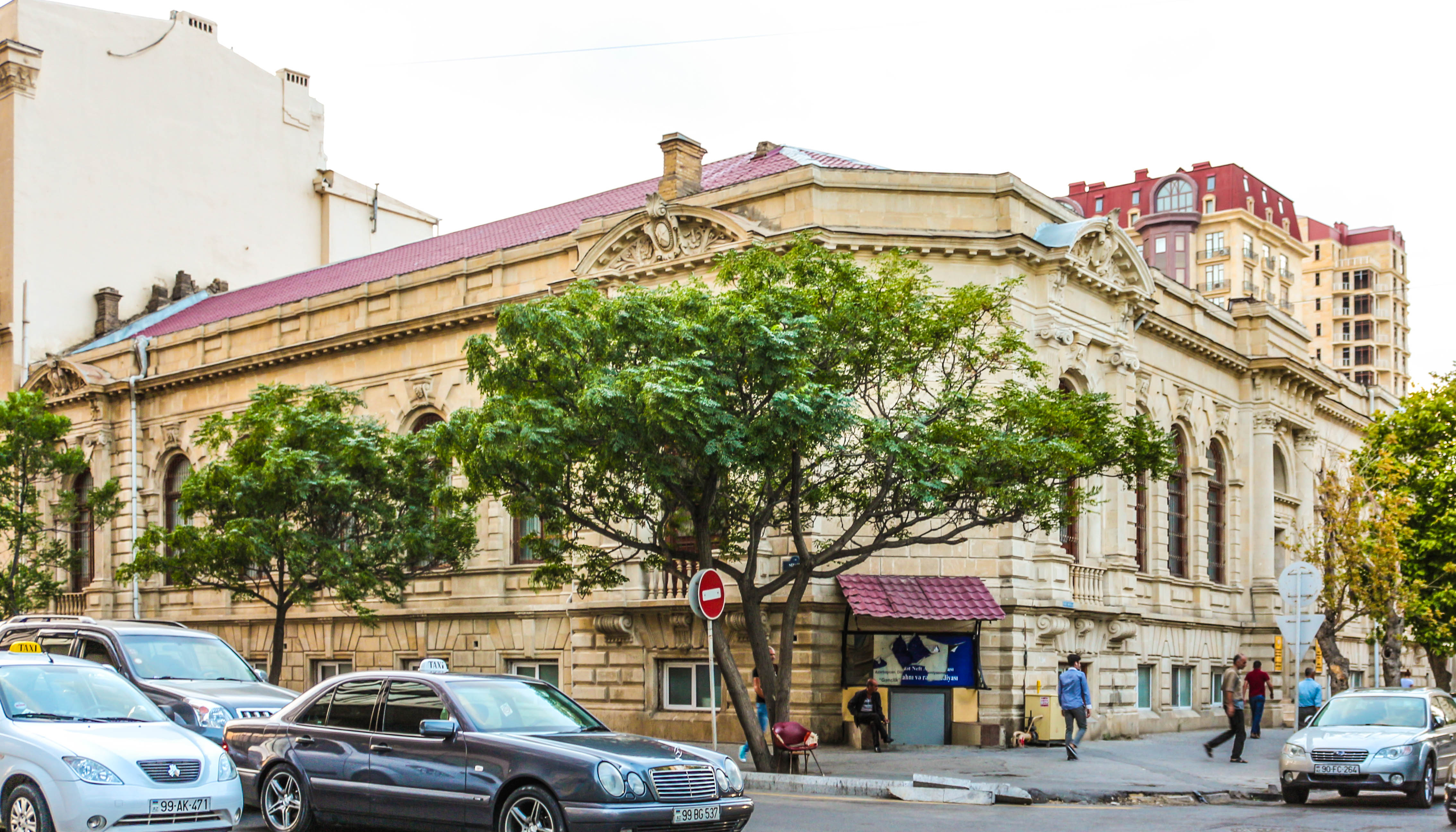
Building of the former Baku Department of Russian Technical Society

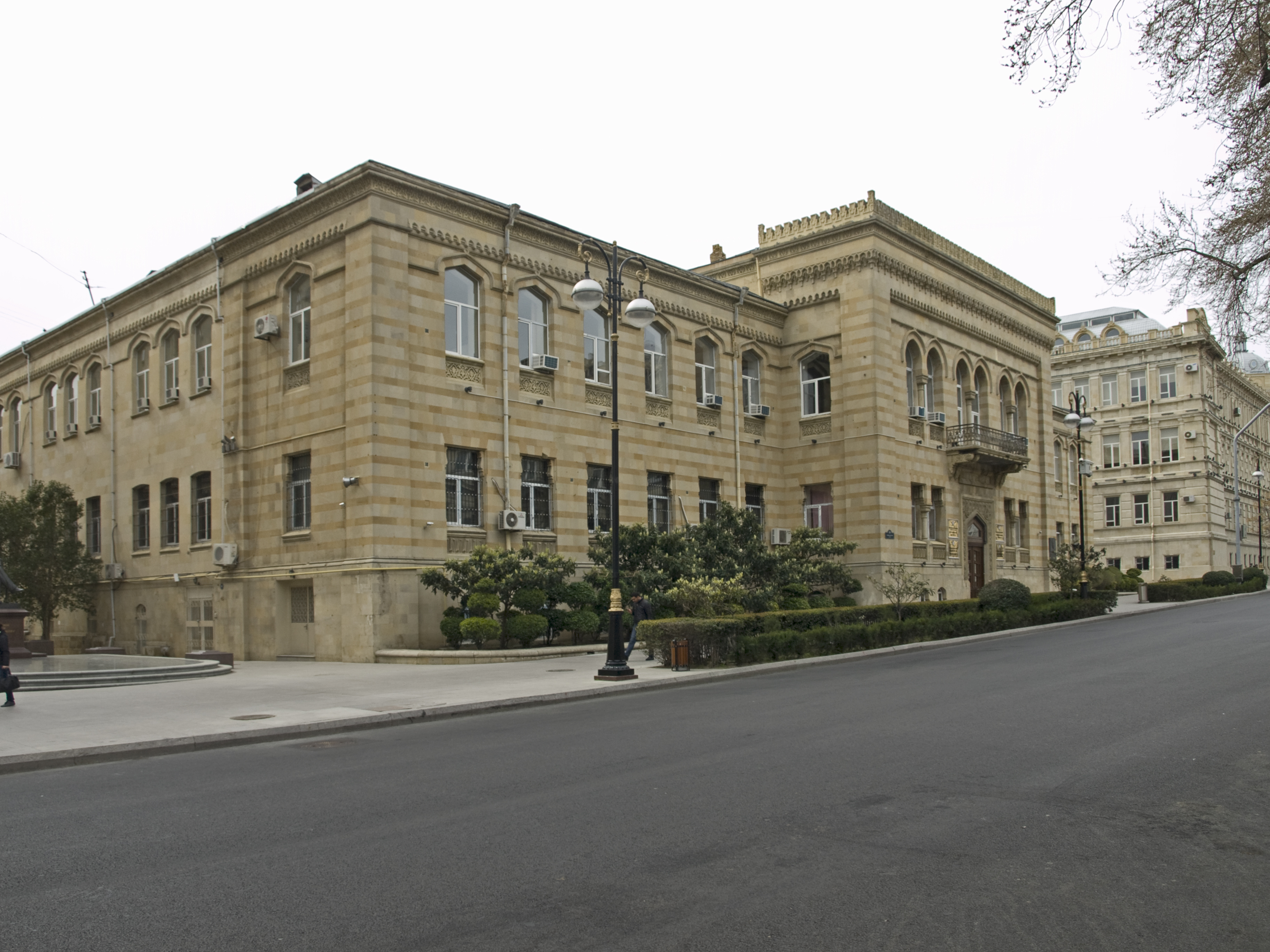
Institute of Manuscripts, Baku

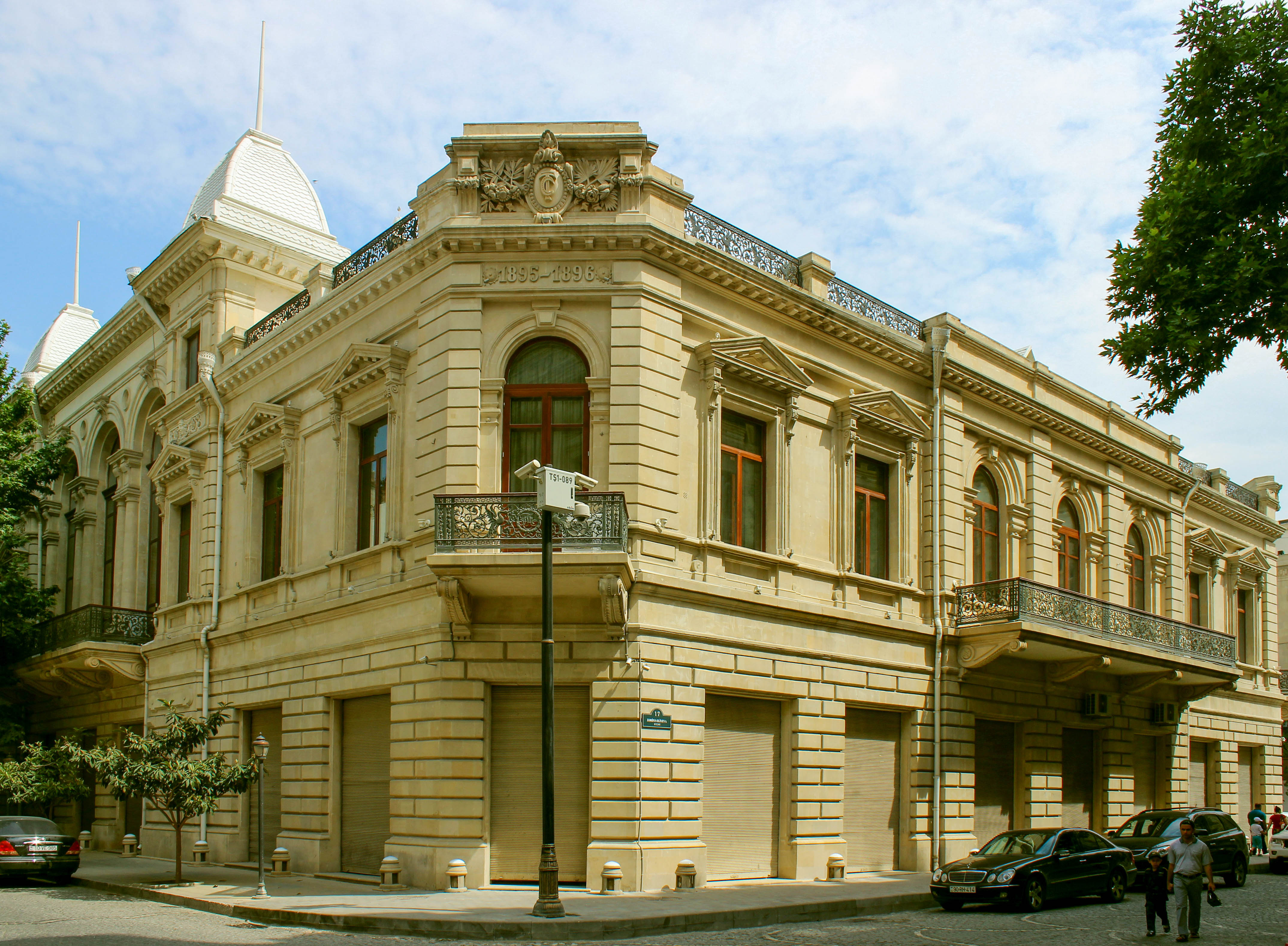
National Museum of History of Azerbaijan

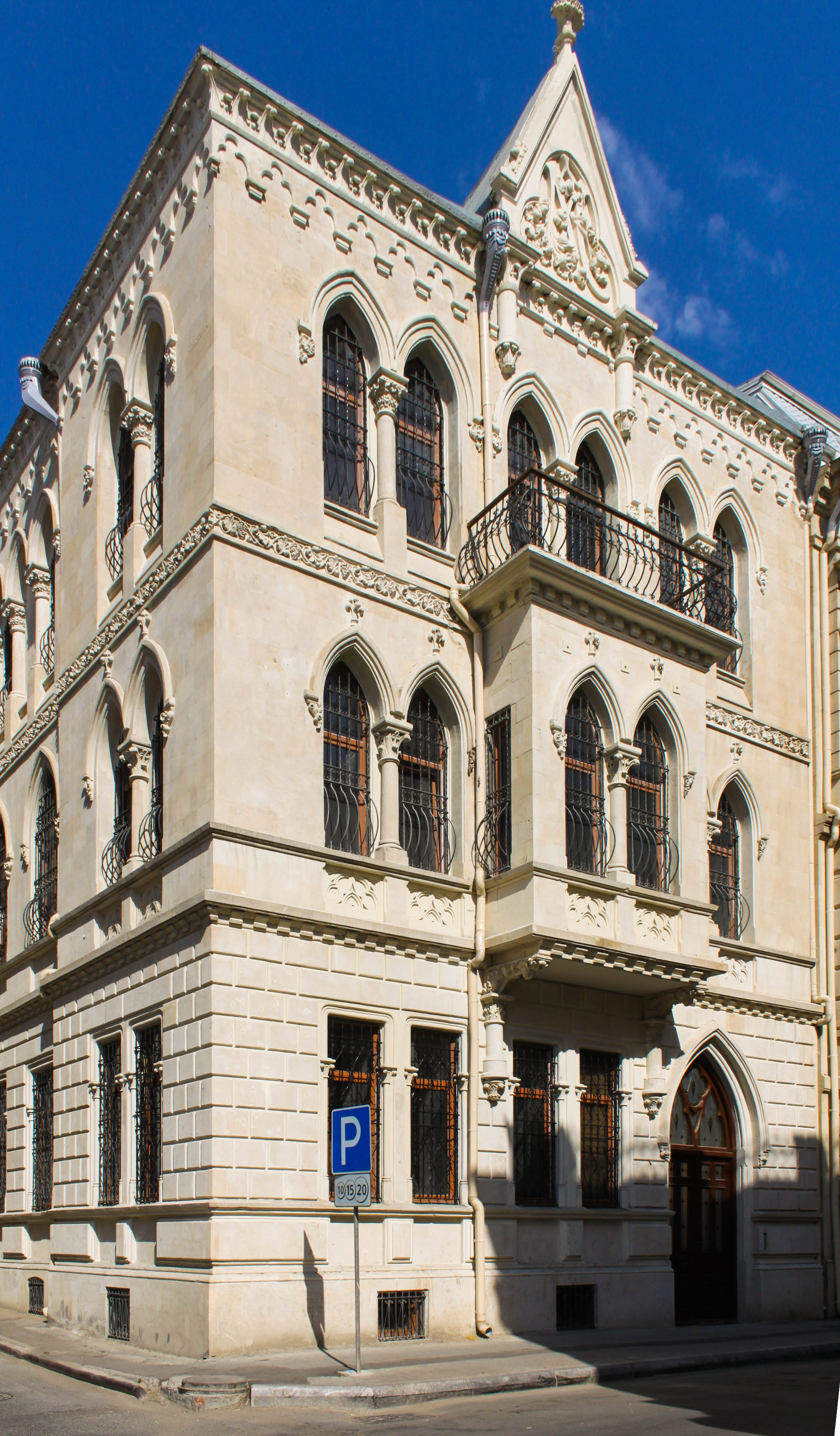
Townhouse at Islam Safarli Street 19

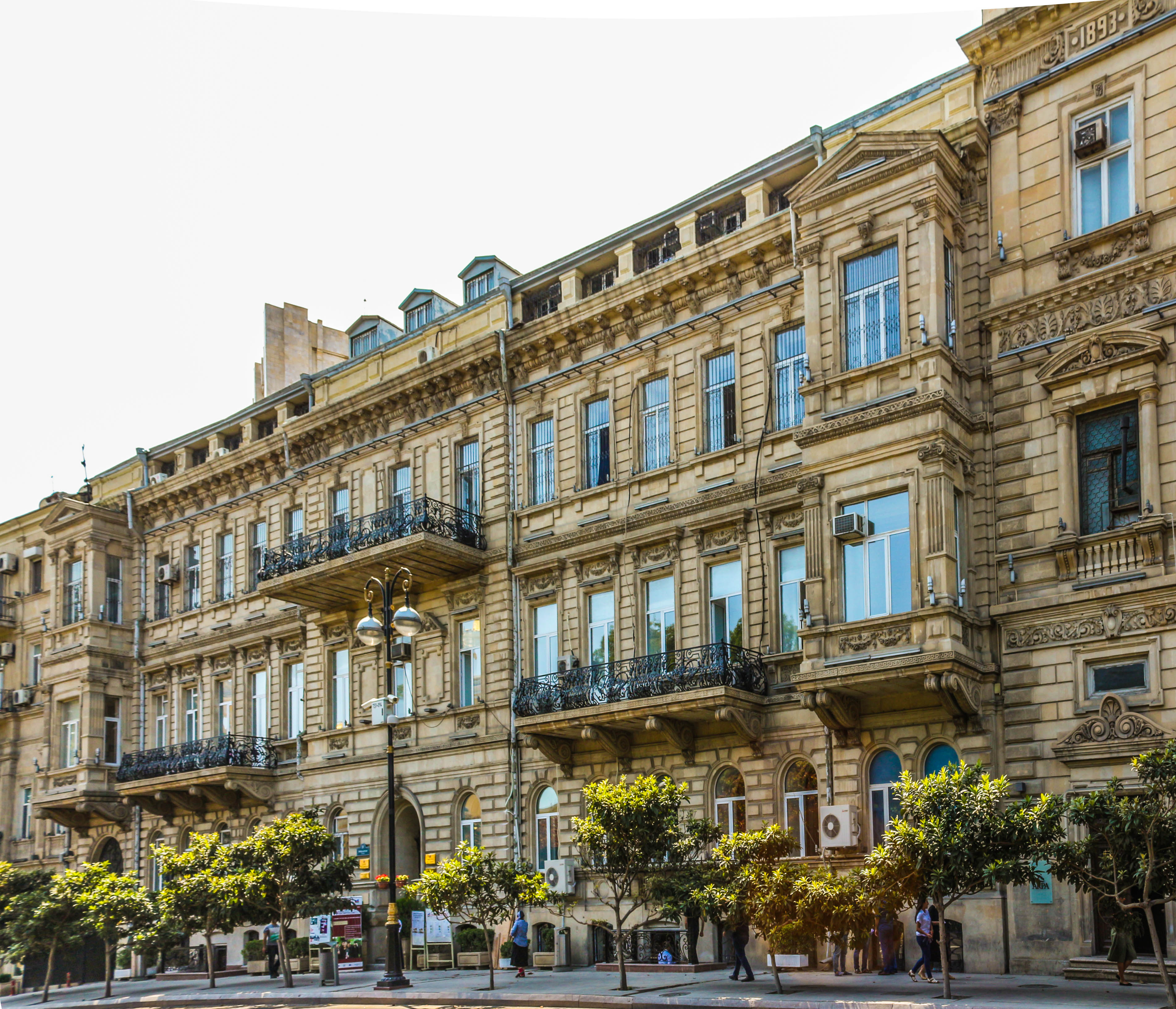
Townhouse at Istiglaliyyat Street 25

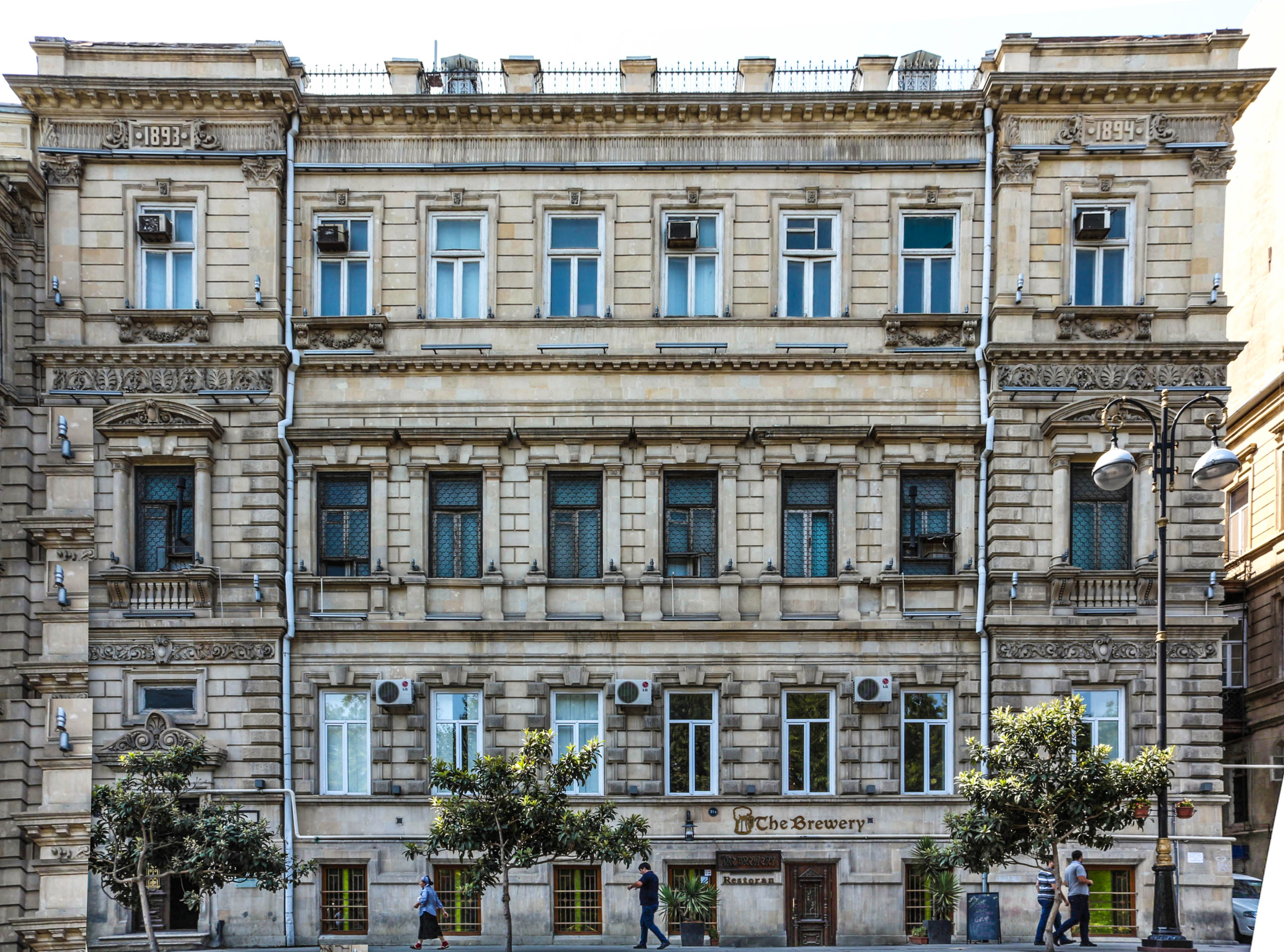
Townhouse at Istiglaliyyat Street 27

== See also ==
- History of Baku
