= Law on Copyright and Related Rights =

Law on Copyright and Related Rights is the name given to the copyright law in several countries:

- Copyright law of Azerbaijan
- Copyright law of the Russian Federation
- Copyright law of Ukraine
