= Intellectual Property Agency of Azerbaijan =

Intellectual Property Agency of the Republic of Azerbaijan
- Azərbaycan Respublikasının Əqli Mülkiyyət Agentliyi
- Coat of Arms of Azerbaijan

Agency overview
- Formed: September 10, 1993
- Headquarters: 40 U. Hajibeyov Street, Government House, 1st floor, Baku, Azerbaijan Republic AZ1000
- Agency executive: Kamran Imanov, Chairman of State Copyright Agency
- Website: www.copag.gov.az

The Intellectual Property Agency of the Republic of Azerbaijan (Azerbaijani: Azərbaycan Respublikasının Əqli Mülkiyyət Agentliyi) is a governmental agency within the Cabinet of Azerbaijan in charge of regulation of activities related to protection of copyrights and intellectual property in Azerbaijan Republic. The committee is headed by Kamran Imanov.

== History and structure ==
The Copyright Agency was established by the Presidential Decree on September 10, 1993. The main functions of the agency are creation of favorable legal conditions for potential people seeking to make contributions to scientific research in the country, literature and art; protection of copyright, related to the intellectual property and conducting state policy in field of the international cultural exchange; representation of Azerbaijan in international events, encouraging cooperation with similar agencies abroad; state registration of scientific, cultural and art works, etc. Azerbaijan enacted Law on Copyright and Related Rights in 1996.

Azerbaijan is a member of World Intellectual Property Organization (WIPO), a party to the Convention Establishing the World Intellectual Property Organization, the Paris Convention for Protection of Industrial Property, the Berne Convention for the Protection of Literary and Artistic Works, and the Geneva Phonograms Convention.

The agency was given the duty of protecting the folklore of Azerbaijan by President Ilham Aliyev.

In 2017 the head of agency stated that compared to 2005 figures, internet piracy level reduced from 61% to 29%.

All registered intellectual property can be found in the registry of the company. Nowadays 11.500 items were registered as intellectual property.

== See also ==
- Intellectual Property Law in Azerbaijan
- Cabinet of Azerbaijan
- List of Azerbaijan legislation
