= Azadliq Square, Baku =

Square in Baku, Azerbaijan

Azadliq Square
- The Government House on the square.
- Interactive map of Azadliq Square
- Native name: Azadlıq meydanı (Azerbaijani)
- Former name: Lenin Square
- Type: Public square
- Maintained by: Mayoralty of Baku
- Location: Baku, Azerbaijan
- Coordinates: 40°22′21″N 49°51′12″E

Construction
- Construction start: 1960–70s

Azadliq Square (Azerbaijani: Azadlıq meydanı), in Baku is the biggest city-center square in Azerbaijan. It lies next to Baku Boulevard.

== History ==
=== Soviet era ===
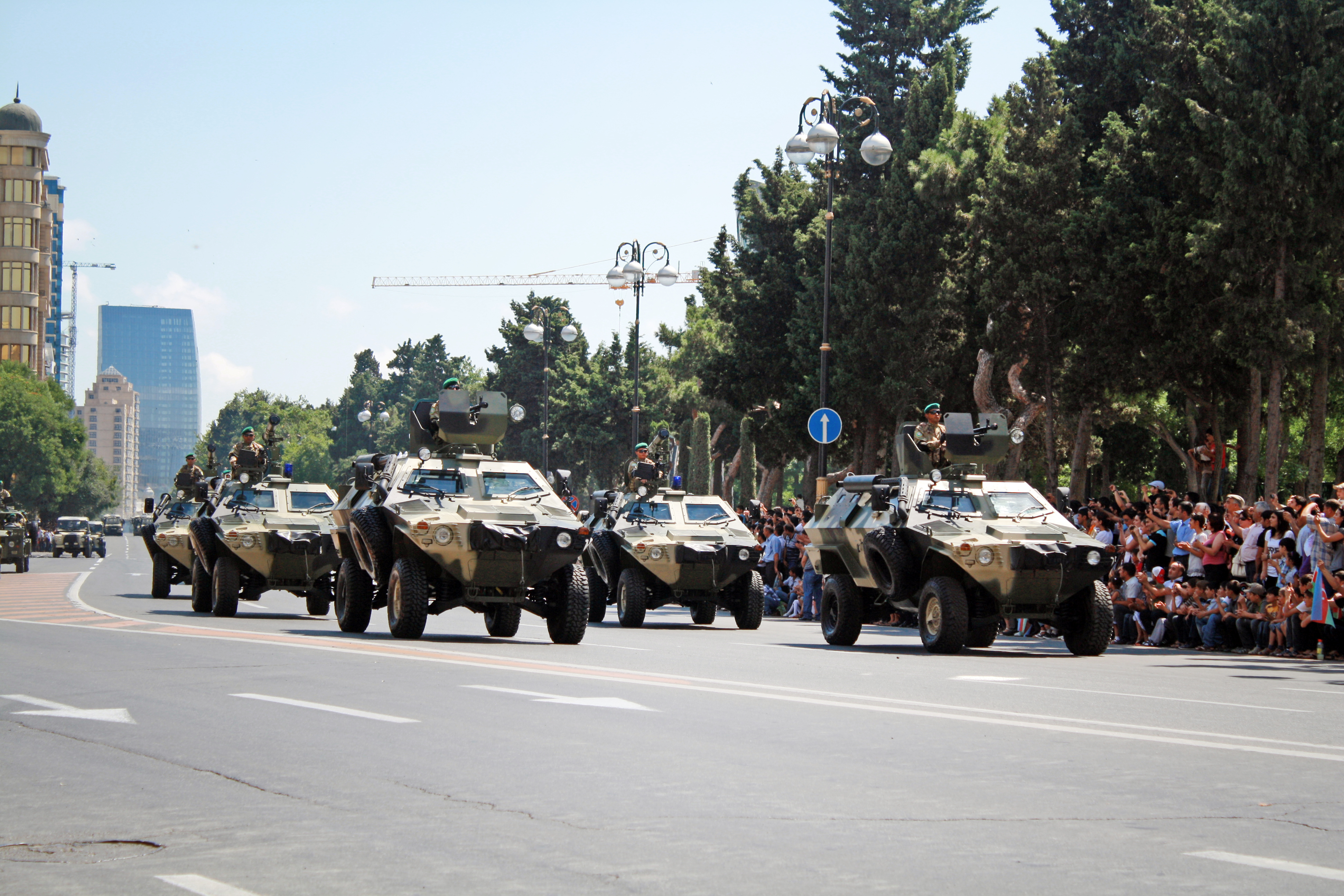
Armored vehicles on the square during a parade in 2011.

The square, formerly named Lenin Square after Vladimir Lenin, was created in the 1960s–70s, after construction of the Government House of Baku was finished in 1952. A monument to Lenin was erected in 1955. It was also formerly known as Stalin Square. On November 17, 1988, long-term rallies of 100,000 people began in the square. In Azerbaijan, these events are regarded as a national liberation movement and 17 November is celebratd as National Revival Day. For the first time, Lenin Square began to be called Freedom Square during the events of 1988.

=== Post-independence ===
On October 9, 1992, during the First Karabakh War, the first military parade of independent Azerbaijan took place on the square, marking Armed Forces Day.

Along with the square, Baku authorities constructed several buildings, including the "Azerbaijan" and "Absheron" hotels encircling the square, which were later demolished and replaced with the Hilton Baku and the JW Marriott Absheron Baku Hotel. The Lenin monument sculpted by D. M. Garyaghdi was removed in the early 1990s. The square was renamed Azadliq Square (Freedom Square) in 1991 after the collapse of the Soviet Union. In 2006, a government-sponsored project oversaw renovation works at Government House and its vicinity, including Azadliq Square. Works lasted until 2010.

== Buildings and structures ==
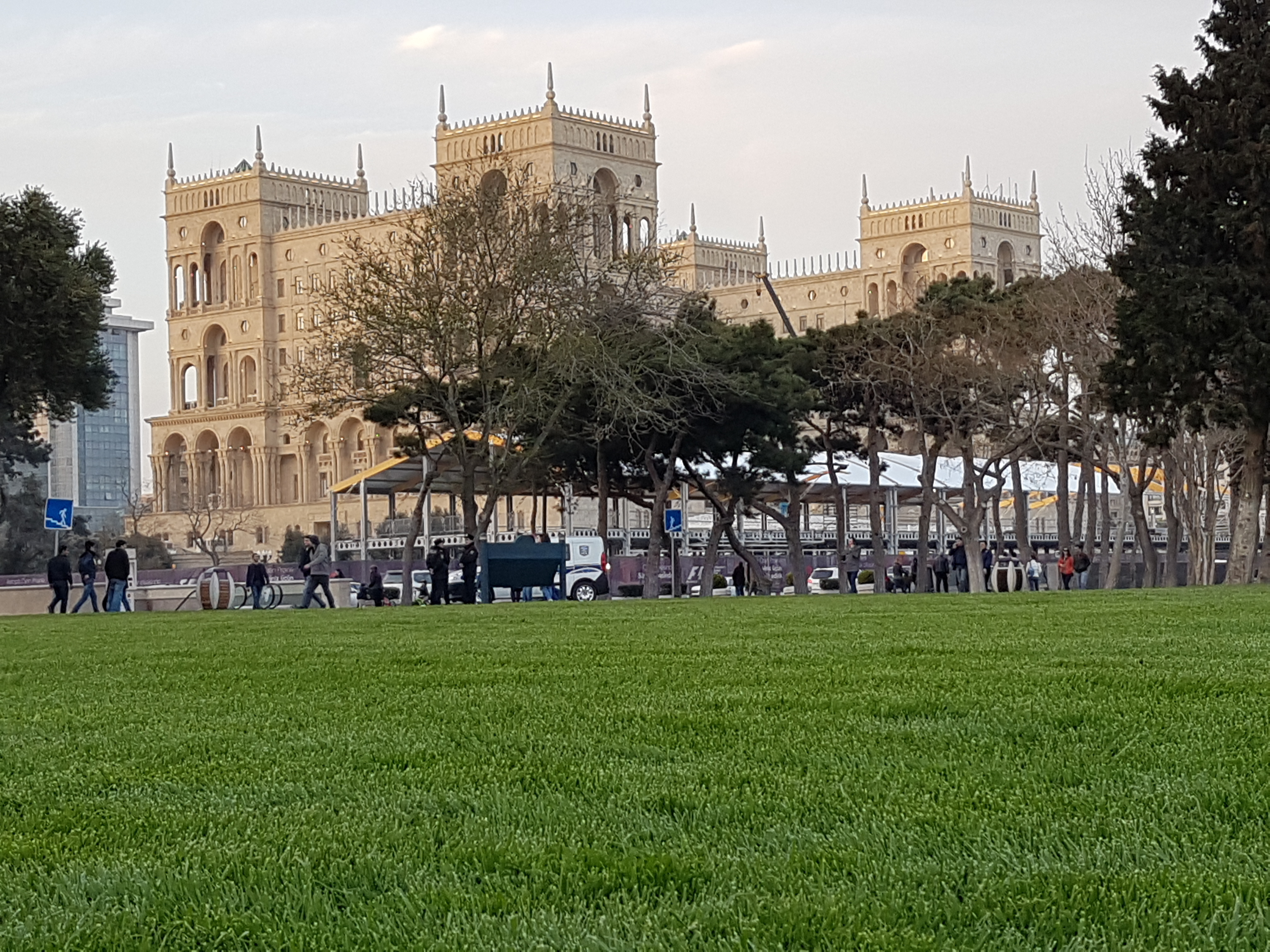
Government House - from panoramio

- Government House
- Baku Boulevard, across the Neftchiler Avenue
- Baku Maritime passenger terminal
- JW Marriott Absheron Baku Hotel
- Hilton Baku
- Park Bulvar Mall
- Radisson Hotel Baku
- Behind Government House, Baku Shopping Department Store
- The Crescent Hotel

=== Gallery ===
A parade on the square in 2013.

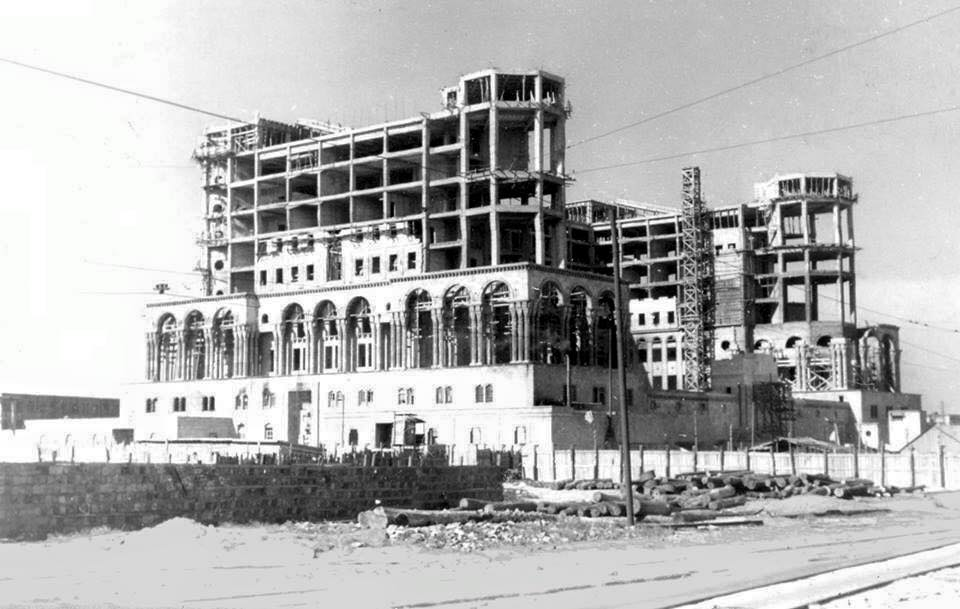
The construction of Government House in the 1930s.

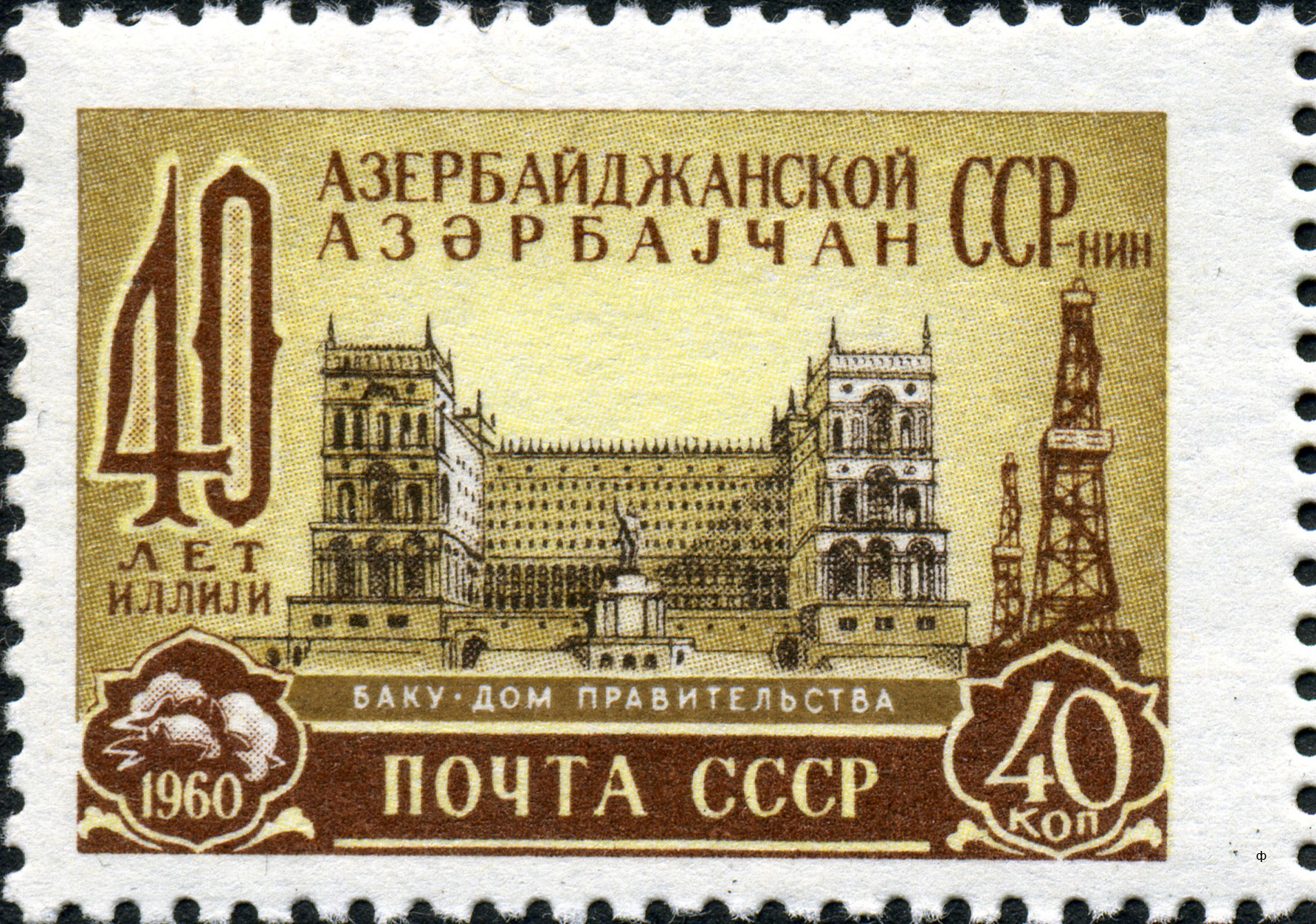
The building on a Soviet stamp on the 40th anniversary of Azerbaijan SSR

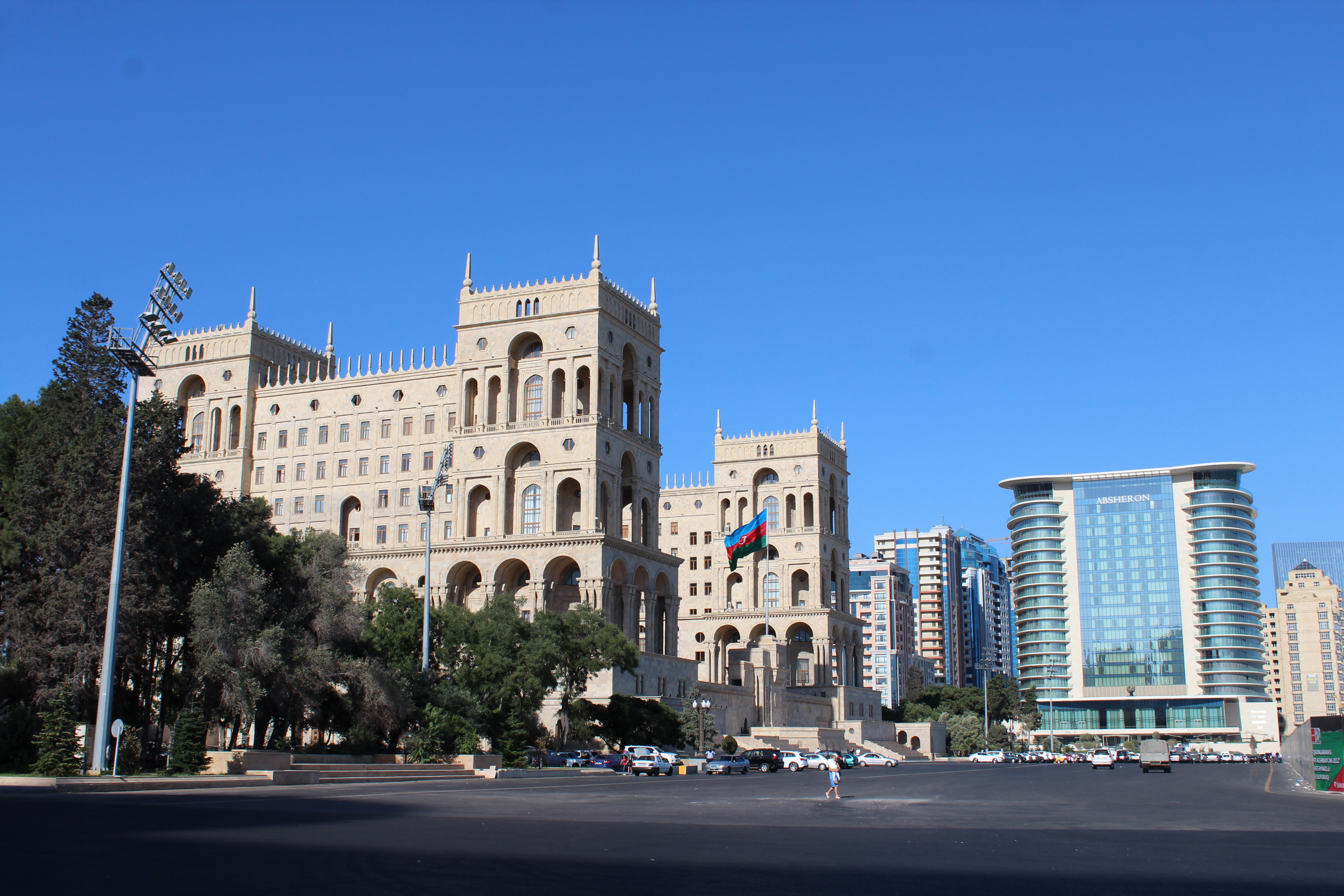

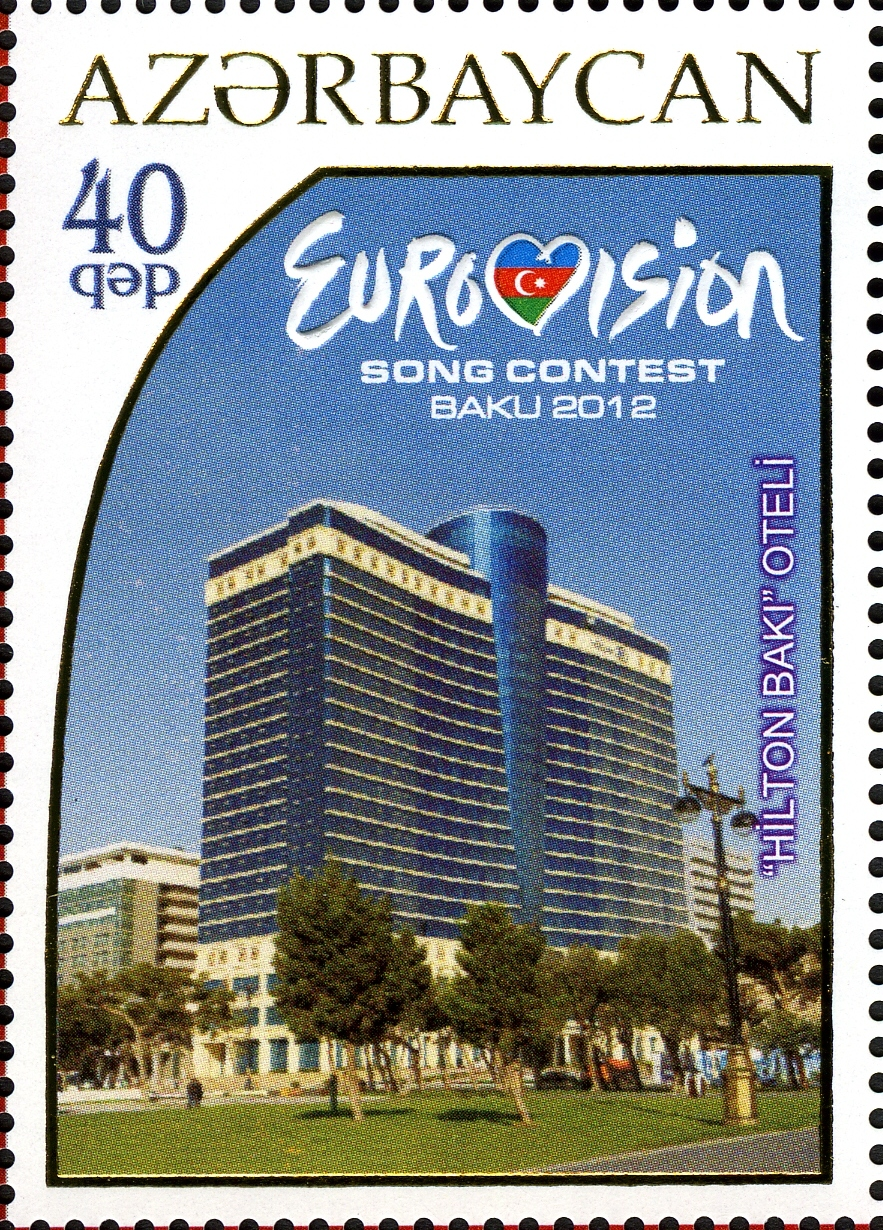
Baku Hilton Hotel

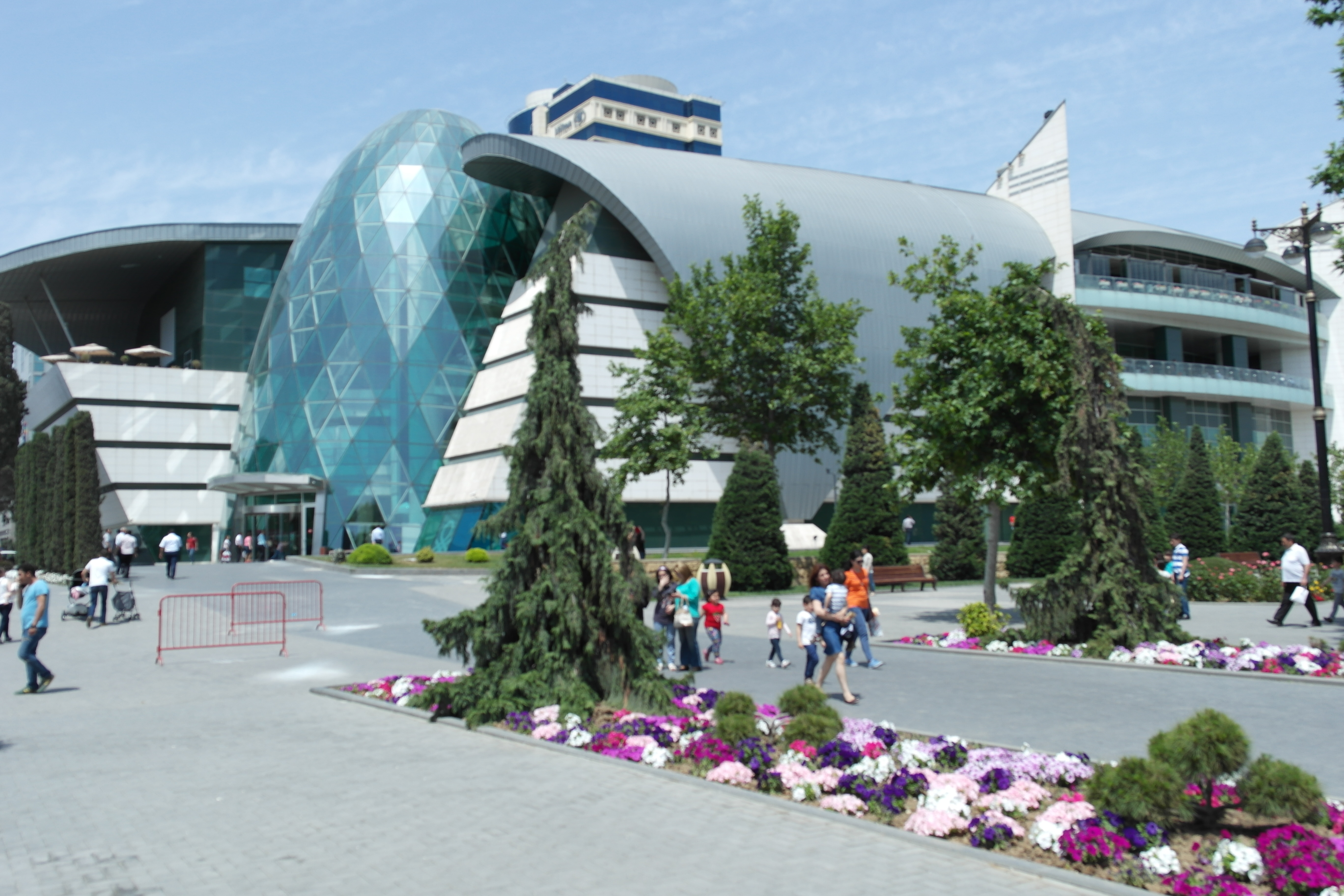
Park Bulvar Mall

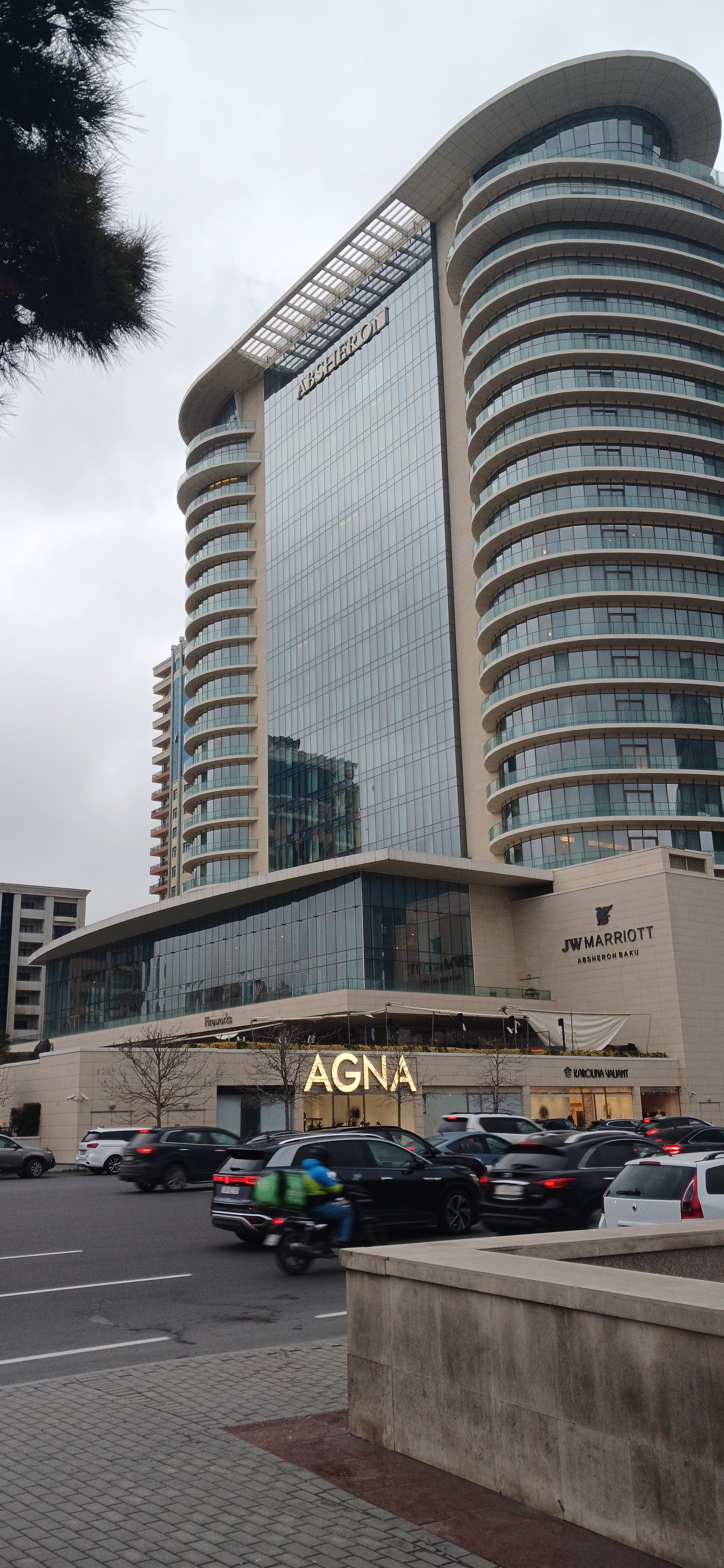
JW Marriott Absheron

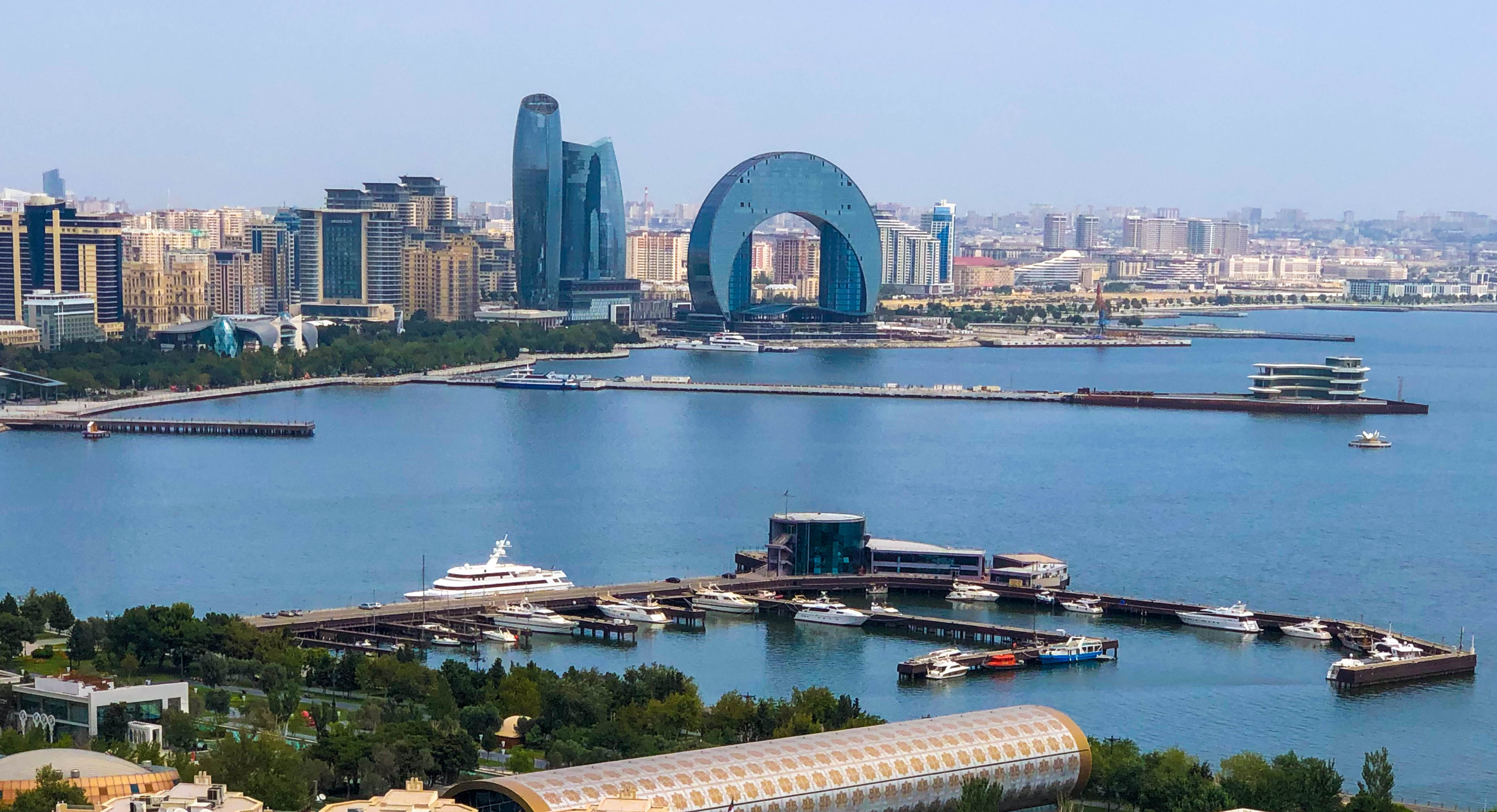
The Crescent Development project

== Events ==
=== Parades ===
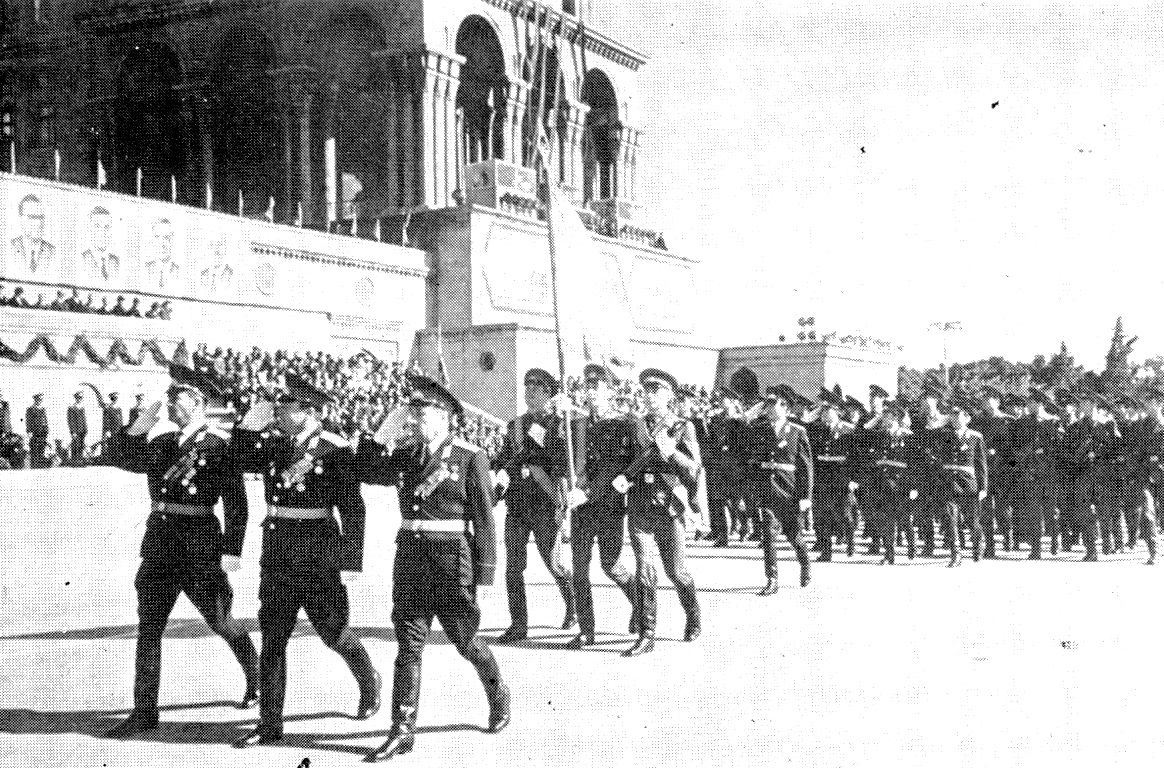
The Baku Higher Combined Arms Command School (BVOKU) marching on Lenin Square during a parade in Baku in October 1970.

During the Cold War, Lenin Square was used as a parade ground for the annual International Workers' Day demonstration on May 1, as well as the Victory Day and October Revolution Day military parades on May 9 and November 7 respectively. Azadliq Square is the main venue for the bi-annual Day of the Armed Forces military parade which takes place on June 26. In 2018, the square was used as the main venue for the centennial celebrations of the Battle of Baku, which was attended by Presidents Ilham Aliyev and Recep Tayyip Erdogan. On 10 December 2020, a victory parade took place on Azadliq Square, honouring the Azerbaijani victory during the 2020 Nagorno-Karabakh war, during which Armenian war trophies and Azerbaijani military vehicles, were displayed.

=== Demonstrations ===
Starting on 17 November 1988, large-scale demonstrations began in Baku's Lenin Square to protest against the alleged destruction of a forest near Shusha by Armenians. As the demonstrations continued, they became increasingly anti-Armenian, with chants of "death to the Armenians" and demands that those convicted of the murder of Armenians during the Sumgait pogrom be released. The demonstrations also developed into an anti-central government, anti-Soviet protest. On 23 November, a curfew was imposed in Baku and Soviet troops tried unsuccessfully to disperse the crowds. The events later led to the proclamation, in 1992, of National Revival Day of 17 November. Following the Black January crackdown by Soviet troops in Baku on 20 January 1990, Azadliq Square became the gathering and mourning place for approximately 2 million people who gathered to take the dead to a burial site in Martyrs' Lane in upper Baku.

Protests during the 2003 Azerbaijani protests took place on the square.

=== Other ===
In 1989 one of Azerbaijan's greatest vocalists, Yaqub Zourofchi, held a revolutionary concert as Azerbaijan was gaining their independence from USSR. The square was used for the Baku City Circuit.

== Transportation ==
=== Metro ===
The B6 Metro Station is planned in this area by Baku Metro in the future.

=== Tram ===
In February 2012, the government of Azerbaijan announced that it is planning to restore the tram line in Baku. A new line had to be laid along the seaside promenade of Baku Boulevard in central Baku as part of the Baku White City development project. Since then, Formula One made Alstom change the plans and the route of this tram line, which is never happened and project was not implemented yet.

== See also ==
- Black January
- Azerbaijani independence movement
- Mayoralty of Baku
- Neftchiler Avenue
