= Fenomen Cinematography Building =

- Azerbaijani: Fenomen sinematoqrafının binası Polish: Budynek Kinematografii Fenomen
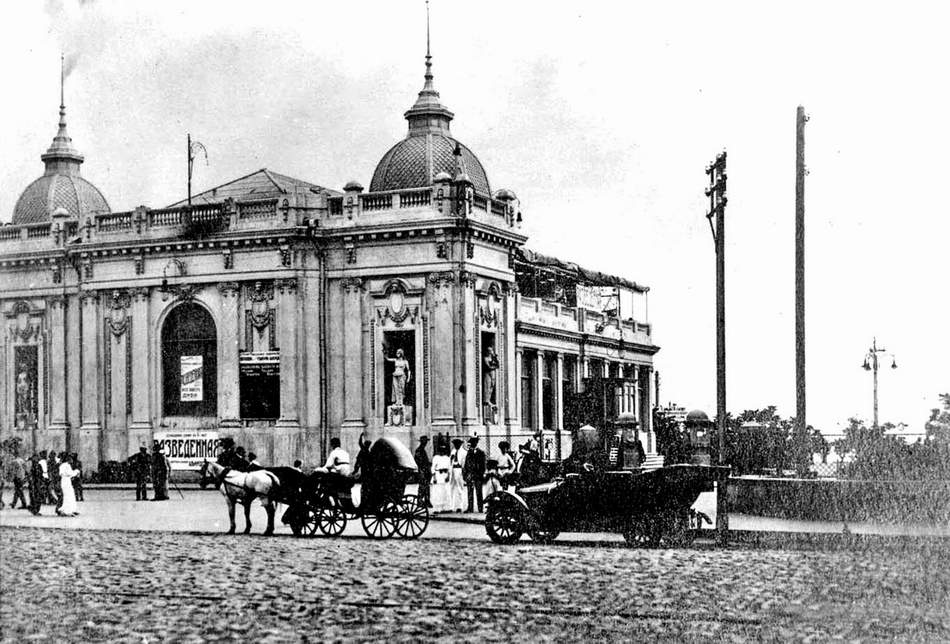
- Interactive map of the Fenomen Cinematography Building area

General information
- Architectural style: French Renaissance
- Location: Neftchilar Avenue 36, Sabail, Baku, Azerbaijan
- Coordinates: 40°22′1″N 49°50′21″E
- Construction started: 1909
- Completed: 1910

Design and construction
- Architect: Józef Płoszko

The Cinematography Building of Fenomen or the Puppet Theater is the first cinematographic building built in 1910 in Baku. The building was designed by Polish architect Józef Płoszko in the French Renaissance style. At present, the Azerbaijan State Puppet Theater operates in the building.

== History ==
In the early twentieth century, a new architectural theme - the construction of a silent cinema - was included in the planning and construction of theaters in Baku. Cheap cinema, which is open to everyone, soon gains the trust of the audience. The first building of cinematographers in Baku was built in 1909–1910 on the new boulevard according to the project of civil engineer Józef Płoszko. The construction of this building has caused a lot of discussion. After the project of the cinema was approved by the mayor, the construction of a new building began in 1909. However, the city authorities "stated that it is impossible to allow such a construction on the boulevard intended for walking and recreation. The pavilion will spoil the beauty of the boulevard and create congestion, so it should be demolished." The building was erected at the end of the boulevard, along with the warehouses of the Caucasus and Mercury Society, and in June 1910, the cinematographer began to operate under the name "Fenomen" and caused controversy. Despite the controversy over the impossibility of establishing such enterprises on the boulevard, the construction of a beautiful building as a cinematographer in the style of J. Płoszko, a talented architect in the style of the French Renaissance, created the idea that the Caucasus and Mercury society coexisted with ugly warehouses. The "Fenomen" was constructed when the new boulevard was not yet green. The boulevard, divided into flowerbeds and alleys, was not artistically interesting. Therefore, the architecture of the cinema looked more elegant. Fine-grained façades dominated the shoreline. Except for the warehouses of the "Caucasus and Mercury" Society, the building of "Fenomen” was free from the influence of the surrounding buildings and was in a more favorable position than other buildings in the city.

== Architectural features ==
The main façade, covered with large ionic plasters, standing on a high stylobate (base for columns) and completed with balustrade attic, looked very solemn and stunning on the shore. The two towers on the wings enlivened the silhouette of the overall building, continuing to some extent the traditional compositional methods for the architecture of all the city's buildings. This method served the individual architectural integrity of urban construction. The central part of the main façade protrudes slightly, pointing to the entrance portal led by a wide-open staircase with a semicircular arch. The splendor of the façade composition is further enhanced by the sculptures in the corner wall cavities. The synthesis of architecture and sculpture in Baku was demonstrated in the creative works of J. Płoszko. Płoszko later returned to this topic several times, but the work was limited to a laconic solution without the active participation of sculpture in the architectural composition of the building. The façades of Fenomen's gallery, designed for spectators, are also beautifully designed in the classical style, but the small order does not correspond to the large order of the main façade, which leads to the mismatch of the scale of the central and side parts. The creation of glazed galleries and the location of the restaurant there undoubtedly violated the solemn monumental character of the building and weakened its architectural harmony. During the opening of the cinema, the administration widely advertised the technical and architectural merits of the new cinema on the boulevard, saying that the hall is spacious and elegant, changing air every 15 minutes, using the latest ventilation system and a special ozanator; Suction ventilation, which is considered harmful, has been replaced by a lever, and air is introduced into the hall through ozanators, cooling ducts and filters.

== Further Use of the Building ==
The building of Fenomen has been used in cinemas, casinos, etc. for 10 years was used as. In 1921, according to the project of civil engineer Ziver bey Ahmadbeyov, it underwent a major reconstruction and became the "Satiragit" workers' theater. Later, until 1932, the Baku Turkish Workers' Theater and the Musical Comedy Theater operated here. In 1941–1945, the "Mudafia" cinema operated here, and after the war, the Azerbaijan Agricultural Museum. After the establishment of the Agricultural Museum, 4 statues in front of the building (Mercury, Bacchus, Poseidon and Aphrodite), erected by Płoszko, were removed and replaced by a statue of a shepherd and a milkman. The Azerbaijan State Puppet Theater has been operating in the building since 1970. When the building was renovated in the 1980s, the statues were restored. However, after a major overhaul in 2007, the statues in front of the building were removed in 1910.

== Photos ==
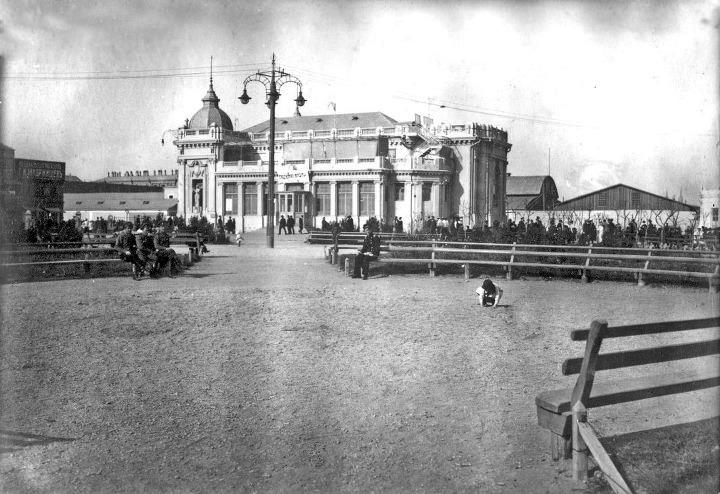

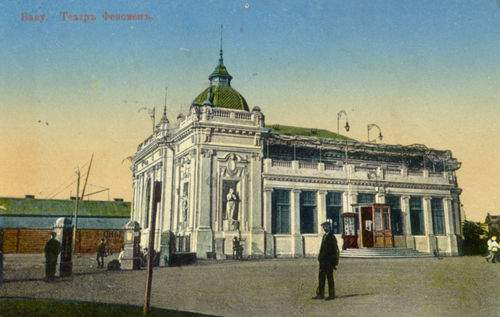

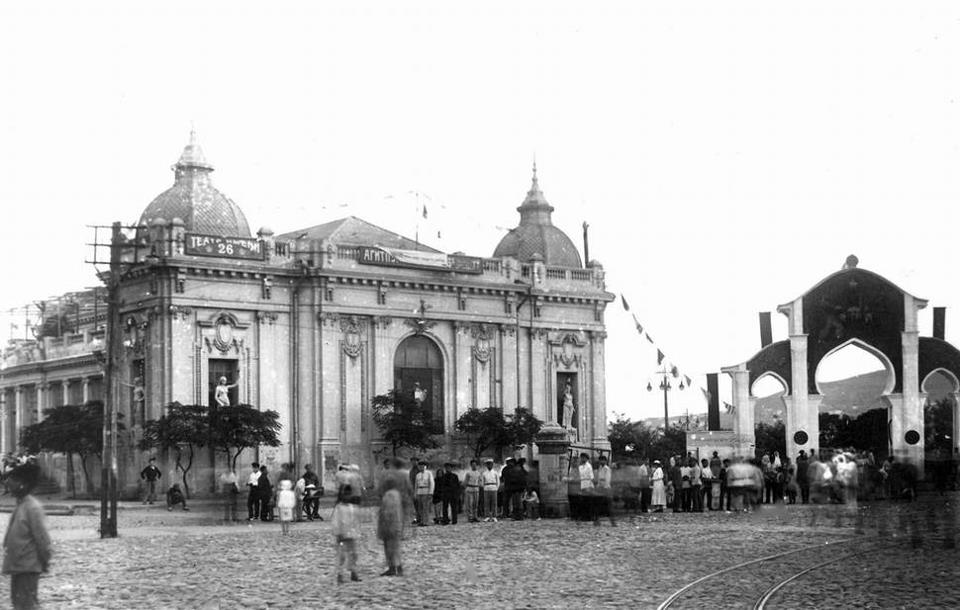

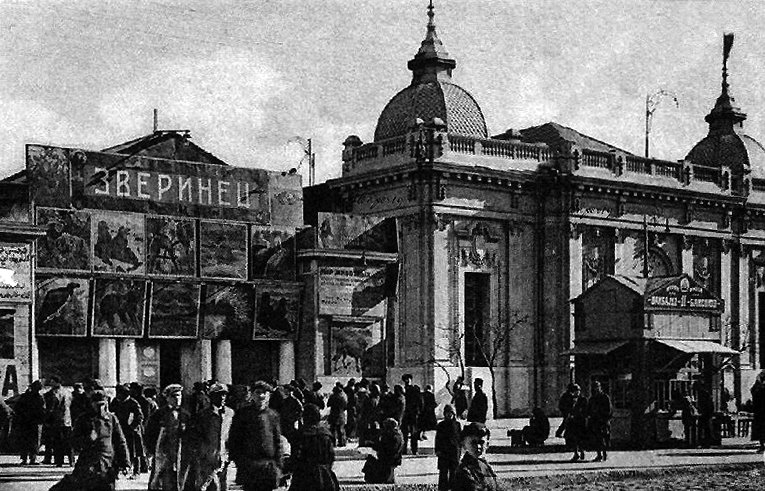

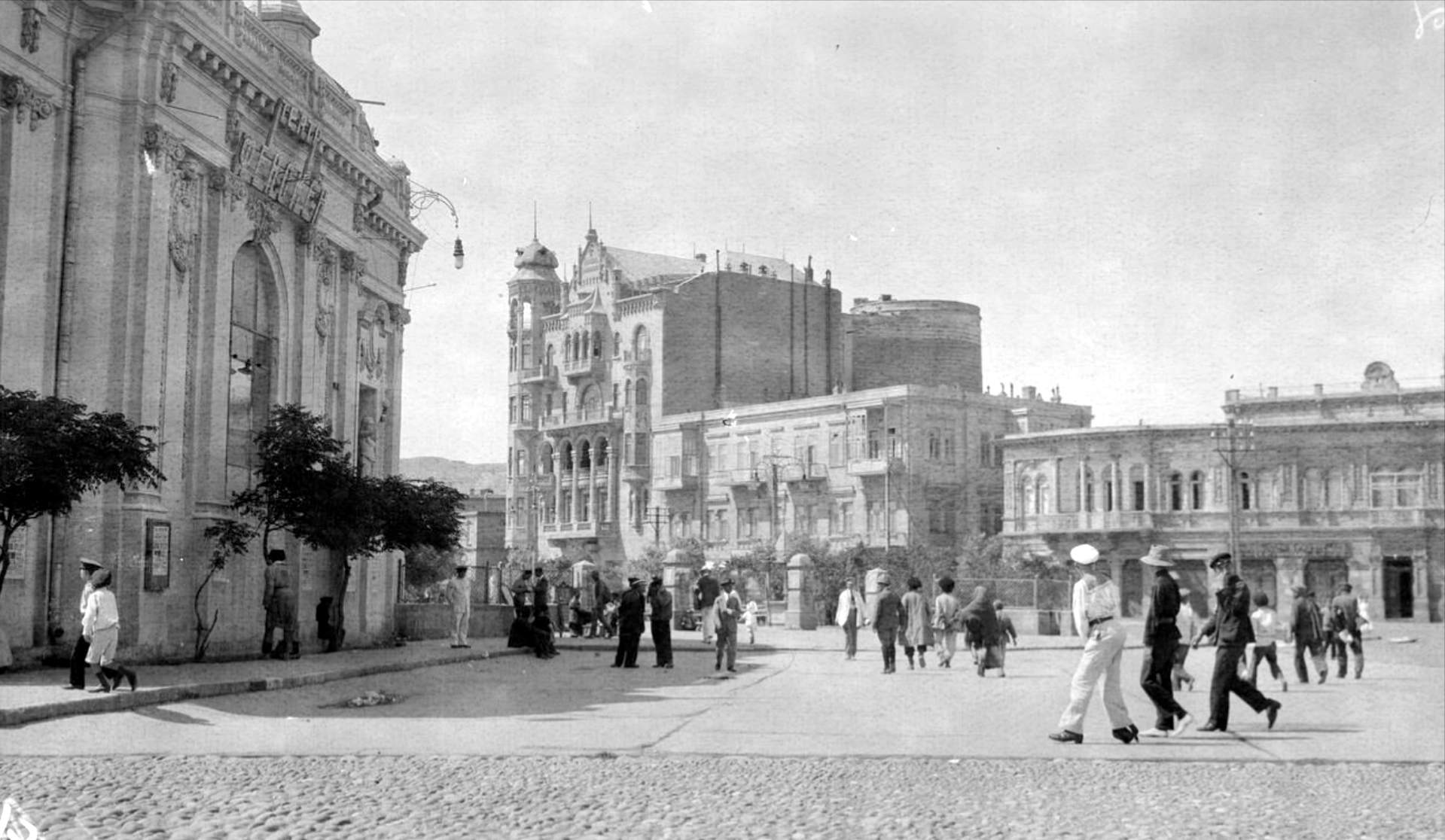

== See also ==
- Ismailiyya Palace
- Mitrofanov Residence
- Mikado Cinematography building
