= Isgandar =

Isgandar is a given name. Notable people with the name include:

- Isgandar Chandirli, Azerbaijani politician
- Isgandar Hamidov (1948–2020), Azerbaijani politician
- Isgandar Javadov (born 1956), Azerbaijani footballer
- Isgandar Khan Khoyski (1819–1894), Russian and Azerbaijani military commander
