= Isgandar Chandirli =

Azerbaijani politician

Isgandar Chandirli İskəndər Çəndirli

Director of State Procurement Agency of Azerbaijan Republic
- In office November 19, 2008 – January 15, 2016
- President: Ilham Aliyev

Isgandar Chandirli Huseyn oglu (Azerbaijani: İsgəndər Çəndirli Hüseyn oğlu) is an Azerbaijani politician, Ex-director of State Procurement Agency of Azerbaijan Republic.

He was appointed the Director of the State Procurement Agency in the November 19, 2008 reshuffle of the Cabinet of Ministers of Azerbaijan. He has been a proponent of switching to full electronic bidding in purchase and sale transactions of the government.

== See also ==
- Cabinet of Azerbaijan
