= Baku Puppet Theatre =

State puppet theatre in Baku, Azerbaijan

- "Phenomenon", "Satyragite"
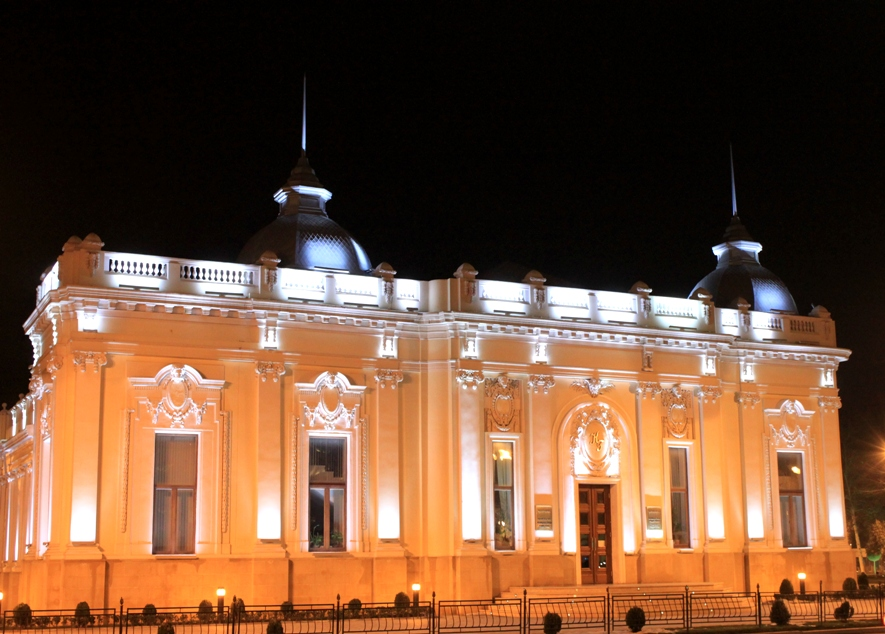
- Interactive map of Baku Puppet Theatre
- Address: Neftchilar Avenue, 36; Baku; Azerbaijan
- Coordinates: 40°22′2.04″N 49°50′21.17″E
- Capacity: 210 seats
- Type: Puppet theatre
- Public transit: M 1 Sahil metro station

Construction
- Opened: June 1910
- Rebuilt: 1921
- Years active: Since 1931
- Architect: Józef Płoszko

The Baku Puppet Theatre (Polish: Bakiński Teatr Lalek; formally Azerbaijan State Puppet Theatre named after Abdulla Shaig, Azerbaijani: Abdulla Şaiq adına Azərbaycan Dövlət Kukla Teatrı) is a puppet theatre located on Neftchiler Avenue of Baku. It was built in eclectic style in 1910 by Polish architect Józef Płoszko, initially as the "Phenomenon" movie theatre.

The puppets vary in size from a few centimetres to double the size of a human.

== Overview ==
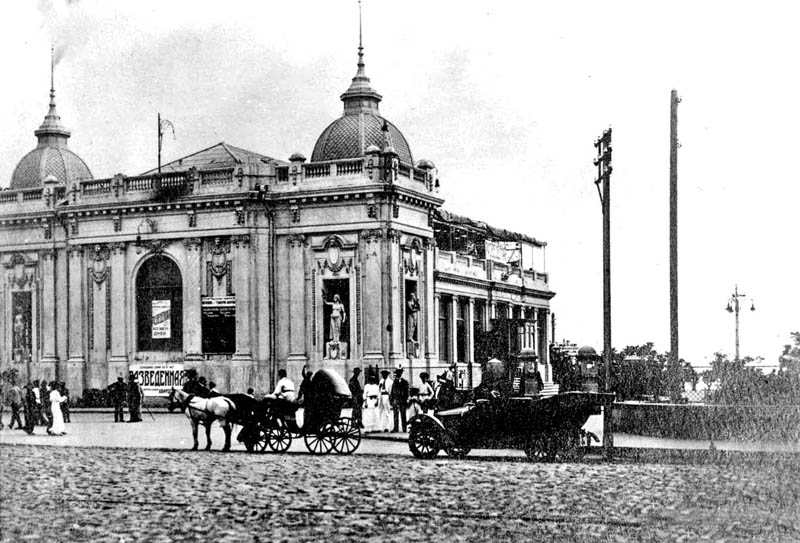
The building in 1910, when it was the Fenomen Cinematography Building.

The theatre building was erected at the Baku Boulevard when there was no greenery yet. The exhaust ventilation system was superseded by forced ventilation. When the movie theater was opened to the public in June 1910, its administration advertised the features of full ventilation, occurring every 15 minutes and a special ozonator.

The auditorium hall of the movie theatre was 24 m. in length, 11 m. in width, 10 m. in height. 400 seats were available in the parterre. Additionally, there were 7 loges, and in the upper section, 3 verandas.

== History ==
=== History of the building ===
The first owner of “Phenomenon” cinema was M. Gofman. It was planning to rent the cinema hall for spectacles. Entrepreneurs were arranging permission from city authorities to enlarge the building in the future. As a result, the architectural appearance of the building was completed by the monuments of 4 ancient mythological figures – Mercury, Bacchus, Poseidon and Aphrodite.

In 1921, according to the project of Azerbaijani architect Zivar bey Ahmadbeyov, the building was cardinally rebuilt for the theatre "Satyragite".

“Phenomenon” operated as a cinema, casino, "Satyrogite Theatre", "Musical Comedy Theatre" and as the "Museum of Agricultural Achievements" until 1931.

=== History of the Puppet Theatre ===
The idea to establish a puppet theatre, was introduced by the theatre actor Molla Agha Babirli. On the initiative of theatre activists led by Jafar Jabbarly, the puppet theatre was founded in 1931 by the decision of the Education Commission of the Azerbaijan SSR. The first play performed at the theatre was "Circus" in 1932. The puppet theatre operated independently in 1931–1941, and in 1946–1950, under the Azerbaijan State Theatre of Young Spectators in 1941–1946 and under the Azerbaijan State Philharmonic Hall in 1950. In 1964, "State" status was given to the theatre.

Since 1975, plays for adult audiences have been performed as well.

== See also ==
- Baku Boulevard
- Ganja Puppet Theatre
- Fenomen Cinematography Building
