= List of Azerbaijan legislation =

This is an incomplete list of Azerbaijan legislation, in chronological order.

- 1996 - Law on Copyright and Related Rights (Law No. 438, 05.06.1996)
- 1997 - Law on Patents
- 1998 - Law on Trademarks and Geographic Names
- 1998 - Law on Information, Informatization, and Information Protection (03.04.1998)
- 1998 - Law on Citizenship (30.09.1998)
- 2005 - Freedom of Information Act
