= JW Marriott Absheron Baku Hotel =

Hotel in Baku, Azerbaijan

JW Marriott Absheron Baku

- Location within Azerbaijan

General information
- Location: Baku, Azerbaijan
- Coordinates: 40°22′27″N 49°51′23″E
- Opening: 1 May 2012

Technical details
- Floor count: 23

Other information
- Number of rooms: 237

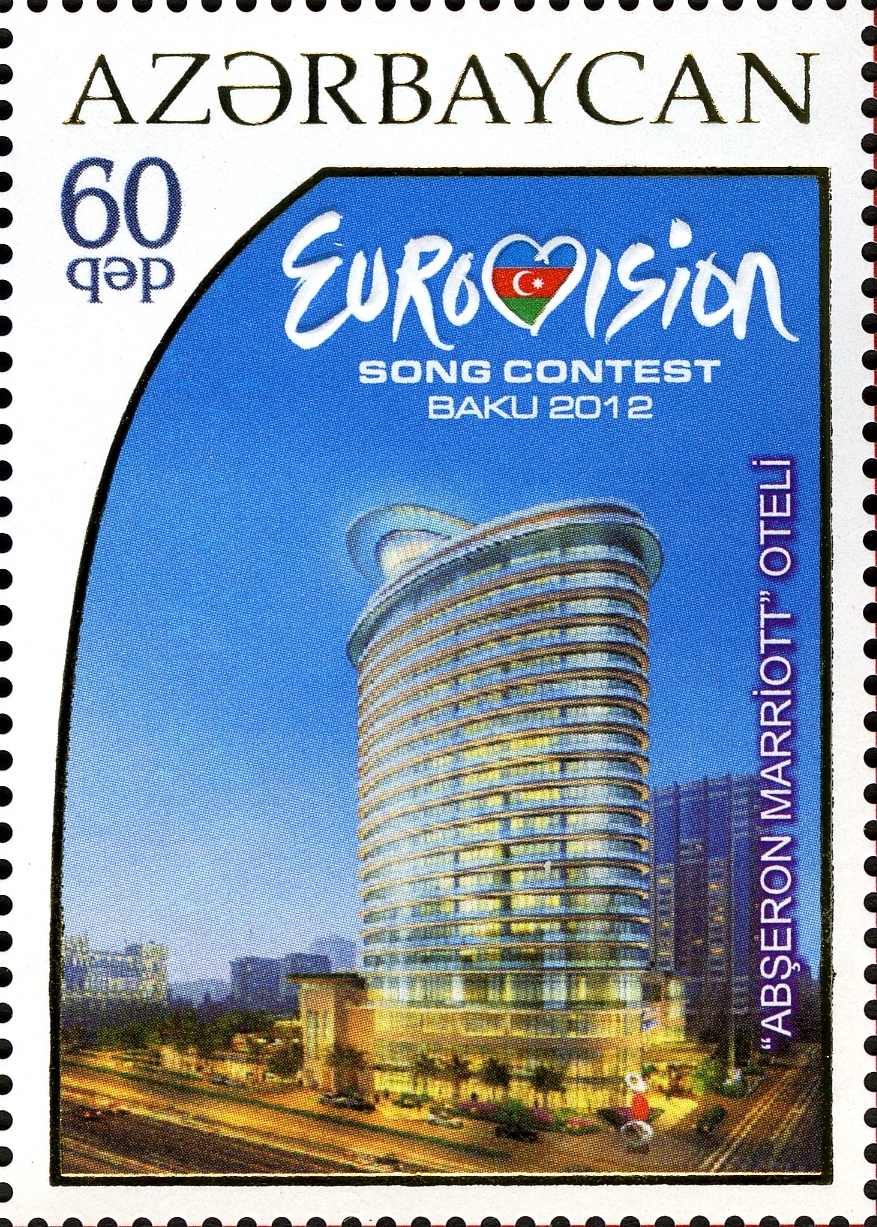
JW Marriott Absheron Hotel on stamp

The JW Marriott Absheron Baku is a high-rise hotel in Baku, Azerbaijan, opened in 2012. It is located on Azadliq Square next to Pushkin's Park and the Crescent Hotel on the edge of the Caspian Sea.

The hotel is named for the previous Absheron Hotel which formerly stood on this site. It was established by the Soviet Intourist monopoly in 1985 and had 343 rooms on 16 floors. It was entirely demolished in 2009.

The current JW Marriott-managed hotel of 237 rooms on 21 floors was built on the site and opened on July 3, 2012. It was described by author Ken Haley as an "imposing" hotel, with some rooms that have a "magnificent view of the city square and the sun-spangled expanse of the world's largest lake".
