= Government House, Baku =

Azerbaijani government building in Baku

Government House
- Azerbaijani: Hökumət evi
- Interactive map of the Government House area
- Former names: Domsovet

General information
- Architectural style: Baroque
- Location: Baku, Sabail Raion, Azadliq Square, Azerbaijan
- Coordinates: 40°22′25″N 49°51′9″E
- Construction started: 1936
- Completed: 1952; 74 years ago
- Owner: Azerbaijani government

Design and construction
- Architects: Lev Rudnev, V.O. Munts

The Government House of Baku, also known as the House of Government, is a government building housing various state ministries of Azerbaijan. It is located on Neftchiler Avenue and faces the Baku Boulevard, while the rear of the building faces the busy Uzeyir Hajibeyov Street in central Baku. Government House was designed for 5,500 people.

== History of the building ==
From 1924 to 1927, the construction of several large government buildings was planned and included in the budget of Baku. In 1934, the Soviet authorities announced a tender for the construction of the Baku Soviet Palace (later renamed the Government House). The competition was won by well-known architects Lev Rudnev, Vladimir Munts and K. Tkachenko (participant). With some alterations to the project, the building of the Government House was built between 1936 and 1952.

The construction of the building also led to the construction of Lenin Square (later renamed Azadliq Square) in front of the Government House. In 1955, a monument to Vladimir Lenin facing Azadliq Square sculpted by Jalal Garyaghdi was installed in front of the building. In addition to this, a large complex of buildings around the Government House was built in the 1960s–1970s, which included the hotels "Azerbaijan" and "Absheron", 16-story buildings on Uzeyir Hajibeyov street, and the Azərpoçt headquarters.

Lenin's statue was later removed during the Azerbaijani independence movement in the aftermath of bloody Black January. An Azerbaijani flag now stands where Lenin's statue stood. Lenin Square was renamed Azadliq Square (Freedom Square).

== After independence ==
The building housed many organizations and business firms after the restoration of Azerbaijani independence in 1991. After the complete renovation of the building, all business firms were moved to other locations in the city, and the offices were provided to governmental organizations. Among them, the State Committee for Ecology and Environmental Protection, Ministry of Agriculture and Produce, State Committee for Geology and Mineral Resources, State Committee for Hydrometeorology, State Committee for Material Resources, and the State Committee for Improvements of Soil and Water Economy.

In 2006, the government of Azerbaijan started renovation work on the building and completed the project in 2010. 40.8 million Azerbaijani manats were spent on reconstruction and enrichment of the park surrounding the building. Being in the center of Baku, the Government House is among the most visited tourist attractions of Azerbaijan. Currently, several ministries including the Ministry of Culture and Tourism, Ministry of Agriculture, Ministry of Labor and Social Protection of Population, State Procurement Agency and the Copyright Agency of the republic occupy the building offices.

== Picture gallery ==
Government House of Baku

Government House at night

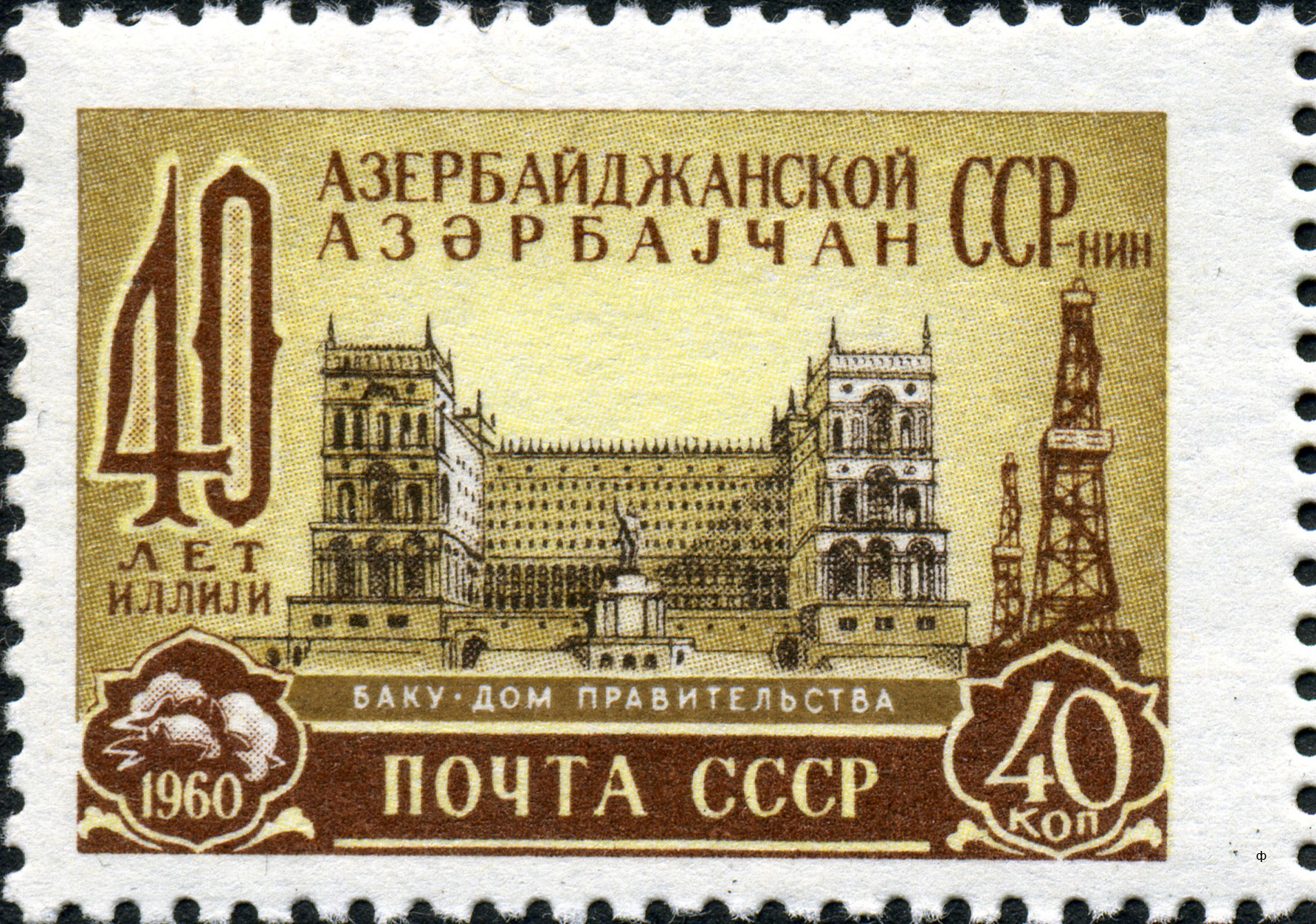
The building on a Soviet stamp 40th anniversary of Azerbaijan SSR

== See also ==
- Mayoralty of Baku
