= Topkhana Forest =

Forest in Shusha

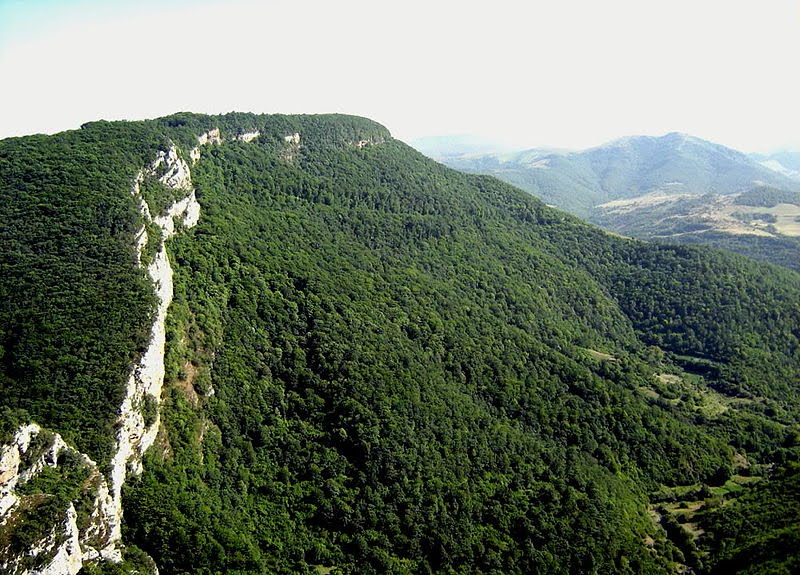
Topkhana Forest

The Topkhana Forest (Armenian: տոփխանա անտառ; Azerbaijani: Topxana meşəsi) is a forest and a state reserve located near Shusha, Azerbaijan. Claims of its destruction in 1988 caused tensions over the political future of Nagorno-Karabakh and encouraged civil and inter-ethnic unrest that would eventually erupt into the first Nagorno-Karabakh War.

== History ==
Topkhana is the name of a gently-sloping hillside opposite (and visible from) the town of Shusha, but separated from the town by deep gorge containing the Karkar (also known as the Dashalty) river. Its name derives from it being the location of cannons of Mohammad Khan Qajar during his siege of Shusha in 1795. The forest was mentioned in Anar Rzayev's novel The Last Night of the Expiring Year first published in 1970. Yevgeni Kotlyarov, USSR Master of Sports and specialist on athletic tourism, mentioned "forested slopes of the Topkhana plateau in Shusha" in his 1978 publication on mountain tourism in Karabakh. In his book of critical reviews of Soviet literature, published in 1985, writer Elchin Afandiyev, who spent his younger years in Shusha, mentioned "staring into the dark blue depth of the mighty Topkhana forest" as a youth and "dreaming of having [his] first novel published". In early November 1988, the site was described by Galina Starovoitova as home to "just one rather spindly tree and some scrubby bushes".

== Claims of destruction ==
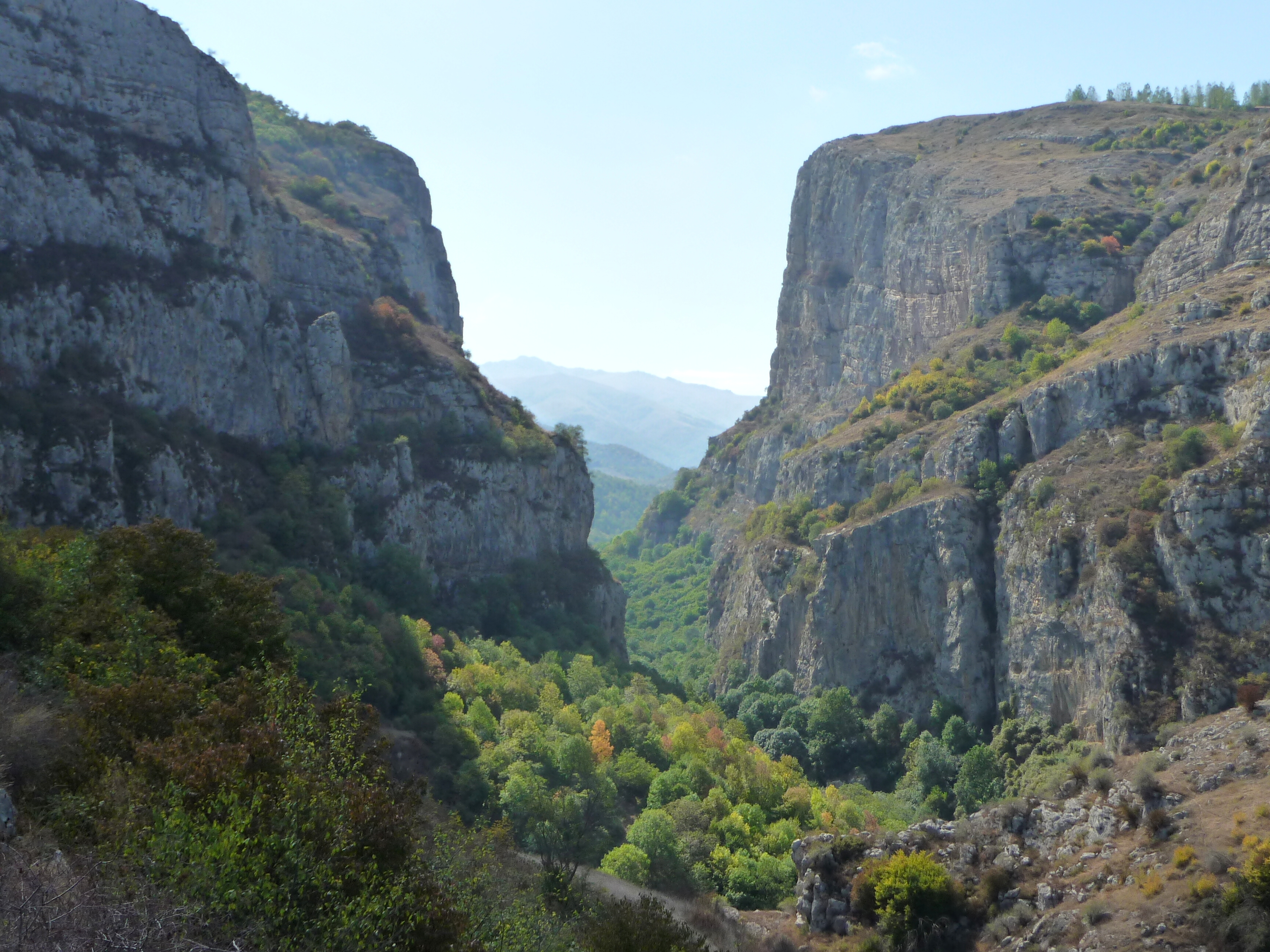
Dashalty Gorge

In October 1988 Abdurrahman Vazirov, the First Secretary of the Communist Party of Azerbaijan, announced in a speech that a bridge should be constructed across the Hunot Gorge in order to expand the town of Shusha onto the opposite bank and link it to the surrounding countryside. Shusha was predominantly Azerbaijani-populated, but the opposite bank was inhabited exclusively by Armenians, who considered this was an attempt to expand Azerbaijani-inhabited territory in Nagorno-Karabakh at the expense of its Armenian population. The Karabakh Committee decided a symbolic Armenian-held structure should be erected on that opposite bank, and on 5 November consulted with the Central Committee of the Communist Party of Armenia, who, in return for an assurance that the upcoming October Revolution parade in Yerevan would not be disrupted, agreed to send trucks loaded with building materials for the construction. The trucks and materials arrived in Shusha on 7 November. This (in the Gregorian calendar) was the anniversary of the October 1917 revolution – but Shusha had been placed under curfew and the usual Communist parades and ceremonies had been cancelled.

In some sources the proposed structure is described as a workshop, in most it is described as a recreational facility for workers at Yerevan's Kanaker aluminium factory.

On 9 November 1988 construction work began at Topkhana on a vacation resort for workers at Yerevan's Kanaker aluminium factory. Permission for the work had been granted by the civic authorities of nearby Askeran, who had designated 15 acres of land for the project.

The halting of the construction was accompanied by an "atmosphere of hysteria" erupting in Baku, fed by inaccurate information printed in local Baku newspapers, none of which had actually sent a reporter to Shusha. Nationalists had taken control of the Azerbaijani press, publishing stories that a "sacred grove" had been destroyed by Armenians who were going to build an aluminium plant. The aim was to stir up popular pro-Azerbaijani and anti-Armenian sentiments. An editorial in Bakinskiy Rabochiy (Baku Worker) called the construction a "branch of the Kanakerskiy Aluminum Plant", the location the "Topkhan Natural History Museum of living nature", and asserted that for Azerbaijanis, Topkhana was "the final drop that made the cup of patience overflow". Azerbaijan radio claimed that Topkhane was a "historical natural monument" and the site of an Azerbaijani fortress. The result was an organized Azerbaijani popular movement emerging for the first time in the growing Nagorno-Karabagh crisis and, starting on 17 November, large-scale demonstrations began in Baku's Lenin Square to protest against the supposed destruction at Topkhana. The 17 November event is now commemorated as a national holiday in Azerbaijan, known as "National Revival Day".

Azerbaijani sources still maintain that the Baku reports of November 1988 about Topkhana are true, describing the forest as "a true miracle of nature", claiming "here lived plants, bears, wolves, wild boars, foxes, hares, deer, quail, pigeons, a variety of other animals and birds. Along the forest stretched sub-alpine and alpine meadows, deep gorges and springs dazzled the imagination. It is estimated that more than 2,000 oak trees and other rare species of trees have been felled at Topkhana and transported to Armenia. Its rich flora and fauna continue to be destroyed."

== Gallery ==
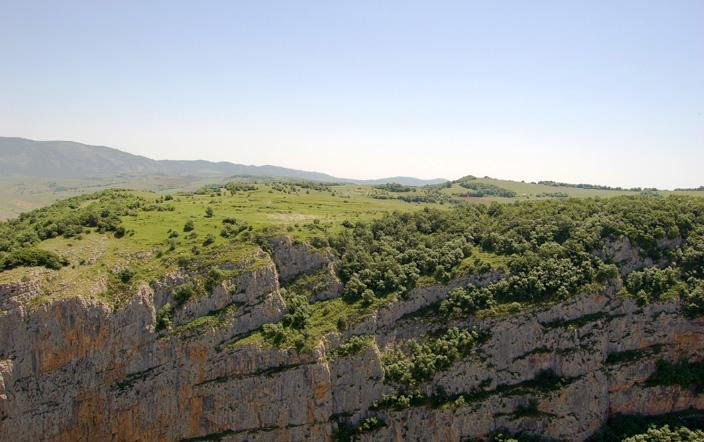

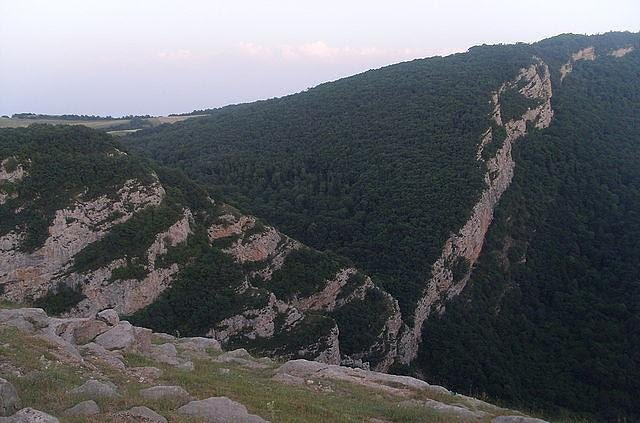

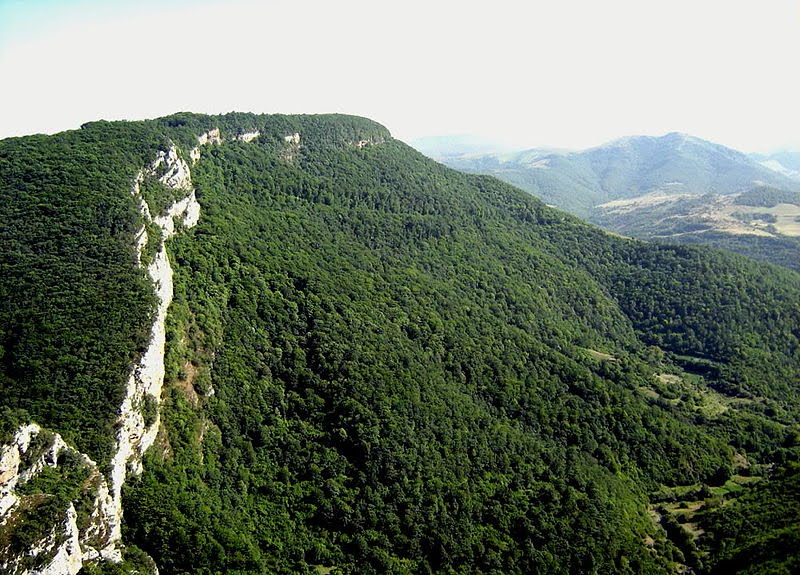

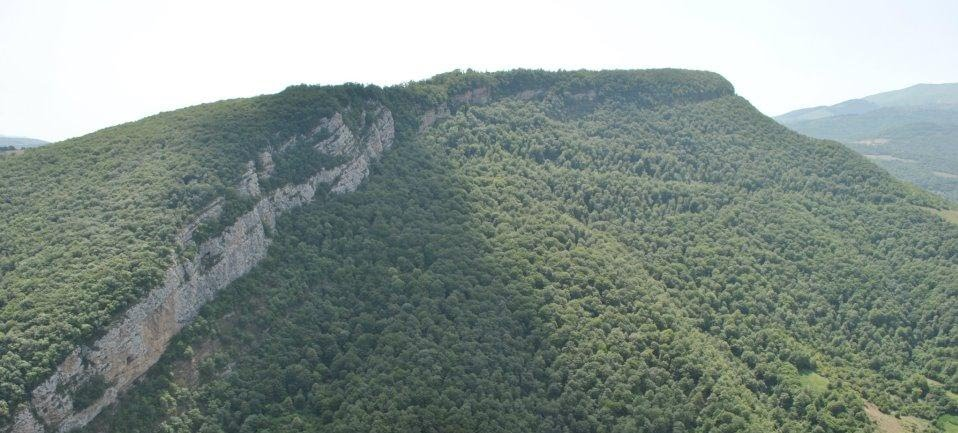
