= Intellectual property law in Azerbaijan =

The Constitution of Azerbaijan generally recognizes the right to intellectual property (IP), and ensures the protection of IP rights of all persons. In order to clarify the norm of Constitution, and establish the legal basis of the protection of intellectual property rights, the parliament of Azerbaijan approved some laws, and ratified international agreements.

== World Intellectual Property Organization and its ratified Conventions ==
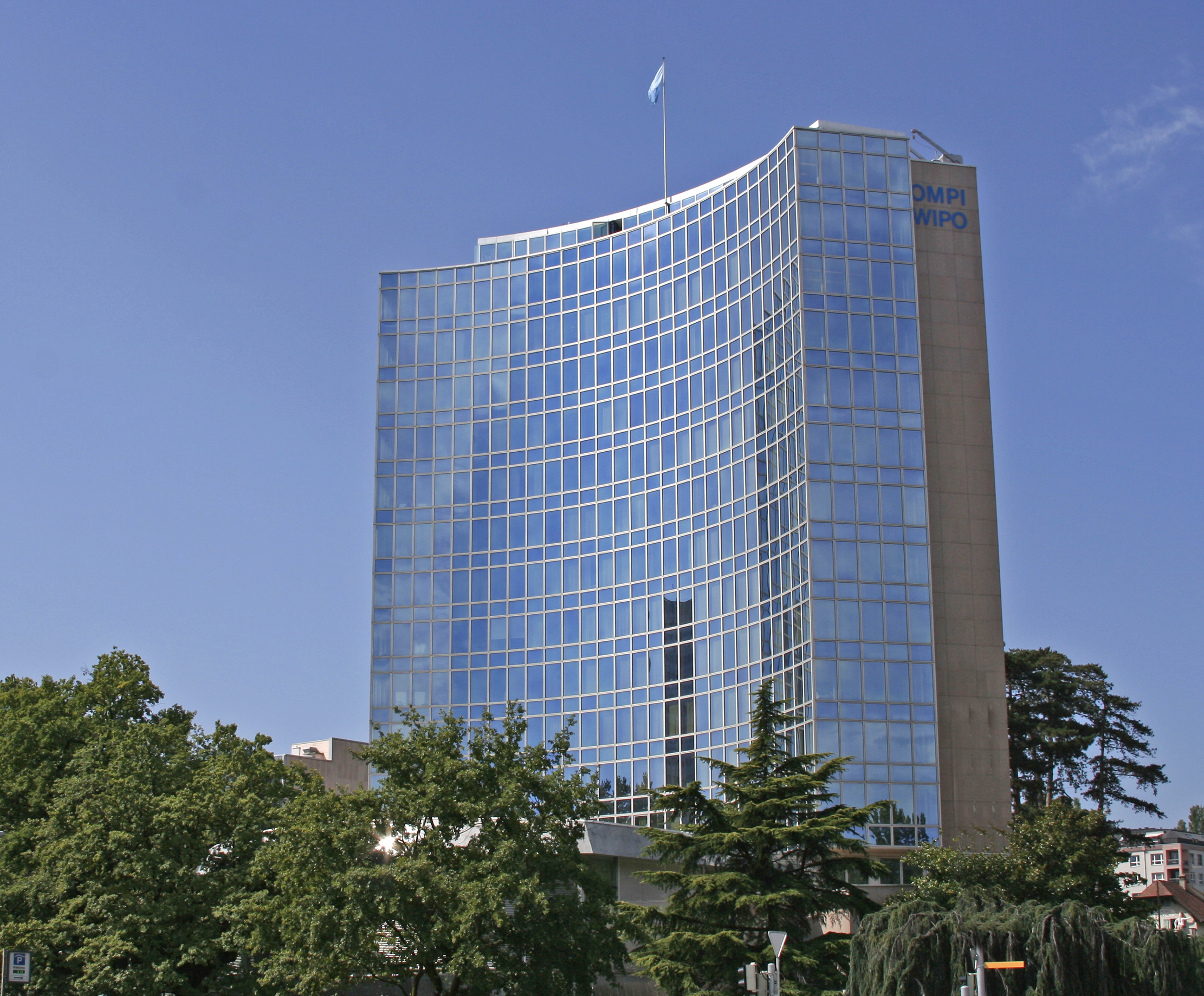
World Intellectual Property Organization

Azerbaijan ratified World Intellectual Property Organization (WIPO) Convention in 1995, and became a full member of the organization. Azerbaijan is a member of the Assemblies of Berne, Budapest, Hague, IPC, Locarno, Madrid, Nice, PCT and Paris Unions, and executive committee of Paris Union, and Conference, Coordination Committee, General Assembly, Program and Budget Committee of WIPO, and Assemblies of WIPO Copyright Treaty, and WIPO Performances and Phonograms Treaty. Azerbaijan ratified 17 WIPO treaties, and all of them are in force in the territory of Azerbaijan. They are following:

1. Berne Convention (Accession: March 4, 1999; in force: June 4, 1999)
2. Budapest Treaty (Accession: July 14, 2003; in force: October 14, 2003)
3. Hague Agreement (Accession: September 8, 2010; in force: December 8, 2010)
4. Locarno Agreement (Accession: July 14, 2003; in force: October 14, 2003)
5. Madrid Agreement (Marks) (Accession: September 25, 1995; in force: December 25, 1995)
6. Madrid Protocol (Accession: January 15, 2007; in force: April 15, 2007)
7. Nairobi Treaty (Accession: August 20, 2010; in force: September 20, 2010)
8. Nice Agreement (Accession: July 14, 2003; in force: October 14, 2003)
9. Paris Convention (Accession: September 25, 1995; in force: December 25, 1995)
10. Patent Cooperation Treaty (Accession: September 25, 1995; in force: December 25, 1995)
11. Phonograms Convention (Accession: June 1, 2001; in force: September 1, 2001)
12. Rome Convention (Accession: July 5, 2005; in force: October 5, 2005)
13. Strasbourg Agreement (Accession: July 14, 2003; in force: July 14, 2004)
14. UPOV Convention (Accession: November 9, 2004; in force: December 9, 2004)
15. WIPO Convention (Accession: September 25, 1995; in force December 25, 1995)
16. WIPO Copyright Treaty (Accession: January 11, 2006: in force April 11, 2006)
17. WIPO Performances and Phonograms Treaty (Accession: January 11, 2006; in force: April 11, 2006)

== Laws in the field of IP ==
=== The Law on Copyright and related rights of the Republic of Azerbaijan ===
The Law on Copyright and related rights of Azerbaijan was adopted on 5 June 1996. The Law consists of preamble, 5 sections, and 47 articles. The first section deals with the general provisions: aim and scope of the law, main definitions, and existing legislation in this field. The second section defines which works fall into the scope of the copyright, and which not. The Chapter II of Section 2 states Author's rights, and conditions of the reproduction of works protected by IP laws. The duration of copyright is determined in the Chapter III of Section 2. According to the Law, following the creation of work, the copyright of author is generally protected during his or her lifetime, and for 70 years after his or her death.

=== The Law of the Republic of Azerbaijan on Legal Protection of Topographies of Integrated Circuits ===
The Law of Azerbaijan on Legal Protection of Topographies of Integrated Circuits was adopted on 31 May 2002. The Law comprises preamble, 3 Chapters, and 15 Articles. The first Chapter regulates general provisions including the definition of integrated circuits, and topography of IC. The second Chapter is about legal protection of topographies and the rights to topographies, including registration and notification of the rights. Article 12 of the Law determines the period Protection period of the exclusive rights to topography. The exclusive rights to topography are protected up to 10 years. Final provisions of the Law are drafted in the third Chapter.

=== The Law of the Republic of Azerbaijan on Legal Protection of Azerbaijani Folklore Expressions ===
The Parliament of Azerbaijan approved the Law of the Republic of Azerbaijan on Legal Protection of Azerbaijani Folklore Expressions on 16 May 2003. National Folklore Expressions are considered as an integral part of cultural heritage, and special type of intellectual property. The Law deals with the protection of national folklore expressions, and terms of use of them. The Law consists of preamble, 4 Chapters, and 16 Articles. The first Chapter deals with the general provisions, including the scope of protected folklore expressions, and main directions of the state policy in the field of legal Protection of folklore expressions. The second and third Chapters touch on the rules of use of folklore expressions, and protection of intellectual property rights to folklore expressions.

=== The Law of the Republic of Azerbaijan on Legal Protection of Compilations of Data ===
The Parliament of Azerbaijan passed the Law of the Republic of Azerbaijan on Legal Protection of Compilations of Data on 14 September 2004. The Law deals with the legal issues regarding the creation and use of compilations of data regardless of their forms, and consists of preamble, 6 Chapters, and 20 Articles. The first Chapter as a rule touches on the general issues such as definitions of the terms used throughout the Law. The second and third Chapters are about copyright to protected subject matters, right to special protection, rights and obligations of the producer of compilations of data, and duties of legitimate user of compilations of data. The fourth and fifth Chapters of the Law regulates liability for illegal use of compilations of data, and protection of rights to compilations of data.

=== The Law of Azerbaijan on Enforcement of the Intellectual Property Rights and Fight against Piracy ===
The Law of Azerbaijan on Enforcement of the Intellectual Property Rights and Fight against Piracy was adopted on 22 May 2012. The Law aims to protect the rights of holders of intellectual property rights, and to reinforce the enforcement of those rights. The Law comprises preamble, 4 Chapters, and 17 Articles. The second Chapter defines civil, administrative procedures and remedies for infringement of intellectual property rights. Administrative measures against the production and distribution of pirated copies of the copyright and related rights object (audiovisual works, phonograms, videograms, computer programs, databases, books, etc.) are drafted in the third Chapter of the Law.

== The Copyright Agency of Azerbaijan ==
The Copyright Agency of Azerbaijan is a central executive power to implement state policies in the field of intellectual property rights. On 6 September 2017, the President of Azerbaijan adopted a Decree to approve the Statute of the Agency. There is Enforcement Centre on Intellectual Property Rights under the Copyright Agency. The Centre performs its function in accordance with its Statute approved by the Decision of The Copyright Agency of Azerbaijan dated on 7 September 2012.

== See also ==
1. World Intellectual Property Organization
2. Copyright Agency of Azerbaijan
3. Copyright Law of Azerbaijan
4. Judiciary of Azerbaijan
