= National Revival Day =

Public holiday in Azerbaijan

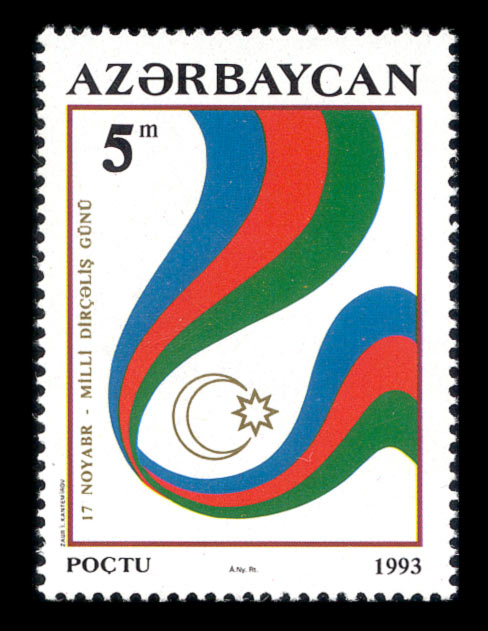
A 1993 stamp of Azerbaijan dedicated to the holiday.

National Revival Day (Azerbaijani: Milli Dirçəliş Günü) is a national holiday celebrated in Azerbaijan every year on the 17th of November since 1992. On November 17, 1988, rallies in favor of Azerbaijani independence began in Azadlig Square (former Lenin Square), the main square of Baku. On the night of December 4, the Soviet Army attacked and forcibly evacuated the square, arresting the demonstrators who spent the night there. Afterwards, protests and demonstrations were held in Baku and other cities for several days, leading to the formation of the Popular Front of Azerbaijan in late 1988 and Azerbaijan becoming an independent state just three years later. Since 2006, if the holiday falls on a weekend, the following working day is considered a non-working day.
