= State Procurement Agency (Azerbaijan) =

Azerbaijan governmental agency

State Procurement Agency of Azerbaijan Republic
- Azərbaycan Respublikasının Satınalmalar üzrə Dövlət Agentliyi
- Coat of Arms of Azerbaijan

Agency overview
- Formed: May 16, 1997
- Headquarters: 40 U. Hajibeyov Street, Government House, Gate 4, 2nd floor, Baku, Azerbaijan Republic AZ1000
- Agency executive: Shahin Abbasov, Director of State Procurement Agency
- Website: www.tender.gov.az

The State Procurement Agency of Azerbaijan Republic (Azerbaijani: Azərbaycan Respublikasının Satınalmalar üzrə Dövlət Agentliyi) is a governmental agency within the Cabinet of Azerbaijan in charge of regulation of activities related to procurement of goods (works and services) purchased by state funds in Azerbaijan Republic. The committee is headed by Shahin Abbasov.

== History ==
The State Procurement Agency (SPA) was established by the Presidential Decree No.583 on May 16, 1997. Its formal charter was approved by Decree No.855 of the President of the Azerbaijan Republic on February 20, 2003.

== Structure ==
Government House, Baku

The agency is led by its Director aided by Chief of Staff. The agency contains the Department of Training Organization, International Relations, Law and Hearing Complaints, Sector of Training Organization, International Relations, Department of Economic Analysis and Control, Sector of Economic Analysis, General Department, Department of Regulation of Procurement of goods (works and services) and Sector of Electronic Database Formation. The main functions of the agency are establishment and improvement of the legal base which oversees public procurement in the country; ensuring control over the legality of procurement of goods and services, purchased with the funds provided by the government; control over tender activities of the government; taking measures for improvement of qualification of specialists of procurement organizations in the field of public procurement; ensuring fair competition during tenders held on public procurement, etc. Among the first documents by the agency were the Charter "On procurement of goods (works and services) by budgetary organizations" which regulate public procurement in Azerbaijan Republic which was approved by on December 19, 1996. According to the agency, it organized 8,636 tenders with the value of signed contracts amounting to AZN 998.3 million in 2009.

== See also ==
- Cabinet of Azerbaijan
- Economy of Azerbaijan
