= Neftchiler Avenue =

Street in Baku, Azerbaijan

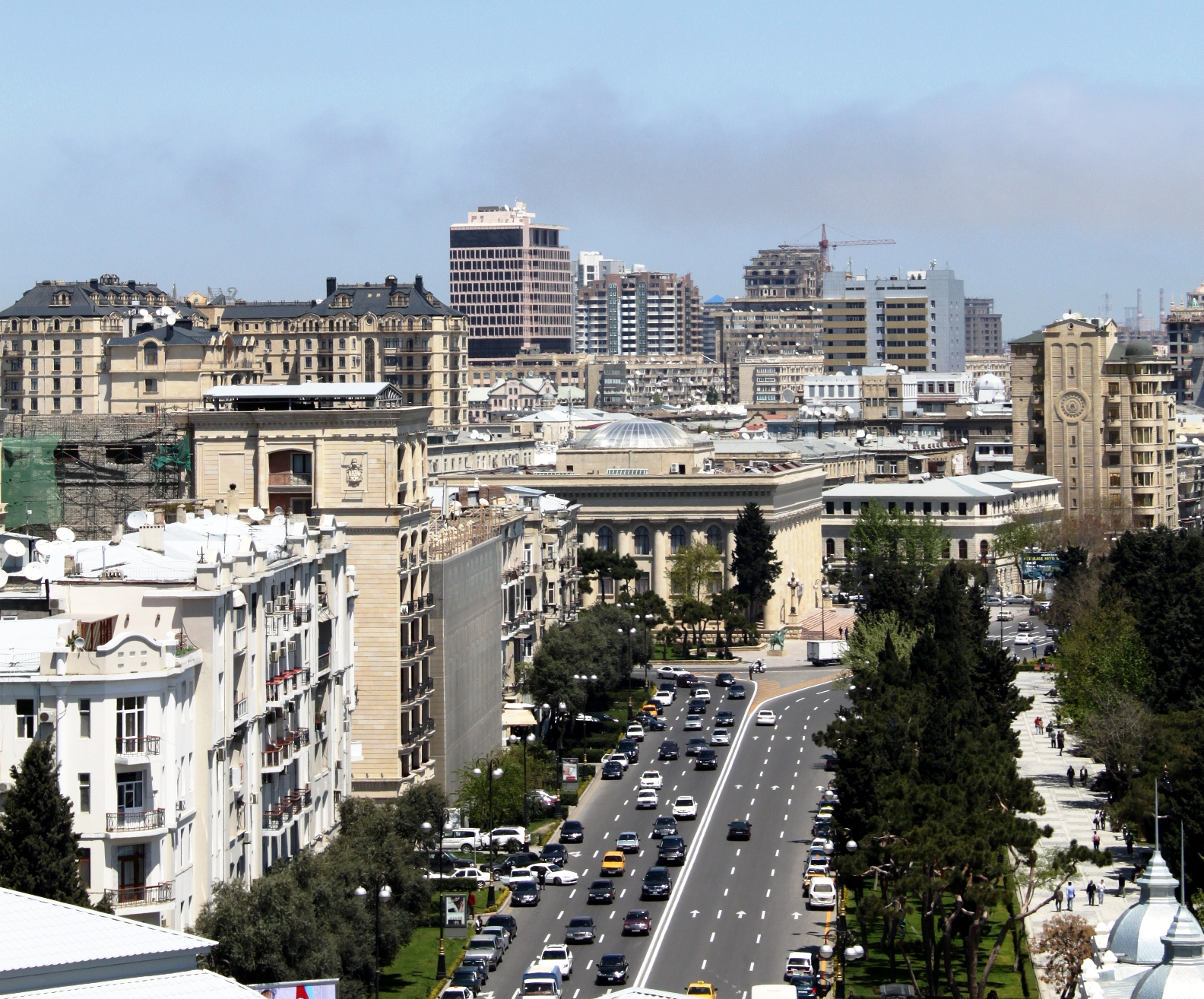
- Interactive map of Neftchiler Avenue
- Maintained by: City of Baku
- Coordinates: 40.3597°N 49.8340°E
- East end: Javanshir Bridge
- Major junctions: Uzeyir Hajibeyov Street
- West end: Bayil, Sabail raion of Baku

Neftchiler Avenue (Azerbaijani: Neftçilər Prospekti; literally Oil Workers' Prospect (Note: A prospect is a Soviet urban road in between a boulevard, an avenue and a stroad)) is an arterial road in Baku, Azerbaijan. It begins at the west end of the Bayil district of Baku and continues east until terminating at Javanshir Bridge (formerly Gagarin Bridge), intersecting Uzeyir Hajibeyov Street. It is used as part of the Baku City Circuit, including the start/finish straight located next to Government House

Previous names of Neftchiler Avenue were Alexander II Quay, Gubanov Quay, and Stalin Avenue. The street was named Neftchilar Avenue in 1961 in honour of workers of oil industry in Azerbaijan. The larger section of the avenue runs along Baku Boulevard.

== Notable buildings and monuments ==
- Оffice of State Oil Fund of Azerbaijan
- State Maritime Administration of Azerbaijan Republic
- International Mugam Center of Azerbaijan
- Maiden Tower
- Baku Puppet Theatre
- Azerbaijan National Carpet Museum
- Government House
- Baku port
- National Flag Square

== Gallery ==
Naberezhnaya Aleksandra II

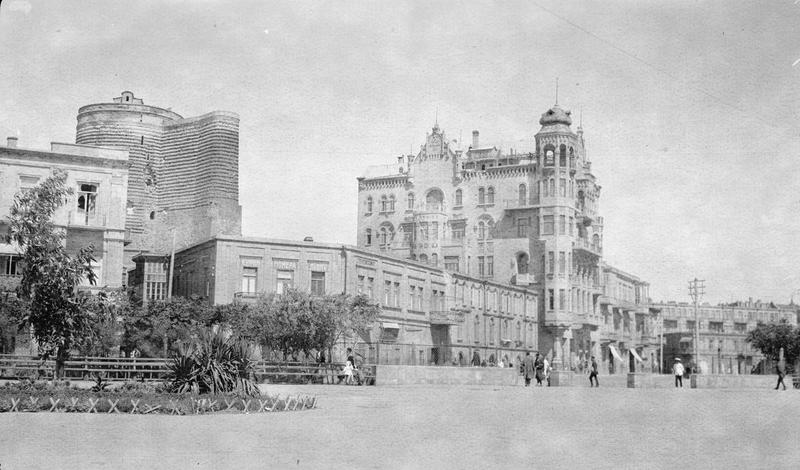
House of Hajinsky, 1918-1920

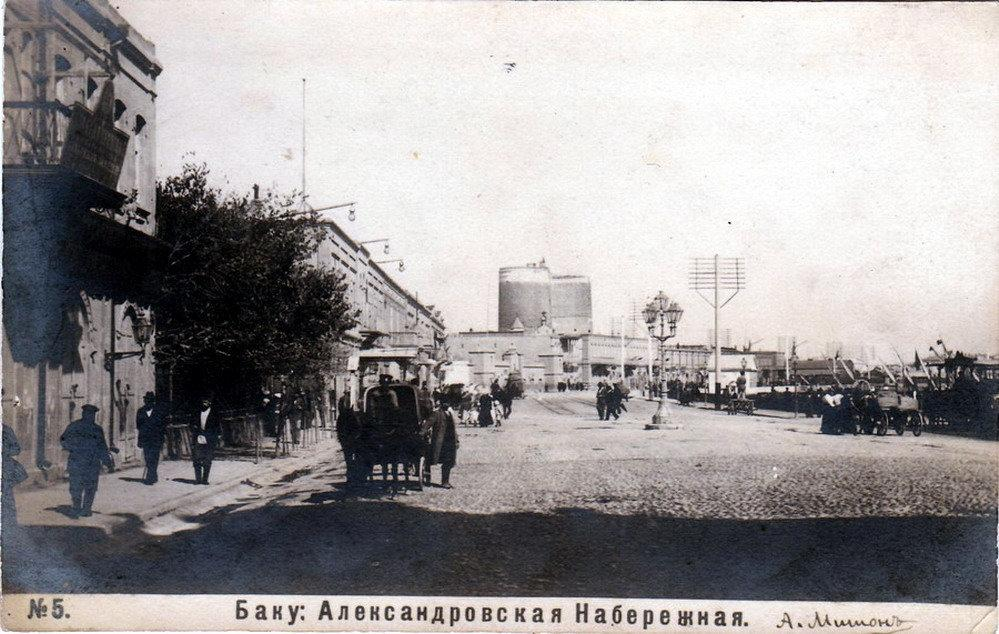
Aleksandrovskaya Naberezhnaya

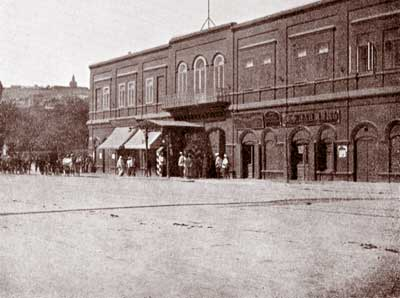
House of the Governor General

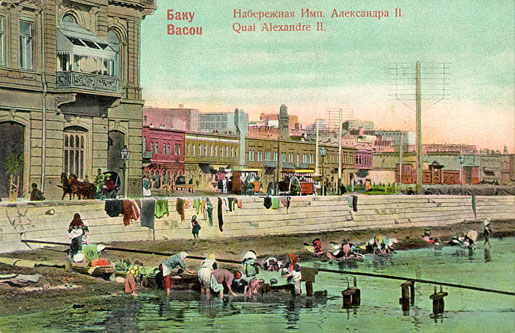
By the boulevard

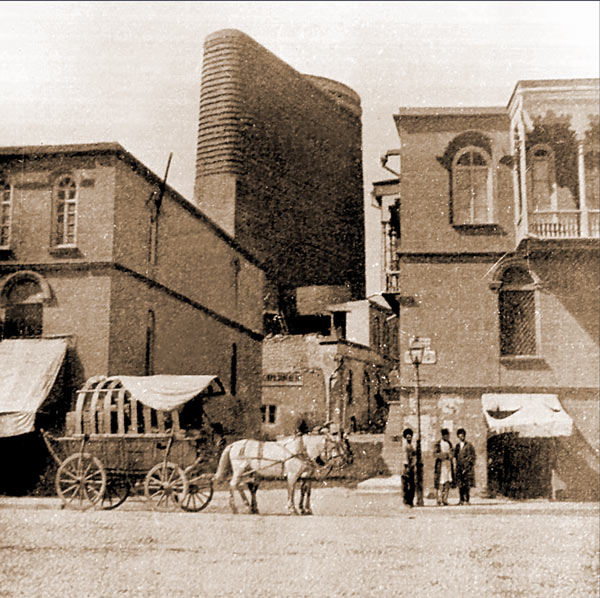
Tip of the Maiden Tower

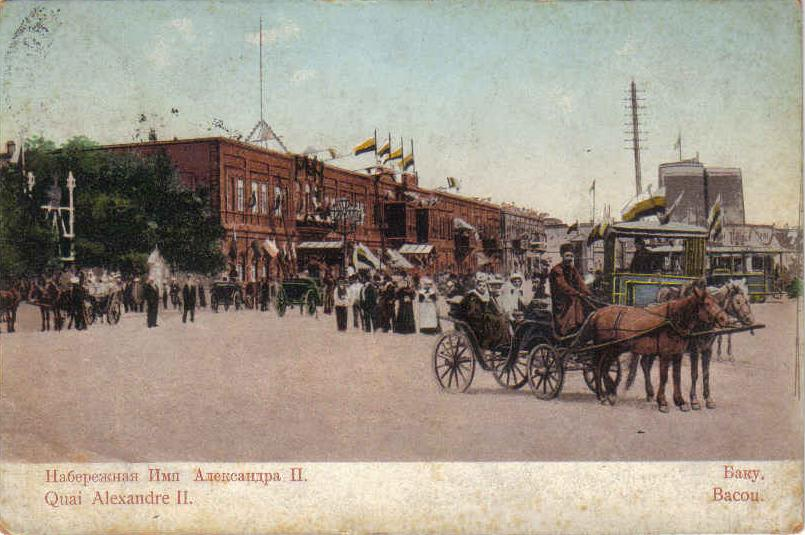
Festivities on Naberezhnaya
Neftchiler Avenue

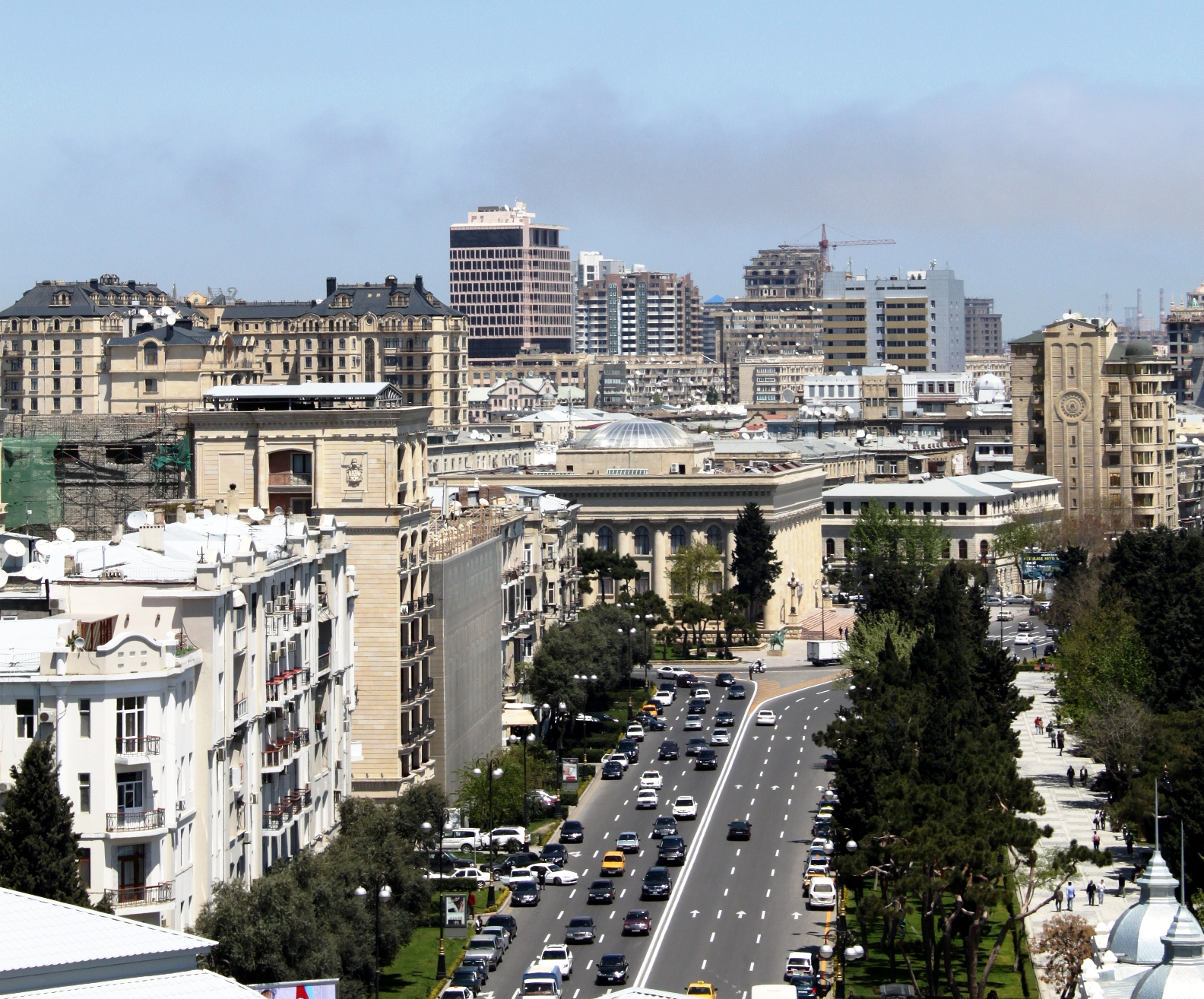
Overlooking the Avenue

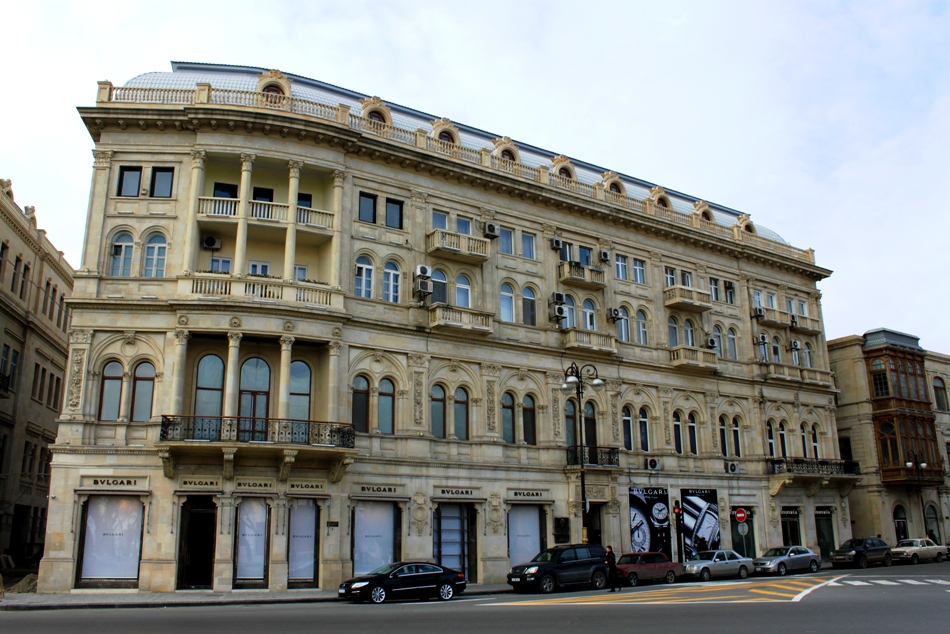
Intersection of Aziz Aliyev Street

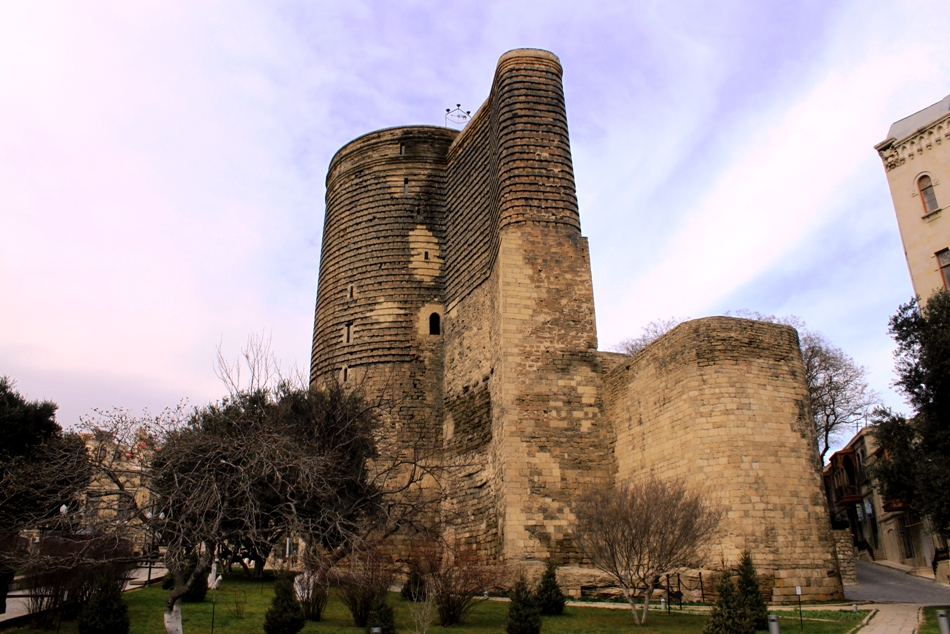
Maiden Tower

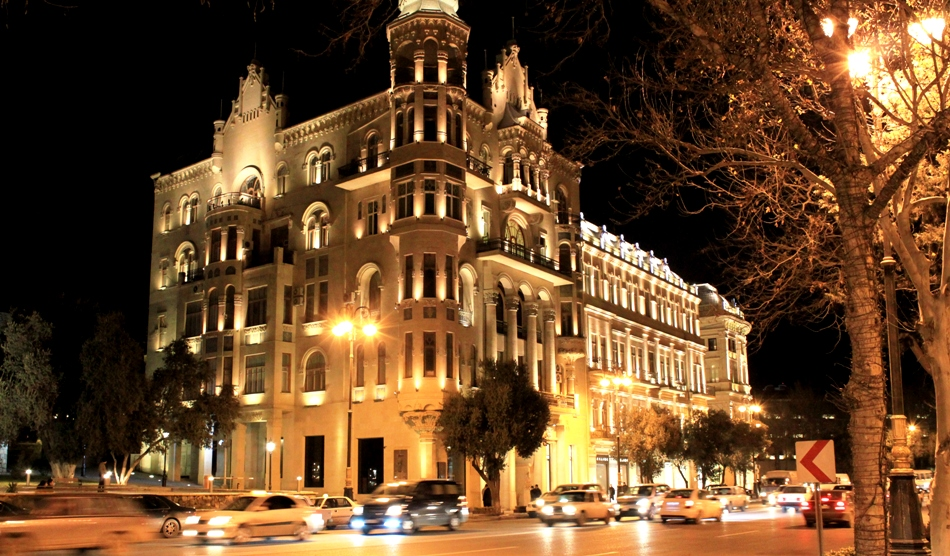
Pathway to Fountains Square

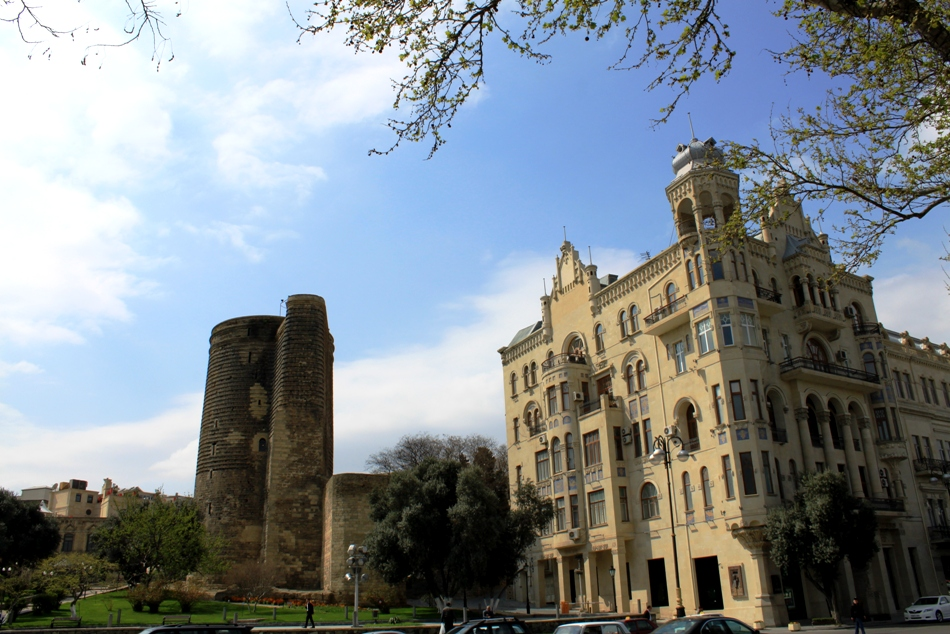
Maiden Tower

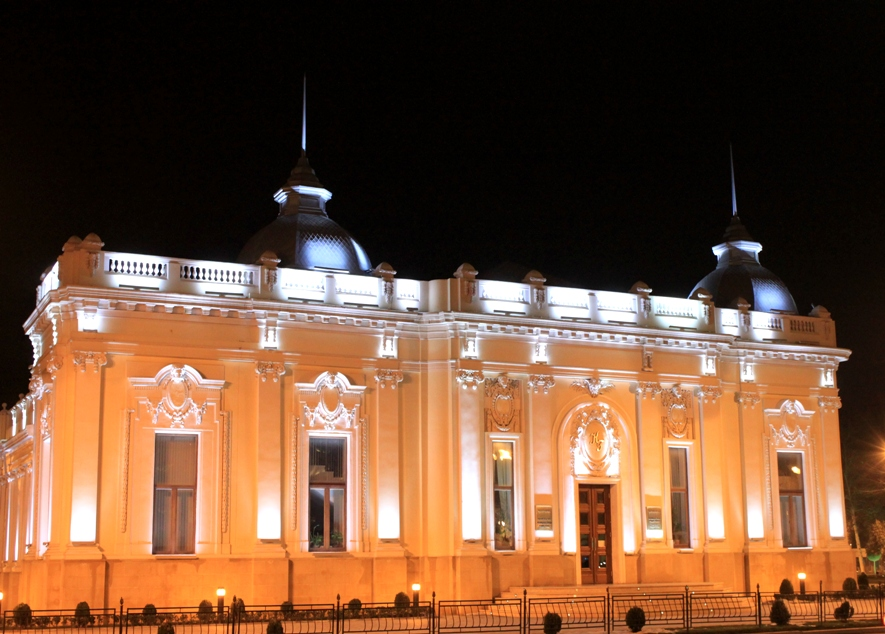
Baku Puppet Theatre

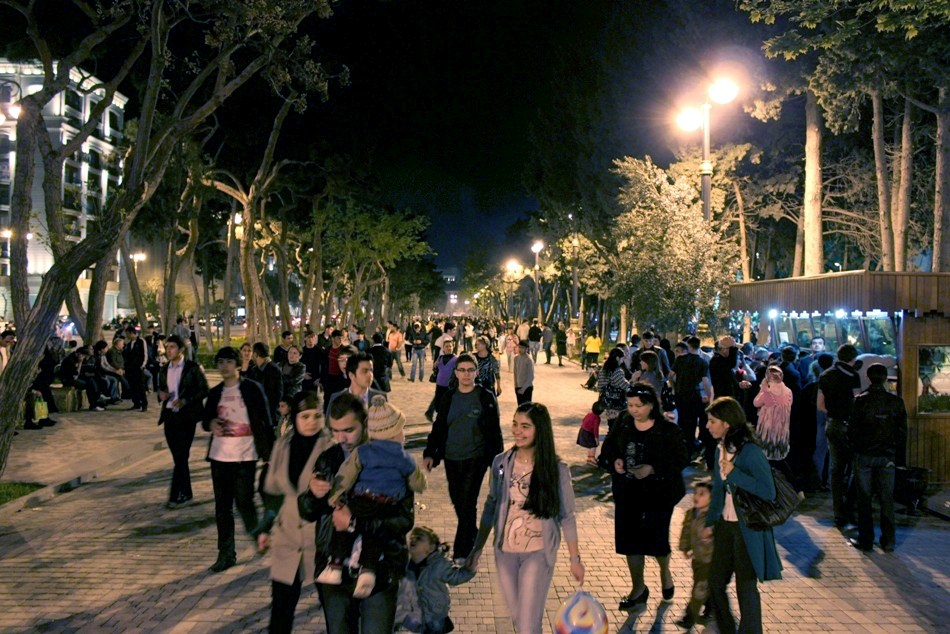
Baku Boulevard

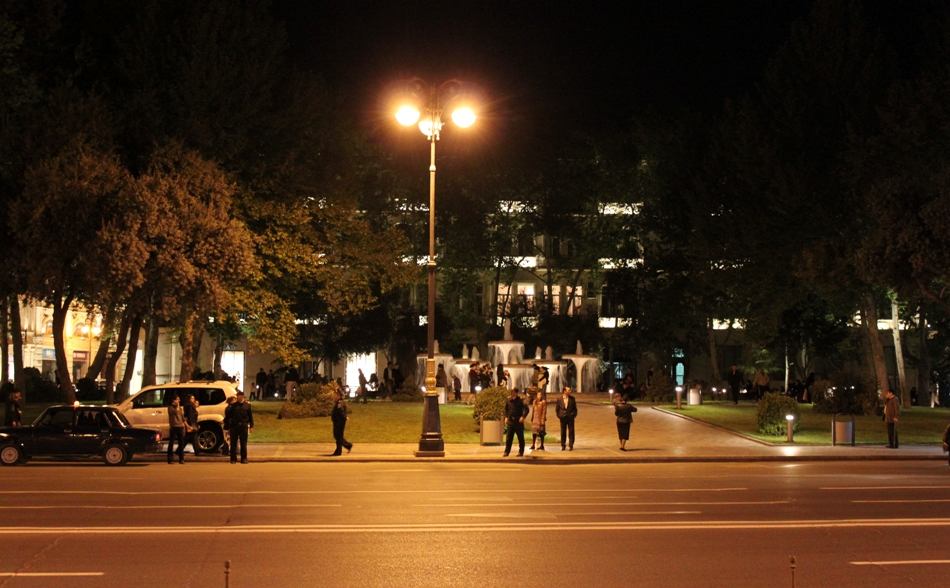
View from Baku Puppet Theater

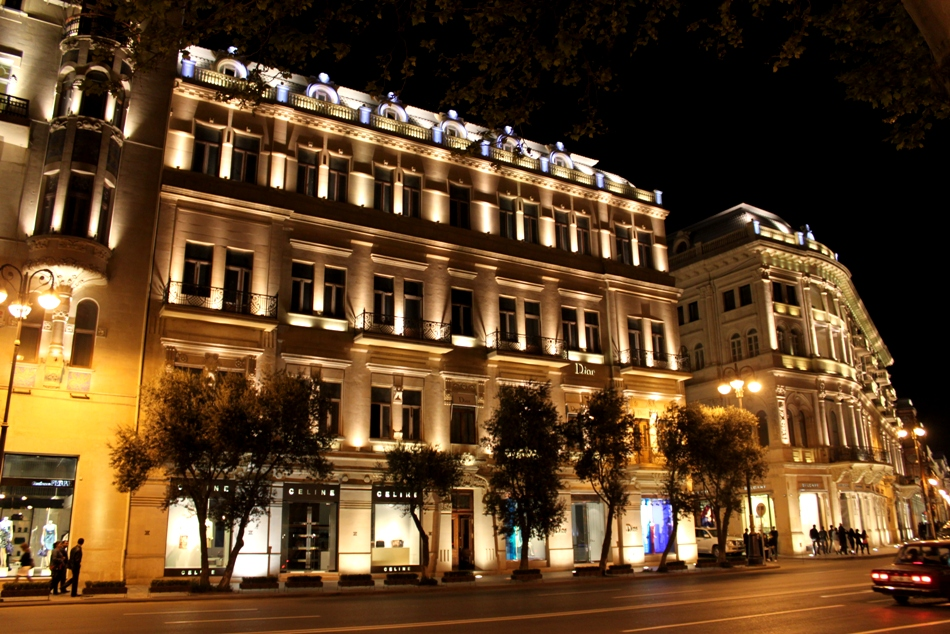
19th century buildings

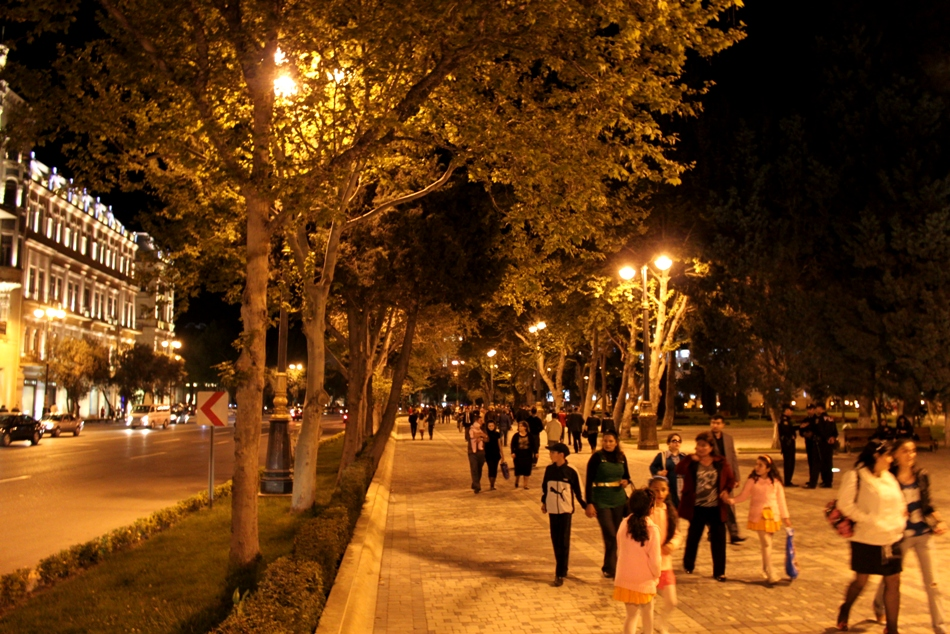
Baku Boulevard

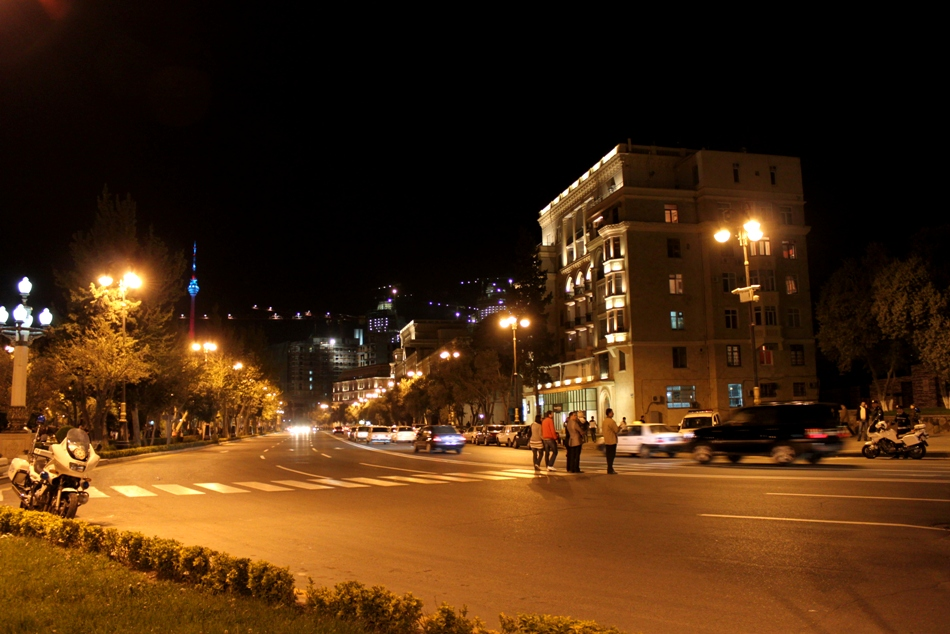
View to Baku TV Tower

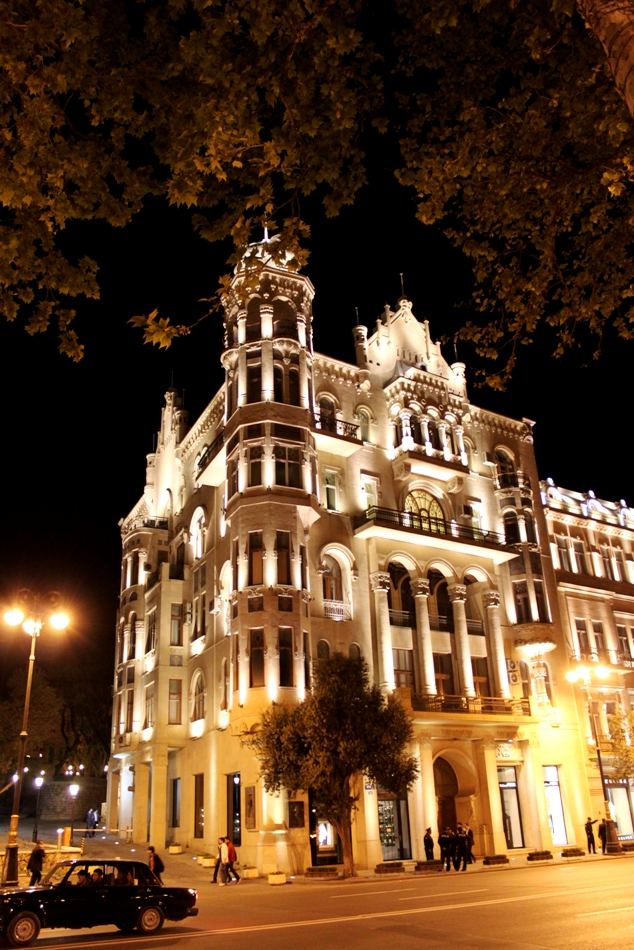
One of entrances to the Icheri Sheher

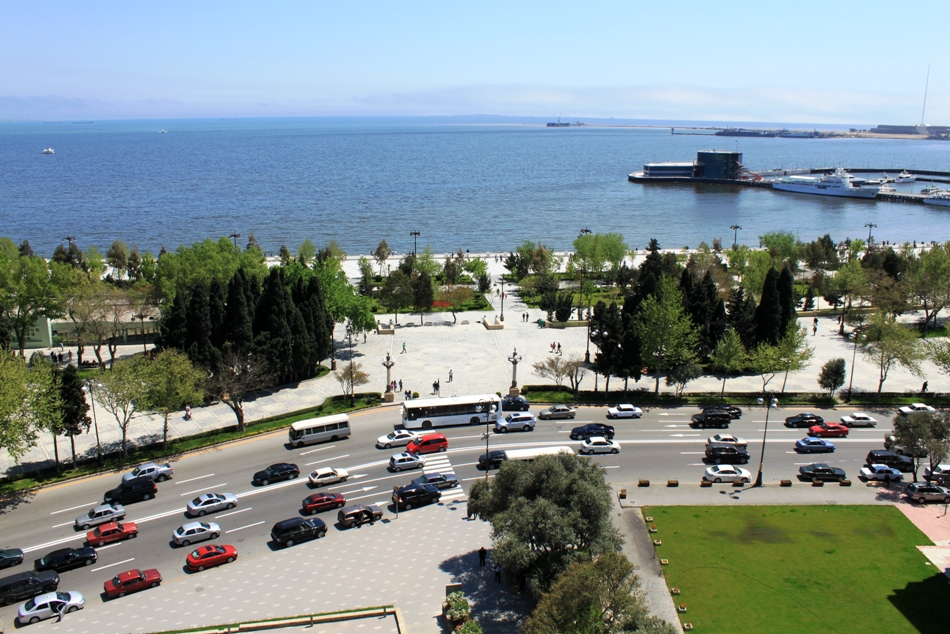
View from top of Maiden Tower
