= Copyright law of Azerbaijan =

Azerbaijani law

Copyright law in Azerbaijan governs copyright in Azerbaijan. The status of copyright law and its protection is regulated by the Law of the Republic of Azerbaijan signed in 1996. The Law on Copyright and Related Rights regulates the relations that arise while creating or using scientific and literary works, as well as works of art. According to this law, adjacent rights to performances, phonograms, and the transfer of broadcasting and cable broadcasting organizations are also streamlined. The Law was amended in 2001, 2002, 2004, 2005, 2008, 2010, 2013, 2017, 2018 and 2021.

Azerbaijan is one of the 190 members of the World Intellectual Property Organization (WIPO).

== The legislative framework ==
The legal framework of the Law on Copyright and Related Rights includes the Law itself, the Civil Code and legislative acts of the Republic of Azerbaijan.

Legislative acts related to copyright and related rights:

- Law on Entrepreneurship (December 15, 1992);
- Law on Culture; (December 21, 2012)
- The Act on the Theaters; (December 26, 2006)
- Law on Cinematography; (July 3, 1998)
- Law on Broadcasting; (June 25, 2002)
- Law on Advertising and others; (May 15, 2015)
- Law on e-commerce; (January 1, 2017)
- Law on Electronic Signature and Electronic Document Management. (March 9, 2004)

== State policy in the field of copyright ==
The main bodies providing protection of copyright law and related rights are the Intellectual Property Rights Protection Center (the Law on the Protection of Intellectual Property in Azerbaijan was signed in 1996) and the Republican Agency for the Protection of Copyright and Related Rights. There is also a national registry on copyright laws’ protection on the Internet. In case of copyright infringement, the interference of the Ministry of Internal Affairs is mandatory.

Originally a work was protected for 50 years pma, or from the date of disclosure for anonymous or pseudonymous works. Performer's property rights are protected for 50 years from the date of the performance. Reverse engineering is permissible by persons lawfully in possession of software. The current general term is 70 pma. It appears that the term changed with the 2010 law.

Azerbaijan has introduced a system of copyright protection on the Internet. The number of objects that experience copyright protection has grown quickly.

There are only two types of information: public and private (confidential).

1. a public type of information: "daily news", "information articles about various events and facts", etc.

2. a private type of information: "commercial secret", "state secret", "personal or family secret." Protection of information of this kind is provided by legislation.

== Employee works and copyright ==
Works created by employees during the employment have specific copyright regime. A contract between employer and employee may specify the details of copyright over such works created by the employees. Based on such agreement, employer may obtain certain copyright over the works created by the employees.

== See also ==
- Copyright Agency of the Republic of Azerbaijan
- List of parties to international copyright treaties
- Intellectual Property Law in Azerbaijan
