= Timeline of Baku =

The following is a timeline of the history of the city of Baku, Azerbaijan.

== Prior to the 20th century ==
- 12th century CE – Maiden Tower (Baku) built.
- 1169 – Lezgi Mosque built.
- 1378 – Juma Mosque built.
- 1442 – Palatial mosque of Palace of the Shirvanshahs built.
- 1509 – Persians in power.
- 1578 – Ottomans in power.
- 1603 – Persians in power again.
- 1723 – Town taken by Russians.
- 1732 – Oil refinery in operation.
- 1735 – Persians in power again.
- 1747 – Baku Khanate established.
- 1806 – Town taken by Russian forces.
- 1813 – Town becomes part of Russia per Gulistan Treaty.
- 1817 – Cholera outbreak.
- 1823 – Paraffin factory begins operating.
- 1832 – "First secular Russian school" opens.
- 1846 – Baku becomes part of the Shemakh province.
- 1859
  - Oil refineries begin operating on the outskirts of town.
  - Town becomes capital of the newly established Baku Governorate.
- 1860 – Population: 13,381.
- 1868
  - Tbilisi-Baku telegraph begins operating.
  - Fountains Square constructed.
- 1875 – Ekinchi begins publication.
- 1878 – Iosif Dzahkerli becomes mayor.
- 1883 – Batum-Baku railway built.
- 1884
  - Baku Railway Station built.
  - Oil Extractors Congress Council established.
- 1886 – Population: 45,679.
- 1887
  - Baku Polytechnicum established.
  - Armenian Saint Gregory the Illuminator's Church, Baku built.
- 1897 – Population: 112,253.
- 1900 – Population: 179,133.

== 20th century ==
- 1901 – Synagogue built.
- 1902 – Baku International Sea Trade Port opens.
- 1903 – July: Labor strike.
- 1904
  - Balakhany and Bibi-Eibat Workers Organisation founded.
  - City hall built.
- 1905
  - Armenian–Tatar massacre.
  - Irshad newspaper begins publication.
- 1907 – Batumi-Baku oil pipeline constructed.
- 1909 – Baku Boulevard constructed.
- 1910 – Phenomenon cinema built.
- 1912 – Philharmonic Hall built.
- 1913
  - Ismailiyya building constructed.
  - Population: 237,000.
- 1914 – Taza Pir Mosque built.
- 1917 – Iranian communist Edalat Party founded in Baku.
- 1918
  - March Days interethnic conflict.
  - September Days massacre of Armenians.
  - Baku becomes capital of Azerbaijan Democratic Republic.
- 1919
  - Baku State University founded.
  - Molodezh Azerbaijana newspaper begins publication.
- 1920
  - 28 April: 11th Army (Soviet Union) takes city.
  - Baku becomes capital of Azerbaijan Soviet Socialist Republic.
  - Azerbaijan State Symphony Orchestra and Baku Polytechnic Institute founded.
  - Azerbaijan State Academic Opera and Ballet Theater active.
  - Kirov raion created.
- 1922
  - 7 November: Avraamov's Symphony of Sirens performed.
  - State Drama Theatre opens.
- 1923
  - National Library of Azerbaijan opens on Torgovaya.
  - Baku Theatre Technical School founded.
- 1925 – Baku Workers' and Peasants Theatre opens.
- 1928 – Theatre of Young Spectators founded.
- 1931 – Baku Puppet Theatre established.
- 1939 – Population: 809,347 metro.
- 1940 – Baku Museum of Education founded.
- 1941 – Kishlinsky district created.
- 1945 – Azerbaijan State Institute for the Arts active.
- 1949 – Sumqayit developed near city.
- 1951 – Stalin Stadium opens.
- 1952 – Government House built.
- 1965 – Population: 737,000 city; 1,137,000 urban agglomeration.
- 1967
  - Baku Metro begins operating.
  - Azerbaijan Carpet Museum established.
- 1979 – Population: 1,046,000.
- 1985 – Population: 1,693,000 (estimate).
- 1989
  - Azadliq newspaper begins publication.
  - Baku Islamic Madrasa established.
- 1990
  - January:
    - Baku pogrom of Armenians.
    - Black January.
  - Sanan Alizade becomes mayor.
- 1991
  - City becomes capital of Azerbaijan Republic.
- 1993
  - Rafael Allahverdiyev becomes mayor.
- 1994
  - 1994 Baku Metro bombings.
  - Azerbaijan State Pantomime Theatre founded.
- 1995
  - October: 1995 Baku Metro fire.
- 2000 – 25 November: The 6.8 M_{w} Baku earthquake affected the region.

== 21st century ==
- 2001 – Hajibala Abutalybov becomes mayor.
- 2005 – Center for Economic and Social Development established.
- 2006
  - Baku–Tbilisi–Ceyhan pipeline in operation.
  - State Maritime Administration (Azerbaijan) headquartered in city.
- 2008
  - December: International Mugham Center of Azerbaijan opens.
- 2009 – Uzeyir Hajibeyov International Music Festival begins.
- 2010
  - National Flag Square opens in Bayil.
  - SOCAR Tower construction begins.
- 2012
  - Baku Crystal Hall built.
  - Heydar Aliyev Center opens.
  - May: Eurovision Song Contest 2012 held in city.
  - Population: 2,122,300.
- 2013
  - Flame Towers opens.
- 2014
  - Lycée français de Bakou opened. Ilham Aliyev and his wife participated in the opening ceremony.
- 2015
  - Baku National Stadium opens.
  - March: Baku Olympic Stadium opens.
  - June: 2015 European Games held in city.

== See also ==
- History of Baku
- Other names of Baku

== Bibliography ==
Published in 19th century

- Jedidiah Morse; Richard C. Morse (1823), "Baku", New Universal Gazetteer (4th ed.), New Haven: S. Converse
- Edward Balfour, ed. (1871). "Bakoh". Cyclopaedia of India and of Eastern and Southern Asia (2nd ed.). Madras.
- Charles Marvin (1883). Baku: the Petrolia of Europe. London: R. Anderson & Co.
- F. H. Trevithick (1886), A Sketchy Report on the Petroleum Industry at Baku, Cairo: National Printing Office, OL 23382205M
- "Baku", Hand-book for Travellers in Russia, Poland, and Finland (4th ed.), London: J. Murray, 1888

Published in 20th century

- "Baku", Chambers's Encyclopaedia, London: W. & R. Chambers, 1901, hdl:2027/uc2.ark:/13960/t5bc48059 – via HathiTrust
- James Dodds Henry (1905), Baku: an Eventful History, London: A. Constable & Co., OCLC 24454390, OL 6972546M
- "Baku", Jewish Encyclopedia, vol. 2, New York, 1907
- Kropotkin, Peter Alexeivitch (1910). "Baku (town)" . Encyclopædia Britannica. Vol. 3 (11th ed.). pp. 230–231.
- William Eleroy Curtis (1911). "(Baku)". Around the Black Sea. New York: Hodder & Stoughton. hdl:2027/uc2.ark:/13960/t3222tf2d.
- W. Barthold (1913). "Baku". Encyclopaedia of Islam. Leiden: Brill. ISBN 9004097961.
- "Baku", Russia, Leipzig: Karl Baedeker, 1914, OCLC 1328163
- William Henry Beable (1919), "Baku", Russian Gazetteer and Guide, London: Russian Outlook
- Kurban Said (1937). Ali und Nino (in German). Vienna. (Novel set in Baku)
- Alstadt, Audrey L. The Azerbaijani Bourgeoisie and the Cultural-Enlightenment Movement in Baku: First Steps Toward Nationalism. 1983
- Audrey Altstadt-Mirhadi, “Baku: Transformation of a Muslim Town,” in The City in Late Imperial Russia, ed. Michael F. Hamm (Bloomington: Indiana University Press, 1986)
- Altstadt, A., 'The Baku city duma: arena for elite conflict', Central Asian Survey, 5 (1986)

Published in 21st century

- C. Edmund Bosworth, ed. (2007). "Baku". Historic Cities of the Islamic World. Leiden: Koninklijke Brill. ISBN 978-9004153882.
- Michael R.T. Dumper and Bruce E. Stanley, ed. (2008), "Baku", Cities of the Middle East and North Africa, Santa Barbara, USA: ABC-CLIO, ISBN 9781576079195
- "Baku". Grove Encyclopedia of Islamic Art & Architecture. Oxford University Press. 2009.
