= List of statues in Baku =

List of the statues and memorials in Baku, the capital of Azerbaijan.

== Statues ==
Statues of outstanding people
Year	Image	Person	Location	Note
1930		Mirza Fatali Akhundov	At the intersection of Bunyad Sardarov and Said Rustamov, Ahmed Javad streets	
1959		Bahramgur	At the Neftchilar Avenue	
1923		26 Baku Commissars	In the square of 26 Baku Commissars (Current name of street is Sahil Garden)	
1949		Nizami Ganjavi Muhammad Fuzuli Molla Panah Vagif Mirza Fatali Akhundov Khurshidbanu Natavan Jalil Mammadguluzadeh Jafar Jabbarly	In front of Nizami Museum of Azerbaijani Literature	
1958		Mirza Alakbar Sabir	In the Istiglaliyyat Street, Mirza Alakbar Sabir Garden	From 1922 to 1958, there was another statue in the place of the monument of the poet.
1960		Uzeyir Hajibeyov	İn front of the National Conservatory of Azerbaijan	
1955		Vladimir Lenin	at the 11th Red Army square (now – Azadlig Square). On the building of the House of Government of Azerbaijan	In 1991, the monument was replaced by the national flag of the Republic of Azerbaijan.
1961		Samad Vurgun	Pushkin Street (Baku)	
1962		Fuzûlî	In front of the Azerbaijan State Academic National Drama Theatre	
1968		26 Commissars Memorial	In the square of 26 Baku Commissars (Current name of street is Sahil Garden)	
1968		Mikayil Mushfig	Inshaatchilar Avenue	
1972		Nariman Narimanov	Nariman Narimanov Avenue	
1973		Mehdi Huseynzade	At the intersection of Tbilisi Avenue and Bakikhanov Street	
1980		Imadaddin Nasimi	At the intersection of Samad Vurgun Street and Nizami Street	
1998		Yusif Mammadaliyev	In the Istiglaliyyat Street, near the Ismailiyya Palace	
2002		Azim Azimzade	In the Old City (Baku)	
2012		Monument to Koroghlu	At the intersection of Azadlig Avenue and Vagif Avenue	
2014		Gara Garayev Monument	In the 28 May Street	

== Busts ==
Year	Person	Image	Location	Note
1920s	Friedrich Engels		Primorsky Boulevard	The monument is written in Azerbaijani with Arabic letters: ENGELS

== Monuments and memorials ==
Year	Name	Image	Location	Note
1960	Statue of a Liberated Woman		At the intersection of Shikhali Gurbanov and Jafar Jabbarli's streets	The monument depicts a woman removing the veil. İt was built by Fuad Abdurahmanov
1988	"Eternal Flame"		Martyrs' Lane	

== See also ==
- List of Monuments in Azerbaijan
- Nizami Museum of Azerbaïjani Literature § The building statues of six famous Azerbaijani writers
