= Baku City Executive Power =

Coordinates: 40.3668°N 49.8314°E

Executive Power of the Baku City
- Azerbaijani: Bakı Şəhər İcra Hakimiyyəti
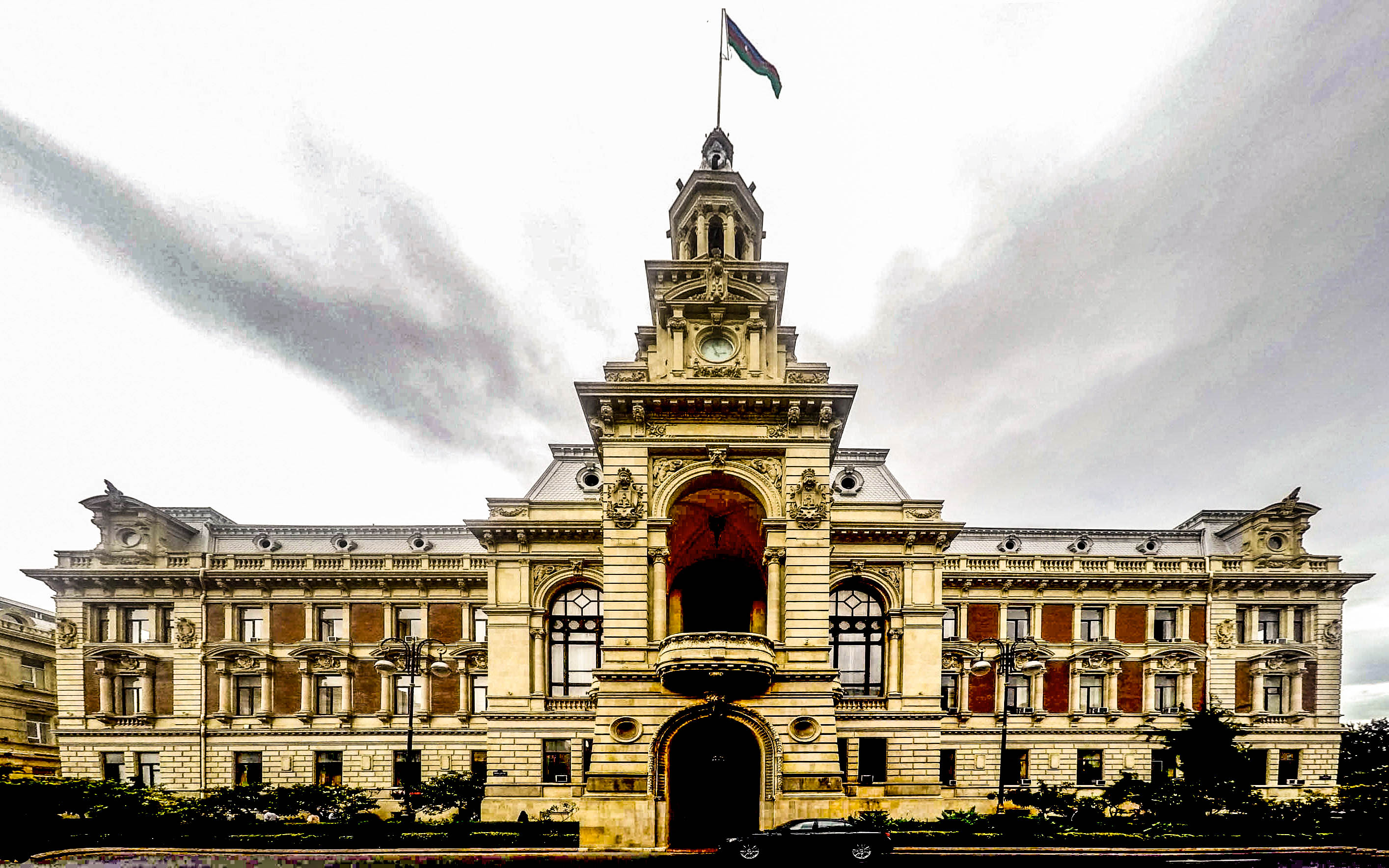
- Alternative names: Mayoralty of Baku, Baksovet, Bakı Soveti (Baku Council)

General information
- Architectural style: Baroque
- Location: Baku, Sabail Raion, Istiglaliyyat St. 4, Azerbaijan
- Construction started: 1900
- Completed: 1904
- Cost: 400,000 Russian rubles
- Owner: Azerbaijani government

Design and construction
- Architect: Józef Gosławski

The Executive Power of the Baku City, informally called the mayoralty of Baku or the Baku Soviet (Baksovet), is the executive authority of Azerbaijan's capital, Baku. Its seat is in the Baroque building, built in the beginning of the 20th century.

== History ==
In 1870, the Baku City Duma was established. It functioned until 1917–18, and later the Baku Soviet, the Baku Public Security Committee, the Baku Council of Public Organizations, and the Baku City Public Self-Government were established in its place.

During Soviet era, the Executive Power of the Baku City was named the Executive Committee of the Baku City Workers' Deputies Council (in 1939–1977), then the Executive Committee of the Baku City Council of People's Deputies (in 1977–1991). Since 1991 it has been named the executive power of the Baku City.

== List ==
Mayor	Term Start	Term End
Pavel Parsadanovich Argutinsky-Dolgorukov	1846	
Iosif Dzhakeli	14 January 1878	January 1879
Stanislav Despot-Zenovich	1879	1893
Khristofor Antonov	1893	?
Konstantin Iretskiy	1896	?
Nikolaus von der Nonne	1898	1901
Alexander Novikov	1903	1904
Kamil Safaraliyev	1904	1906
Pyotr Martynov	1906	?
Mikhail Folbaum	1908	
Pyotr Martynov	1910	
Fyodor Golovin	1912	
Sanan Alizade	18 October 1991	15 April 1992
Aghasalim Baghirov	15 April 1992	4 July 1992
Rauf Gulmammadov	4 July 1992	3 July 1993
Rafael Allahverdiyev	3 July 1993	16 October 2000
Muhammed Abbasov	16 October 2000	30 January 2001
Hajibala Abutalybov	30 January 2001	21 April 2018
Eldar Azizov	15 November 2018	Present

== Building ==
The building of Baku City Executive Power was originally built as three-floor Baku City Duma and was influenced by layout of Hôtel de Ville. It has a spacious vestibule, wide corridors, marble principal staircase and sophisticated interiors. The second floor houses the state rooms and session hall.

The red decorative bricks and colored marble for the construction were brought from Italy. Having posted a tower in the center of main front and uniting it organically with main part, Józef Gosławski provided brightness and entireness of the composition amid complex details and elements. The central part of the facade bears the seal of Baku, which incorporates three golden torches. The building was Gosławski's last work, he died in the year the building was finished.
