= Monument to Alexander Pushkin (Baku) =

Monument in Baku, Azerbaijan

Coordinates: 40°22′30″N 49°51′17″E

- Azerbaijani: Aleksandr Puşkinin heykəli
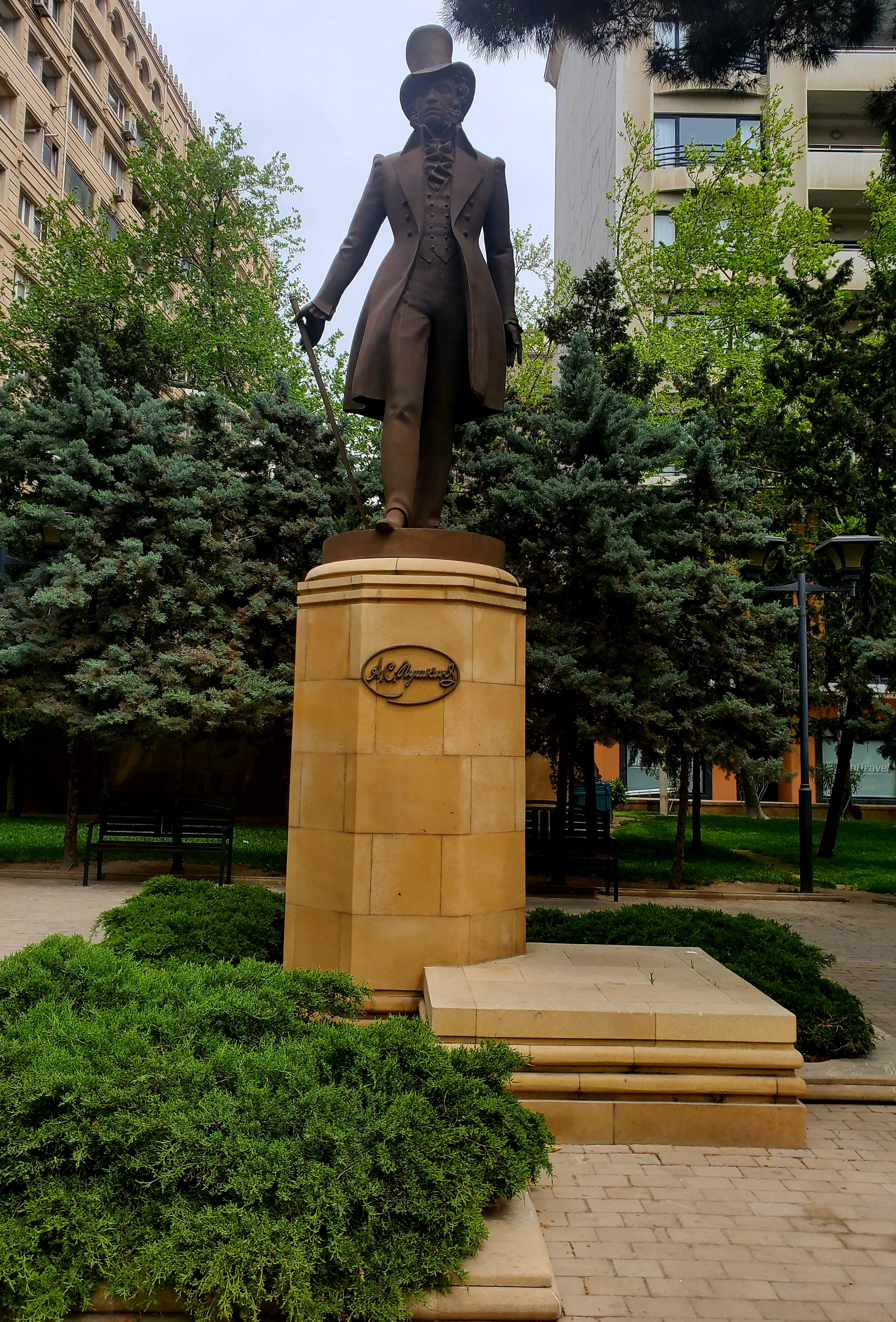
- Interactive map of Monument to Alexander Pushkin
- Location: Baku, Azerbaijan
- Material: bronze, granite
- Opening date: 2001
- Dedicated to: Alexander Pushkin

The Monument to Alexander Pushkin (Azerbaijani: Aleksandr Puşkinin heykəli) is a monument to the Russian poet Alexander Sergeevich Pushkin in Baku, the capital of Azerbaijan. The monument is located in the park with the same name at the intersection of Pushkin and Uzeyir Hajibeyov streets. The author of the bronze monument is the sculptor, and academician of the Russian Academy of Arts – Yuri Orekhov. This monument is the last work of Orekhov.

== History ==
The monument's unveiling took place on 12 October 2001. The ceremony was attended by the President of Azerbaijan, Heydar Aliyev, the Mayor of Baku, Hajibala Abutalibov, and the Ambassador of the Russian Federation to Azerbaijan, Nikolay Ryabov. The monument is a gift of the Russian government to the 10th anniversary of Azerbaijan's independence, celebrated on 18 October.
