= Mikhail Folbaum =

Military figure in the Russian Empire (1866-1916)

Mikhail Sokolov-Sokolinsky

Ataman of Semirechye
- In office 28 November 1908 – 22 October 1916
- Monarch: Nicholas II

Mayor of Baku
- In office 20 February 1908 - 22 November 1908
- Preceded by: Pyotr Martynov
- Succeeded by: Fyodor Golovin

Personal details
- Born: Mikhail Alexandrovich Folbaum; October 22, 1866 Saint Petersburg, Saint Petersburg Governorate, Russian Empire
- Died: October 22, 1916 (aged 50) Verny, Semirechye Oblast, Russian Empire (now Almaty, Kazakhstan)

Military service
- Allegiance: Russian Empire
- Branch/service: (Russian Empire) Russian Imperial Army
- Years of service: 1884–1916
- Rank: Lieutenant general
- Commands: 3rd Siberian Rifle Division; 3rd Semirechensk Regiment; 6th Orenburg Regiment
- Battles/wars: Central Asian revolt of 1916

Mikhail Alexandrovich Sokolov-Sokolinsky (née Folbaum, 22 October 1866 – 22 October 1916) was a military leader and politician in the Russian Empire. He is most known for his role as ataman and military governor of Semirechye during the Central Asian revolt of 1916 and his defense of the region from Kyrgyz rebels.

== Early life ==
Mikhail Alexandrovich Folbaum was born on 22 October 1866 in St. Petersburg to Russian German parents. He grew up in an Eastern Orthodox family. His brother was an architect named Alexander Folbaum [ru] (1864–c. 1926).

== Career ==
Folbaum first entered the military in 1884 when he joined the Alexander Cadet Corps [ru] and graduated from Pavlovsk Military School in St. Petersburg. He then attended and graduated from Nikolaev Academy of the General Staff in 1892. Folbaum joined the Imperial Russian Army general staff when he was promoted to lieutenant colonel in 1893. Between 1893 and 1901 he served in various military positions in Transcaspia and Turkestan.

He commanded the 30th Infantry Division from 1901 to 1904, as well as the 275th Khotyn Infantry Regiment from 1904 to 1907 and the 82nd Dagestan Infantry Regiment in 1907.

In July 1905, while stationed in Kishinev, he was deployed to the port of Odessa to pacify a mutiny on the warship Prince Potemkin. In November of the same year he was deployed again to Ukraine to put down an uprising in Sevastopol.

In 1908, he moved to the Caucasus viceroyalty where he served as mayor of Baku from February to November of that year. After his term as mayor ended, he became ataman of the Semirechye region and commander of the 3rd Semirechensk and 6th Orenburg regiments. In April 1913 he had attained the rank of lieutenant general. He subsequently served as commander of the 3rd Siberian Rifle Division from October 1914 to September 1915.

Folbaum served on the German front of World War I. He was wounded in a German gas attack while commanding a Russian attack near a rural farmstead called Volya Szydlovskaya (located near modern-day Bolimów, Poland).

=== Central Asian revolt of 1916 ===
In August 1916, Folbaum was called away from the German front lines by governor-general of Turkestan Aleksey Kuropatkin to assist in suppressing rebellions in Semirechye, of which Folbaum was military governor. With his two regiments and a small army of Cossack and Russian soldiers, Folbaum defended the cities of Samarkand, Sirdaryo, and Fergana from Kyrgyz rebels and assisted in establishing communications between Russian occupiers of Kyrgyz cities. Before his death, he served in the military courts responsible for handing out the death sentences of Kyrgyz rebels.

== Death ==
On 22 October 1916, his 50th birthday, Folbaum suffered a heart attack and died in the city of Verny (now Almaty, Kazakhstan). He was initially buried at St. Sophia Cathedral, and was reburied at St. Malo-Almatinskaya Cemetery in April 1917. His grave was destroyed and his remains disturbed during the Soviet era of Kazakhstan.

== Personal life ==
Folbaum married Ekaterina Pavlovna Obraztsova in 1897. The couple had six children: Irina, Sophia, Alexey, Alexander, Natalya, and Olga. They resided in Verny.

In September 1916, Folbaum was granted a surname change to Sokolov-Sokolinsky, his mother's surname, due to anti-German sentiment in Russia during the first World War.

== Legacy ==
General Folbaum was honored with the following awards:

- Order of Saint Stanislaus
  - First Class (1913)
  - Second Class (1899)
  - Third Class (1894)
- Order of Saint Anna
  - Second Class (1905)
  - Third Class (1896)
- Order of Saint Vladimir
  - Second Class (1915)
  - Third Class (1910)
  - Fourth Class (1906)
- Golden Weapon for Bravery (1915)

Araltobe, a town in Aktobe region, Kazakhstan, was originally named Folbaumovskaya after Folbaum. The village of Kuturgu in the Tüp district of Issyk-Kul, Kazakhstan, was originally named Ozerno-Folbaumsky after him as well.
