= Heydar Aliyev Sports and Concert Complex =

Sports venue in Baku, Azerbaijan

Heydar Aliyev Sports and Concert Arena
- Interactive map of Heydar Aliyev Sports and Concert Arena
- Location: Tbilisi Avenue, Baku, Azerbaijan
- Coordinates: 40°23′30″N 49°49′30″E
- Capacity: 8,000

Construction
- Groundbreaking: 1977
- Built: 1989
- Opened: 1990
- Renovated: 2006, 2013–15
- Architect: Yuzef Kadimov
- Structural engineer: G.I.Bely

The Heydar Aliyev Sports and Exhibition Complex is the main exhibition space of Baku, Azerbaijan. Named after the former President Heydar Aliyev, it is located on Tbilisi Avenue between Hyatt Hotel and Grand Hotel Europe. Since its opening in 1990, it held about 40 international competitions in different kinds of sports.

The facility seats 8,000 people and being the largest sports facility in Azerbaijan, the complex offers all the necessary conditions for major international competitions.

== History ==
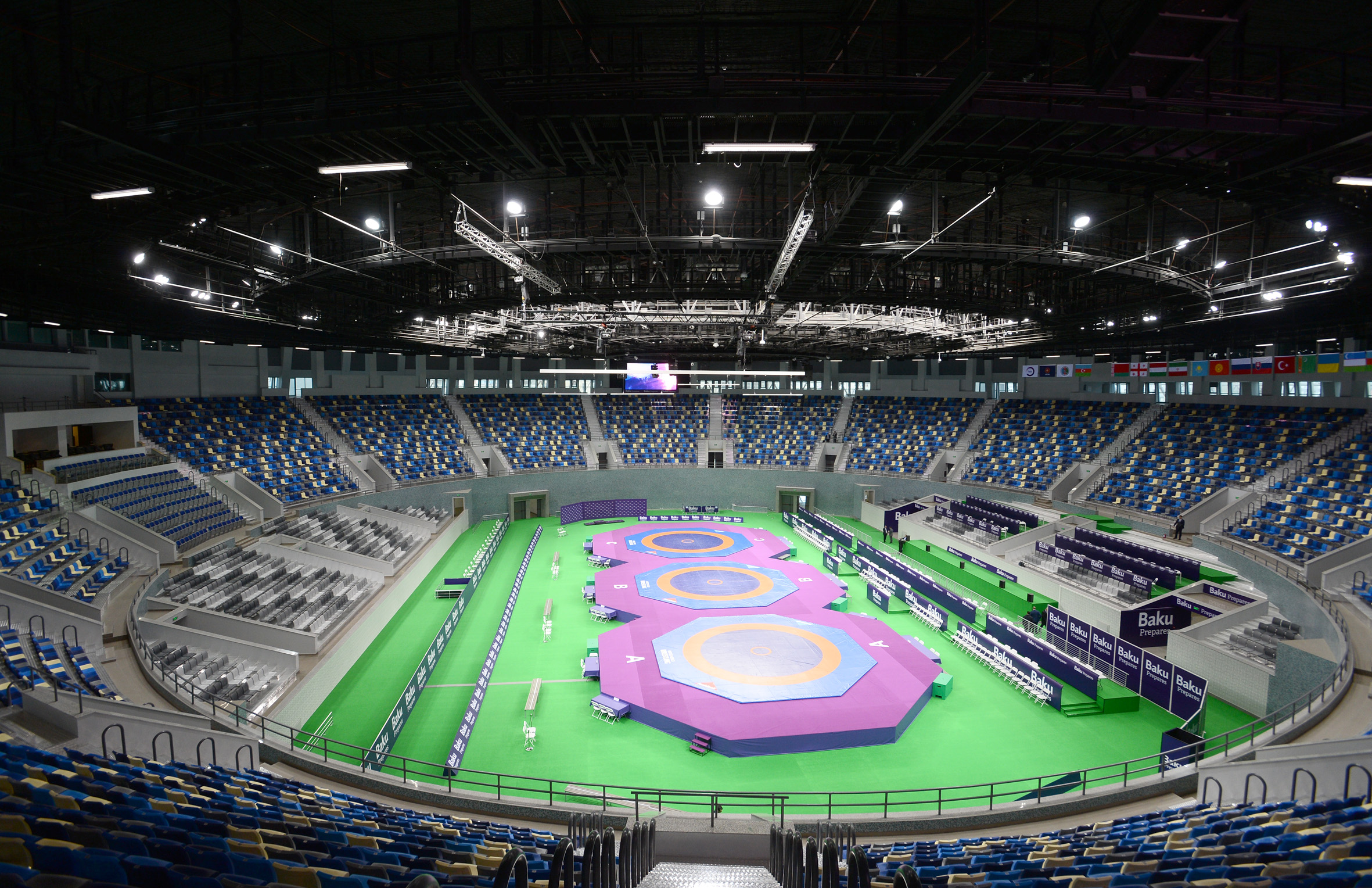
The 8,000-seat auditorium after renovation (April 2015).

The construction of the building started in 1977 but was not completed until 1989. In 2006, the facility underwent renovation with a Serbian company, SERBAZ, replacing the glazing, repairing level one and two lobbies and installing the air conditioning system. The complex currently has an area of 18,000 square metres. After renovation, the Complex was used as the nation's Gymnastics Centre.

In September 2014, due to hosting events for the 2015 European Games, it was announced that the facilities would be renovated, with a drawing hall, an athlete's canteen, a media centre, commentary studio, broadcasting centre and server rooms for processing results of events all to be installed. The finishing of the 7,500-seat auditorium is being done afresh, and provided with comfortable and new seating.

The lighting of the arena was completely replaced – it remained intact since 1989 – huge screens were installed and a new acoustic system developed, all the result of cooperation between leading European manufacturers of equipment, who were the official suppliers of the London and Sochi Olympic Games.

The complex was selected to host the Third Eurovision Dance Contest, which has been postponed indefinitely.

== Transportation ==
20 September Metro Station is under construction in this area.

== Notable sporting events ==
- 2007 and 2009 Rhythmic Gymnastics European Championships
- 2005 World Rhythmic Gymnastics Championships
- 2007 FILA Wrestling World Championships
- 2007 European Taekwondo Championships
- 2011 World Amateur Boxing Championships
- 2015 European Games (Judo, wrestling, sambo)
- 2017 Islamic Solidarity Games (Judo, wrestling)
