= 3rd Rifle Division =

3rd Rifle Division can refer to:

- 3rd Carpathian Rifle Division, Poland
- 3rd Guards Motor Rifle Division, Soviet Union
- 3rd Motor Rifle Division, Soviet Union
- 3rd Rifle Division (Soviet Union)
- 3rd Caucasian Rifle Division (Soviet Union)
- 3rd Turkestan Rifle Division (Soviet Union)
- 3rd Siberian Rifle Division

== See also ==
- 3rd Division (disambiguation)
