= Tbilisi Avenue =

Street in Baku, Azerbaijan

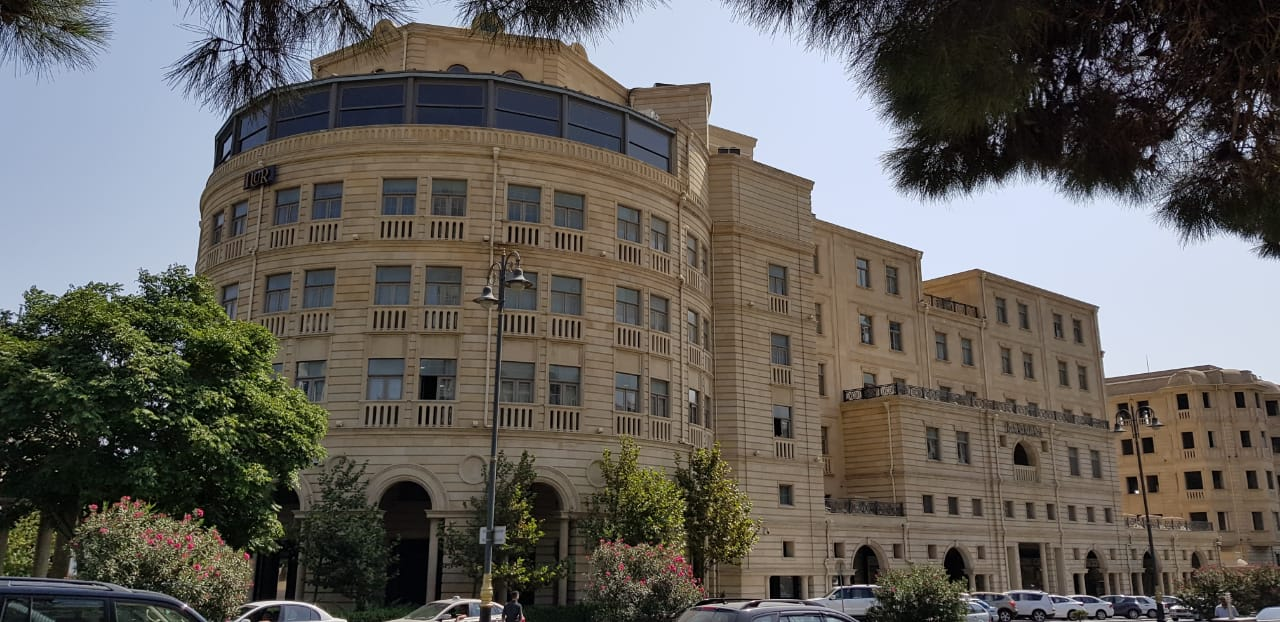
- Maintained by: City of Baku
- Location: Nasimi raion
- south end: Bakikhanov Street
- Major junctions: Jafar Jabbarly Street
- north end: Inshaatchilar Avenue

Tbilisi Avenue (Azerbaijani: Tbilisi prospekti) is an arterial road in the northern part of Baku, the capital of Azerbaijan. It begins at the intersection of Bakikhanov and Jaffar Jabbarly streets and continues north, terminating at 20 January Circle by 20 January metro station.

== Overview ==
The avenue was renamed Tbilisi Avenue from its earlier name, Saray Highway, on September 13, 1963, by the Baku Executive Soviet. Different from its current length, it stretched further to the outskirts of Baku up to the settlement of Khyrdalan just outside Baku and connect to Baku-Quba highway, but that portion of the avenue was renamed to Moscow Avenue on June 14, 2004, by Mayor of Baku Hajibala Abutalybov due to the earlier renaming on that day of a bigger highway leading from central Baku to the Heydar Aliyev International Airport from Moscow Avenue to Heydar Aliyev Avenue. The area is also known for its bitter past when the Soviet Army tanks rolled through Tbilisi Avenue on January 20, 1990 massacring hundreds of civilians on their way with most of them killed at the 20 January Circle.

== Notable buildings and monuments located on the avenue include ==
- Monument to Mehdi Huseynzade
- Ministry of Transport of Azerbaijan Republic
