= Ashur Mosque =

Mosque in Baku, Azerbaijan

- Azerbaijani: Aşur Məscidi; Arabic: مسجد عاشور
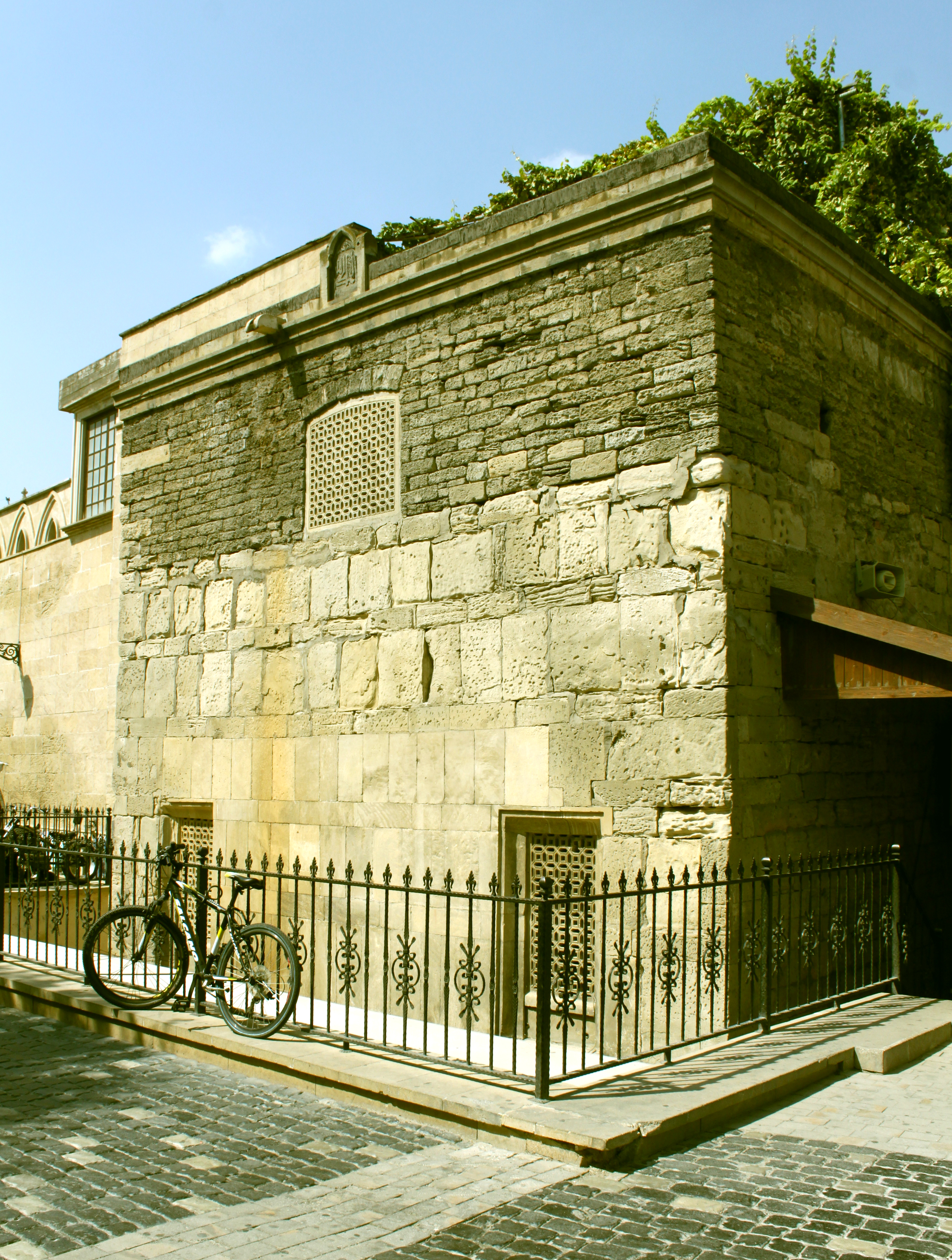
- The mosque in 2014, prior to its forced closure

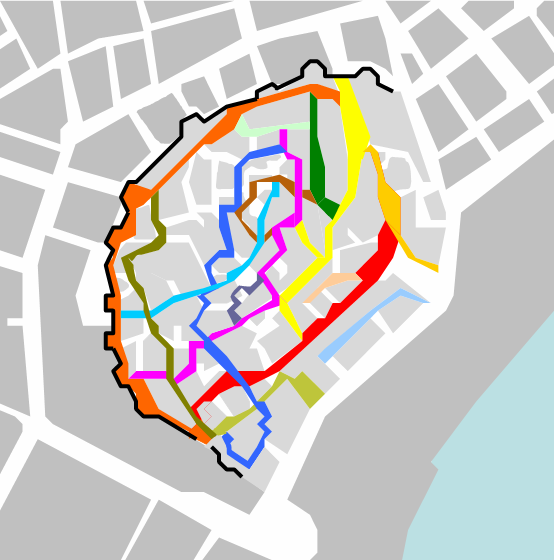
- Location of the former mosque in the Baku Old City

Religion
- Affiliation: Sunni Islam (former)
- Ecclesiastical or organizational status: Mosque
- Status: Closed (since 2016)

Location
- Location: Asaf Zeynalli Street, Baku
- Country: Azerbaijan
- Interactive map of Ashur Mosque
- Coordinates: 40°21′57″N 49°50′11″E

Architecture
- Type: Mosque architecture
- Established: 1169

Specifications
- Length: 14 m (46 ft)
- Width: 11 m (36 ft)
- Materials: Stone

The Ashur Mosque (Azerbaijani: Aşur Məscidi), also known as the Lezgi Mosque (Arabic: مسجد عاشور), is a Sunni Islam mosque in the Old City of Baku, Azerbaijan. It was founded in 1169 by the master Najaf Ashur son of Ibrahim. It is located in Asaf Zeynalli Street. The mosque was closed for repairs in 2016 and as of December 2024, the mosque remains closed.

== Overview ==
The mosque is frequently called the ‘Lezgin Mosque’. The second name of the mosque is connected with the oil boom of the 19th century. As a result of this event, a large inflow of labour was observed in Baku, including from Dagestan. This mosque was used by Lezgin workers during religious ceremonies.

The shape of the Ashura Mosque is parallelepiped. There are two small windows on the southern face of the building. The entrance of the mosque is small and arch-shaped, which leads to the single chamber prayer room. The two-storey structure measures 14 m × 11 m (46 ft × 36 ft). The construction highlights its antiquity and restructuring from the ancient fire temple. Overlapping is vaulted. The entrance is arranged in the north-eastern part in the form of a pointed arch and leads to a wide, singlechamber prayer hall. There are two openings with a semicircular arch facing outwards. Among the distinctive features – there are two mihrabs in the mosque: one is arranged along the axis of the hall and is divided into two sections by an arched belt, another one is a dome-shaped stalactite mihrab in a corner. Both are richly decorated.

In 1970, the mosque underwent restoration works and after reconstruction archaeological excavations discovered two semicircular arches belong to the Sassanids period in Azerbaijan. These findings are in the southern part of the mosque building.

In the lead up to the Baku 2015 European Games, there was significant pressure from Government authorities for the mosque to close, including arresting the imam. In July 2016, the mosque was ordered to close for repairs, and as of December 2024, the mosque remains closed.

== See also ==
- Islam in Azerbaijan
- List of mosques in Azerbaijan
- List of mosques in Baku
