= Eldar Azizov =

Head of the Executive Branch of the city of Baku

- Eldar Əzizov
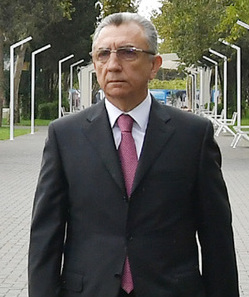
- Azizov in 2019

6th Mayor of Baku
- Incumbent
- Assumed office November 15, 2018
- Preceded by: Hajibala Abutalybov

4th Mayor of Sabail
- In office September 2, 2015 – July 16, 2018
- Preceded by: Asif Asgarov
- Succeeded by: Vugar Zeynalov

13th Mayor of Sumqayit
- In office February 18, 2011 – November 2, 2015
- Preceded by: Vagif Aliyev
- Succeeded by: Zakir Farajov

8th Mayor of Ganja
- In office April 8, 2003 – February 18, 2011
- Preceded by: Eyvaz Babayev
- Succeeded by: Elmar Valiyev

8th Mayor of Nizami
- In office June 28, 2000 – April 8, 2003
- Preceded by: Eldar Azimov
- Succeeded by: Abidin Farzaliyev

Personal details
- Born: 28 June 1957 (age 69) Baku, Azerbaijan SSR, Soviet Union
- Party: New Azerbaijan Party
- Children: 2
- Education: Azerbaijan State University

Eldar Aziz oghlu Azizov (Azerbaijani: Eldar Əziz oğlu Əzizov) is an Azerbaijani politician who has served as mayor of multiple cities. He served as mayor of Nizami raion from 2000 to 2003, Ganja from 2003 to 2011, Sumgait from 2011 to 2015, Sabail raion from 2015 to 2018, and Baku since 2018.

== Early life ==
Azizov Eldar Aziz oglu was born in Baku, Azerbaijan SSR, Soviet Union, on 28 June 1957. He graduated from the Azerbaijan State University in 1979.

== Career ==
=== Azerbaijan SSR ===
Azizov worked as the first secretary of the Komsomol Committee of the 26th district of Baku. He became the first secretary of the Baku City Committee in 1987. He became secretary of the Central Committee of the Azerbaijan Komsomol in 1989. In 1991, he became secretary of the Central Committee of the Youth Union of Azerbaijan

Azizov was elected to the Supreme Soviet of Azerbaijan in 1990.

=== Mayor ===
In 2000, Azizov was appointed mayor of Nizami raion. He served as mayor of Ganja from 2003 to 2011, Sumgait from 2011 to 2015, mayor of Sabail raion from 2015 to 2018, and mayor of Baku since 2018.

Azizov has been accused of culling the stray dogs of Baku by the International Organization for Animal Protection. He ordered multiple large cakes in honour of the birthday of President Ilham Aliyev; his cake in 2012 included 21,960 eggs, 1,800 kilograms of sugar, and 700 kilograms of hazelnut and crushed walnuts.

== Personal life ==
Azizov is a member of the Union of Journalists of Azerbaijan and has written over 200 articles. Azizov received the Order of the Badge of Honour in 1980, and the Order "For Merit to the Fatherland" in 2017.

Azizov is married and is the father of two children.

== Works cited ==
- "Day of Cities". United Nations Economic Commission for Europe. 8 April 2019. Archived from the original on 1 November 2019.
- "The Head of the Executive Power". Baku. Archived from the original on 10 November 2026.
