= Sanan Alizade =

Azerbaijani politician

- Sənan Əlizadə

1st Mayor of Baku
- In office 1990–1993
- Succeeded by: Rauf Gulmammadov

Personal details
- Born: May 6, 1943 Baku, Azerbaijan
- Died: 31 January 2008 (aged 64) Baku, Azerbaijan
- Education: Azerbaijan State Oil Academy

Sanan Alizade (Azerbaijani: Sənan Əlizadə; 6 May 1943 – 31 January 2008) was an Azerbaijani politician and first Mayor of Baku, capital of Azerbaijan Republic. Alizade had served as the Head of the State Oil Company of Azerbaijan Republic and the Mayor of Baku from 1990 until 1993, when he was replaced by Rafael Allahverdiyev. Alizade was a proponent of moving the capital or at least some of the government institutions, such as the Presidential Administration, Cabinet of Ministers and other main bodies to Pirallahi Island which had the necessary infrastructure or to the cities of Shirvan (city) (former Ali-Bayramly), Saatly, Sabirabad which are in the center of the country, yet close to the current capital, Baku. These regions are in an earthquake- and flood- safe zone.

Sanan Alizade died from a heart attack on 31 January 2008.

== See also ==
- Baku
- Azerbaijan
