= Mirza Alakbar Sabir Garden =

Garden in Baku, Azerbaijan

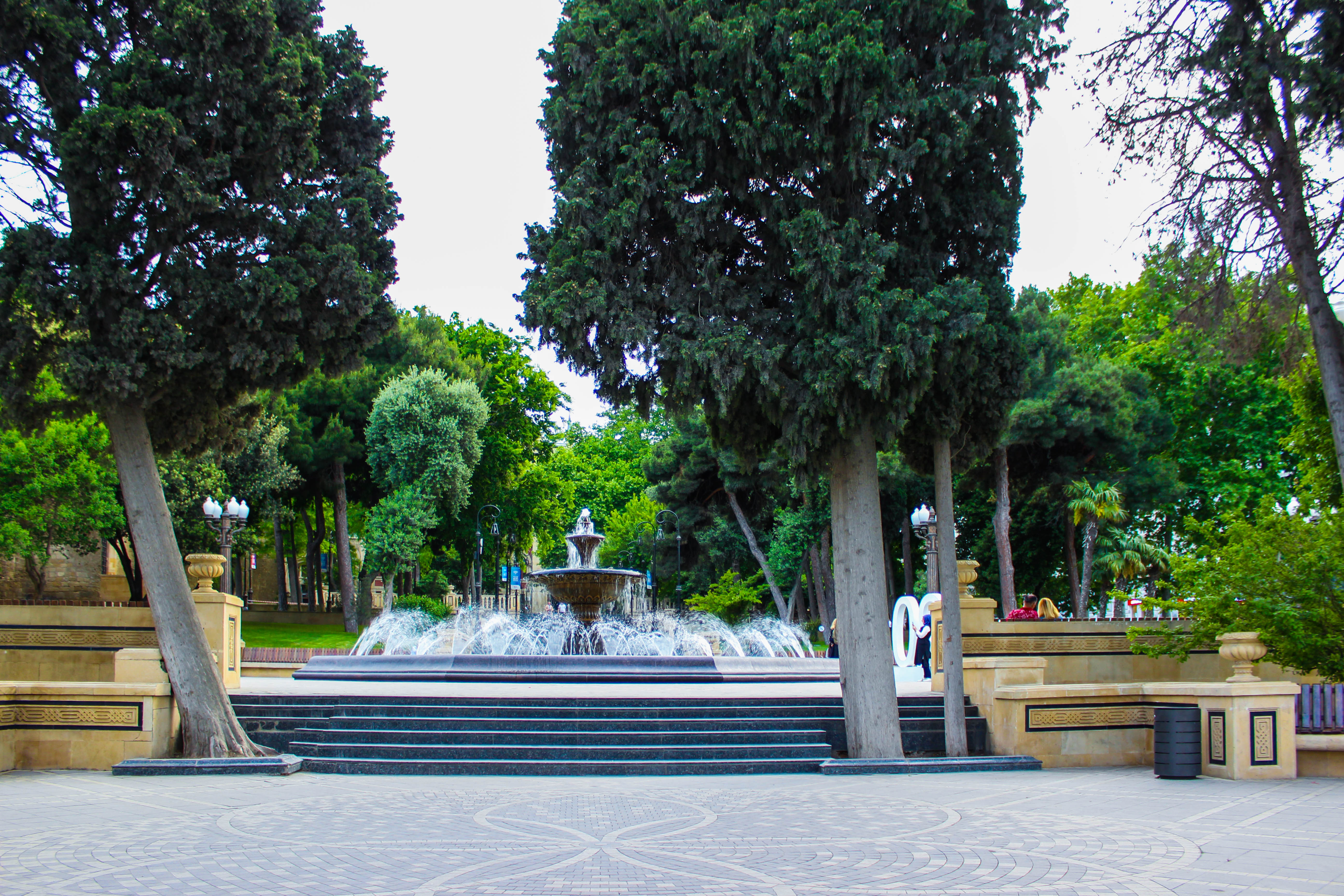
- Interactive map of Mirza Alakbar Sabir Garden
- Type: Urban park
- Location: Baku, Azerbaijan
- Coordinates: 40°22′08″N 49°50′06″E
- Created: 1922
- Status: Open all year

Mirza Alakbar Sabir Garden (or simply Sabir's Garden) is one of the gardens located in the Sabail district of Baku. The garden named after the famous Azerbaijani satirical poet Mirza Alakbar Sabir. It is bordered by the fortress wall of the Icheri Sheher in the south, Istiglaliyyat Street in the north, the Constitutional Court in the east, and the Institute of Manuscripts in the west which known as the Ismailiyya. The statue of Mirza Alakbar Sabir has been erected in the garden.

The garden was erected by the sculptor H.Aleskerov in the area of "Kaspi" publishing house in the 20s of the last century. The formation of the garden took place gradually. A statue of Sabir was erected near the fortress wall in 1922. In the 50s, the area of the park considerably expanded, the garden landscaped and greened. In this regard, putting a new and monumental statue to the poet was actualized. In 1958, the sculptor Jalal Garyaghdi, architects H. Alizadeh and E. Ismayilov worked together on the statue. The statue was placed in the center of the garden. Historical monuments around the garden are also of great importance. In recent years, the park has been renovated.
