= Araltobe =

Araltobe Аралтобе
- Location within Kazakhstan
- Coordinates: 50°10′24″N 60°10′58″E
- Country: Kazakhstan
- Region: Aktobe
- Elevation: 226 m (741 ft)
- Time zone: UTC+5 (West Kazakhstan Time)
  - Summer (DST): UTC+5 (West Kazakhstan Time)

Araltobe (Kazakh: Аралтөбе, Araltöbe; Russian: Аралтобе, Araltobe) is a town in Aktobe Region, west Kazakhstan. It lies at an altitude of 226 m (741 ft).
