= Rafael Allahverdiyev =

Azerbaijani politician (1945–2009)

- Rəfael Allahverdiyev

4th Mayor of Baku
- In office 3 July 1993 – 16 October 2000
- Preceded by: Rauf Gulmammadov
- Succeeded by: Muhammed Abbasov

Personal details
- Born: 9 May 1945 Baku, Azerbaijan SSR, Soviet Union
- Died: 11 January 2009 (aged 63) Baku, Azerbaijan
- Party: Yeni Azərbaycan Partiyası (YAP)
- Education: Azerbaijan National Academy of Sciences; Western University, Baku
- Occupation: business manager, politician

Rafael Khanali oglu Allahverdiyev (Azerbaijani: Rəfael Xanəli oğlu Allahverdiyev) (9 May 1945 – 11 January 2009) was an Azerbaijani politician, co-founder of the New Azerbaijan Party and the second Mayor of Baku, capital of Azerbaijan.

Allahverdiyev was born to a family of an oil worker in Baku. He had graduated from Azerbaijan National Academy of Sciences in 1974 and from Western University in 1994 with a degree in management.

In earlier years, he had worked as an operator at the Garadagneft oil refinery. In 1971 through 1983, he held various positions at the Central Committee of Azerbaijan Communist Party. From 1983 until 1988, Allahverdiyev served as the head of executive power of Narimanov district of Baku, and from 1988 to 1993, as the director of operations of International Bank of Azerbaijan.

From 1993 until 2000, Allahverdiyev served as the mayor of Baku until he was replaced by the incumbent mayor Hajibala Abutalybov. He was considered a close long-term ally of former president Heydar Aliyev. During his term, he also co-founded the New Azerbaijan Party, currently the ruling party of Azerbaijani government, and was subsequently elected as the deputy chairman of the party. In 1995, Rafael Allahverdiyev was also elected to the Parliament of Azerbaijan in 1995, serving two consecutive terms, but gave up his parliament membership shortly thereafter, splitting with the incumbent government and being exiled to Switzerland in 2000.

Allahverdiyev suffered from a long illness and died on 11 January 2009 from brain cancer.

== See also ==
- Baku
- Azerbaijan
