= Monument to Koroghlu =

Sculpture by Tokay Mammadov

- Azerbaijani: Koroğlu heykəli
- Interactive map of Monument to Koroghlu
- Location: Jafar Jabbarli square, Baku, Azerbaijan
- Coordinates: 40°23′30″N 49°50′33″E
- Designer: Tokay Mammadov
- Material: bronze
- Length: 23 m.
- Opening date: February 21, 2012
- Dedicated to: Koroghlu

The Monument to Koroghlu (Azerbaijani: Koroğlu heykəli) commemorates the central character of the Epic of Koroghlu. It is located in Baku, Azerbaijan at the intersection of Azadlig and Vagif avenues, in a park bearing the hero's name. The monument was raised on the site of the monument to Prokofy Dzhaparidze, which was dismantled in 2009.

The author of the monument is Tokay Mammadov, the Peoples Artist of Azerbaijan. The order to raise a monument to Koroghlu in Baku was issued in 2009. The monument's unveiling took place on 21 February 2012. The opening ceremony was attended by the President of the Republic of Azerbaijan, Ilham Aliyev.

== See also ==
- Aliagha Vahid Monument
- Mustafa Kemal Atatürk Monument, Baku
- Wolfgang Amadeus Mozart monument, Baku
