= 28 May Street =

Road in Baku, Azerbaijan

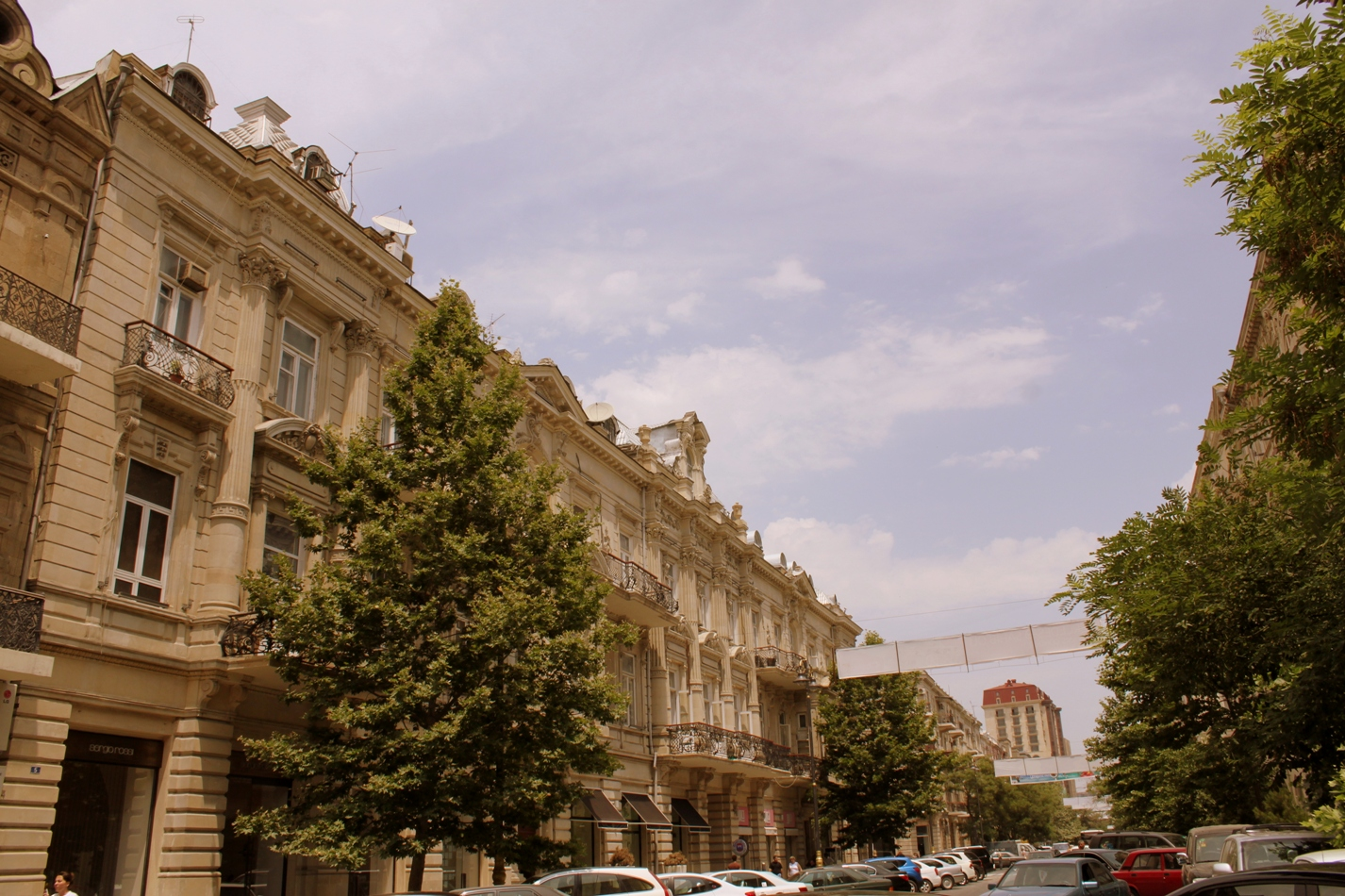
- Interactive map of 28 May Street
- Maintained by: City of Baku
- East end: Bulbul Avenue
- West end: Richard Sorge Street

The 28 May Street (Azerbaijani: 28 may küçəsi) is located in the Nəsimi raion of Baku. Beginning at the Bulbul Avenue, it spans about 1 kilometre (0.62 mi) and ends up at Richard Sorge Street. The street, among other names, was known as Telefonnaya (Telephone Street) during the Russian rule, then was renamed to 28 April Street to mark the date of the establishment of Azerbaijan Soviet Socialist Republic. Since 1992 it has been known under the current name, which highlights the date when the Azerbaijan Democratic Republic was declared.

== History ==
Until the middle of the nineteenth century, the area was occupied by farms and orchards that belonged to the residents of Baku. After the construction of the Baku Train Station in 1883, there arose a need in a paved road that would connect the station with the city. In 1887, the first telephone exchange in Baku was built here. It gave the street its first name, Telefonnaya (Telephone Street). By the end of the nineteenth century, horsecars already ran on the street. The street itself, however, continued to be regarded as a city periphery, home to the urban poor and beggars, well into the end of the nineteenth century. In 1898, it gained importance due to the construction of the first Lutheran church in Baku. In the early twentieth century, oil magnate Musa Naghiyev had the city's first multi-family residentials built on this street. In 1913, Telefonnaya was renamed to Romanovsky Prospekt (Romanov Avenue) to mark the 300th anniversary of the Romanov rule in the Russian Empire. In 1918, after Azerbaijan became independent from Russia, it was renamed to Lindley Street after Sir William Lindley who had contributed to the infrastructural development of Czar-era Baku. In 1923, after the Bolshevik power was installed in Azerbaijan, the Soviet government decided to get rid of the "bourgeois toponymy" and the street was given the name 28 April (the date of Azerbaijan's sovietisation in 1920). It was gradually built up as one or two-storey courtyard-based buildings gave way to blocks of flats, or were transformed into taller buildings through superstructures. In 1934, two massive identical Stalinist-style buildings were completed at the very beginning of the street, designed by Mikayil Huseynov and Sadikh Dadashov. One of them housed the Nizami Cinema, while the other later became the head office of AzerTaj. In the 1950s, the so-called Soldier Market was removed from the former Yarmarochnaya Square to be replaced by the Samad Vurghun Park, featuring the poet's giant statue at the entrance. In 1967, the underground of the street was traversed by the first metro line, with 28 April station built nearby. In 1991, both the street and the station were renamed to 28 May to mark the anniversary of Azerbaijan's declaration of independence in 1918. Today 28 May Street is one of the largest in the city. The traffic between Bulbul Avenue and Sorge Street is one-way from east to west. The tramway which connected the easternmost part of the street with the Black City was dismantled in the early 2000s.

Among the street's landmarks are the Lutheran Church of the Saviour and Samad Vurgun park. The nearest metro hub is 28 May Station.

== Views and landmarks ==
28 May Street

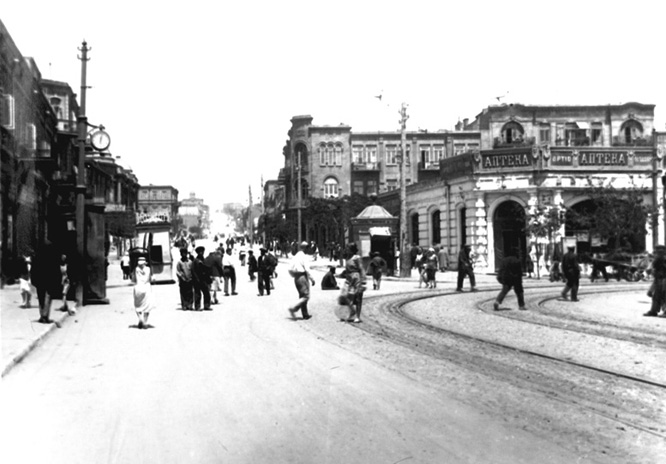
Telefonnaya Street with pharmacy on the right, early 20th century

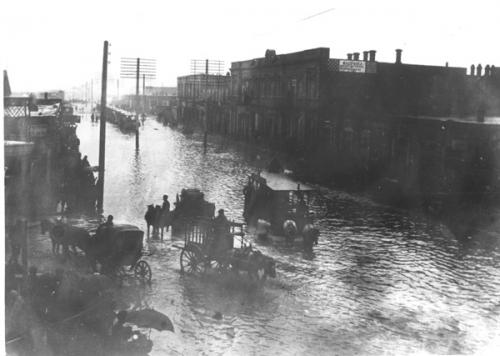
Telefonnaya Street after the rain, 1910

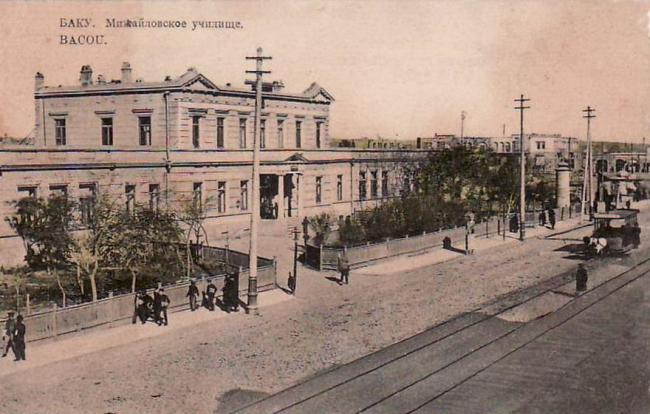
Mikhailovskoe City College, early 20th century

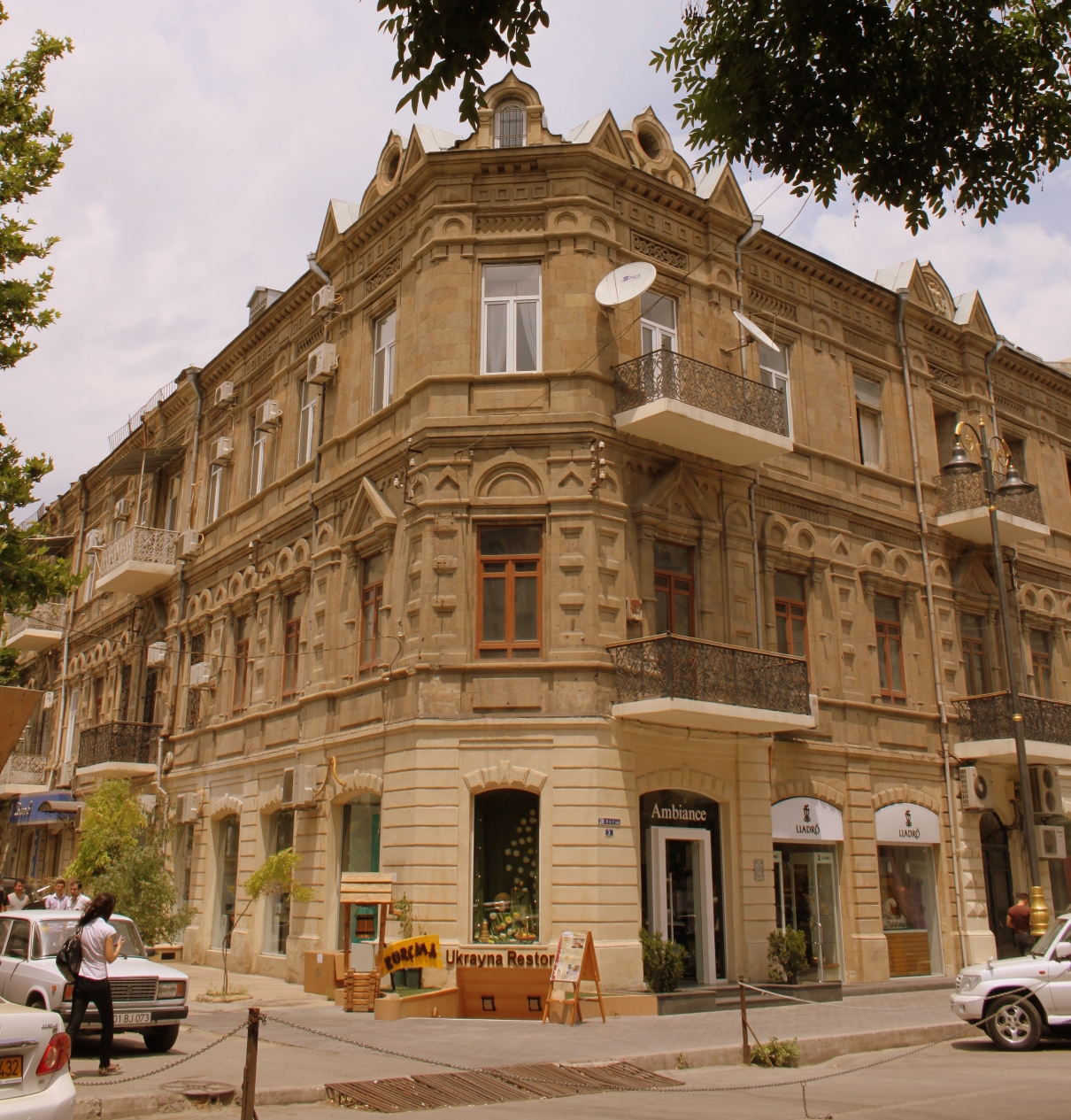
Old mansion, 2010

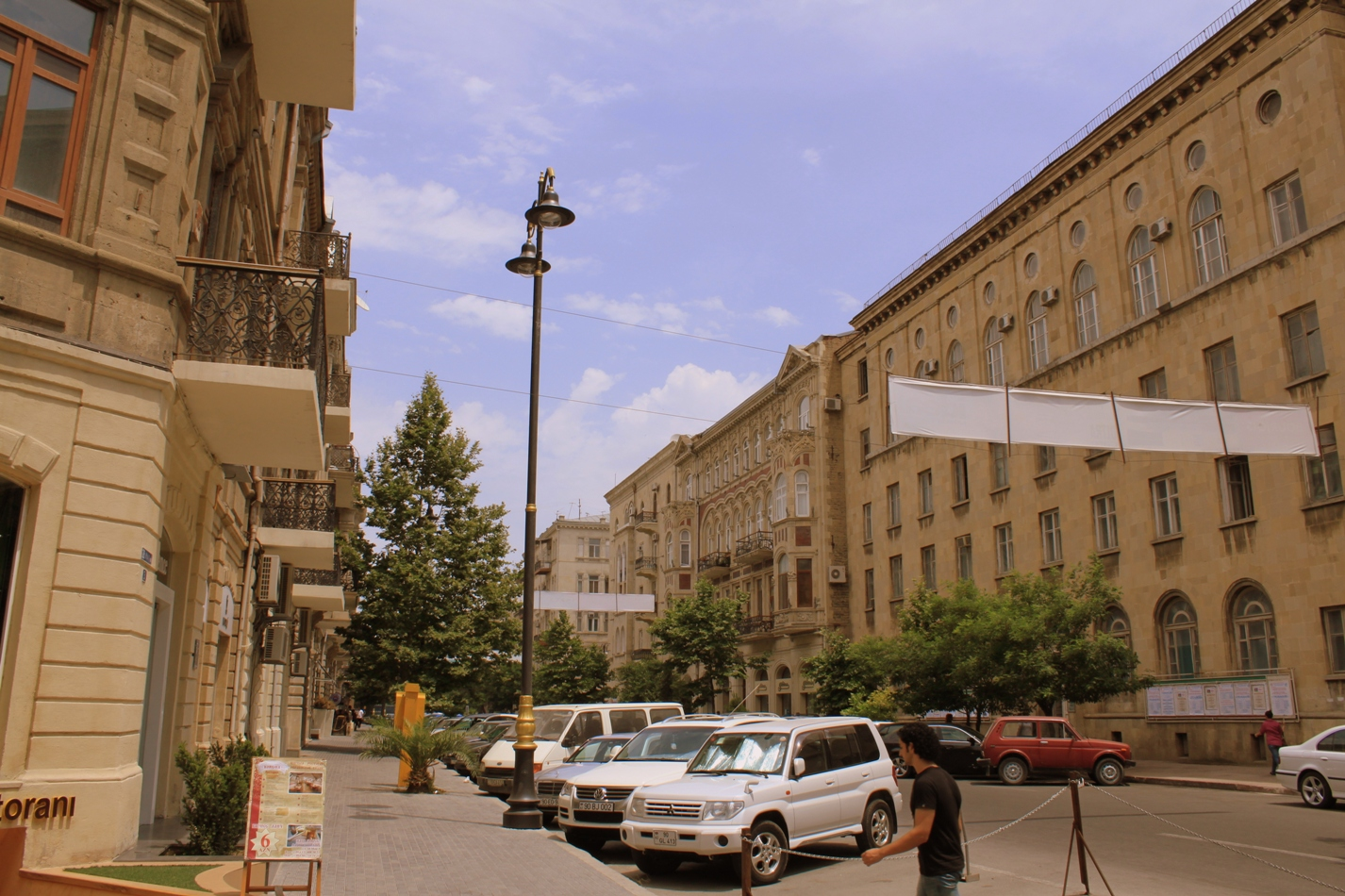
Central part of 28 May Street

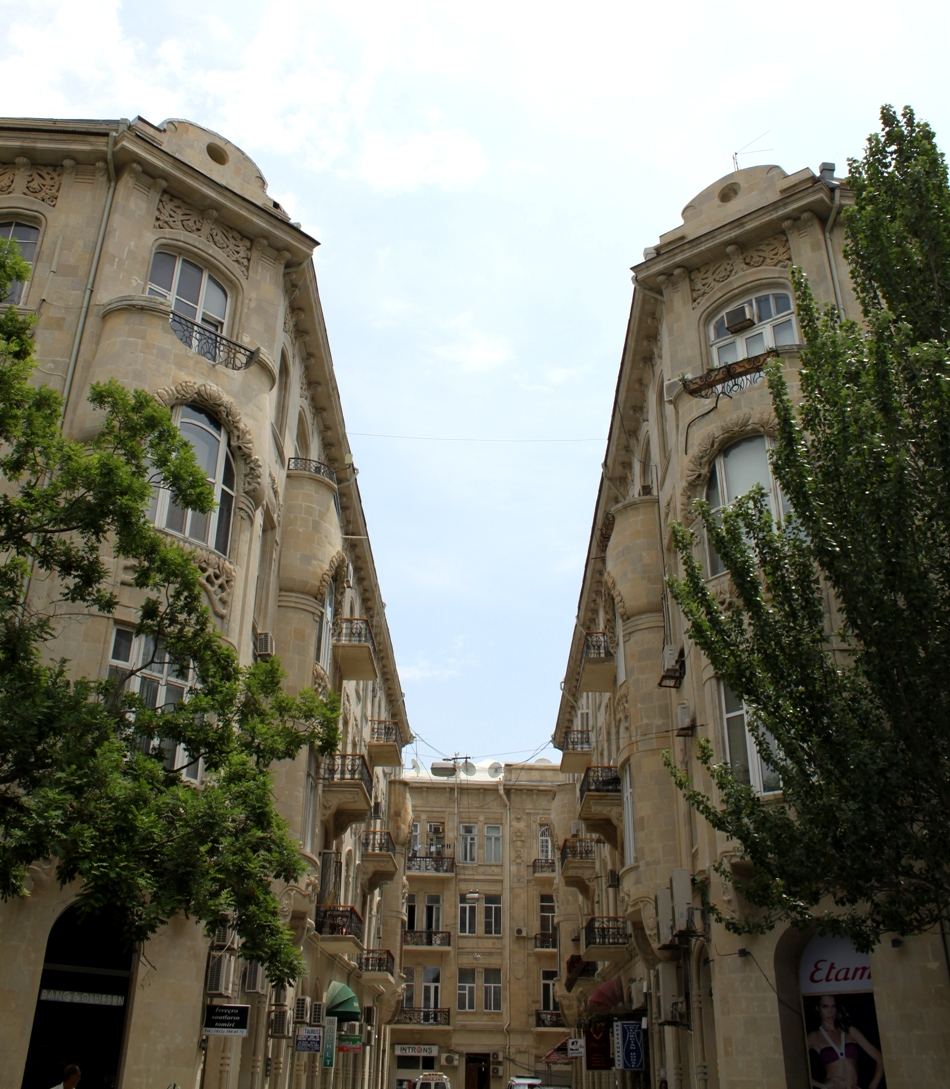
There are many boutiques

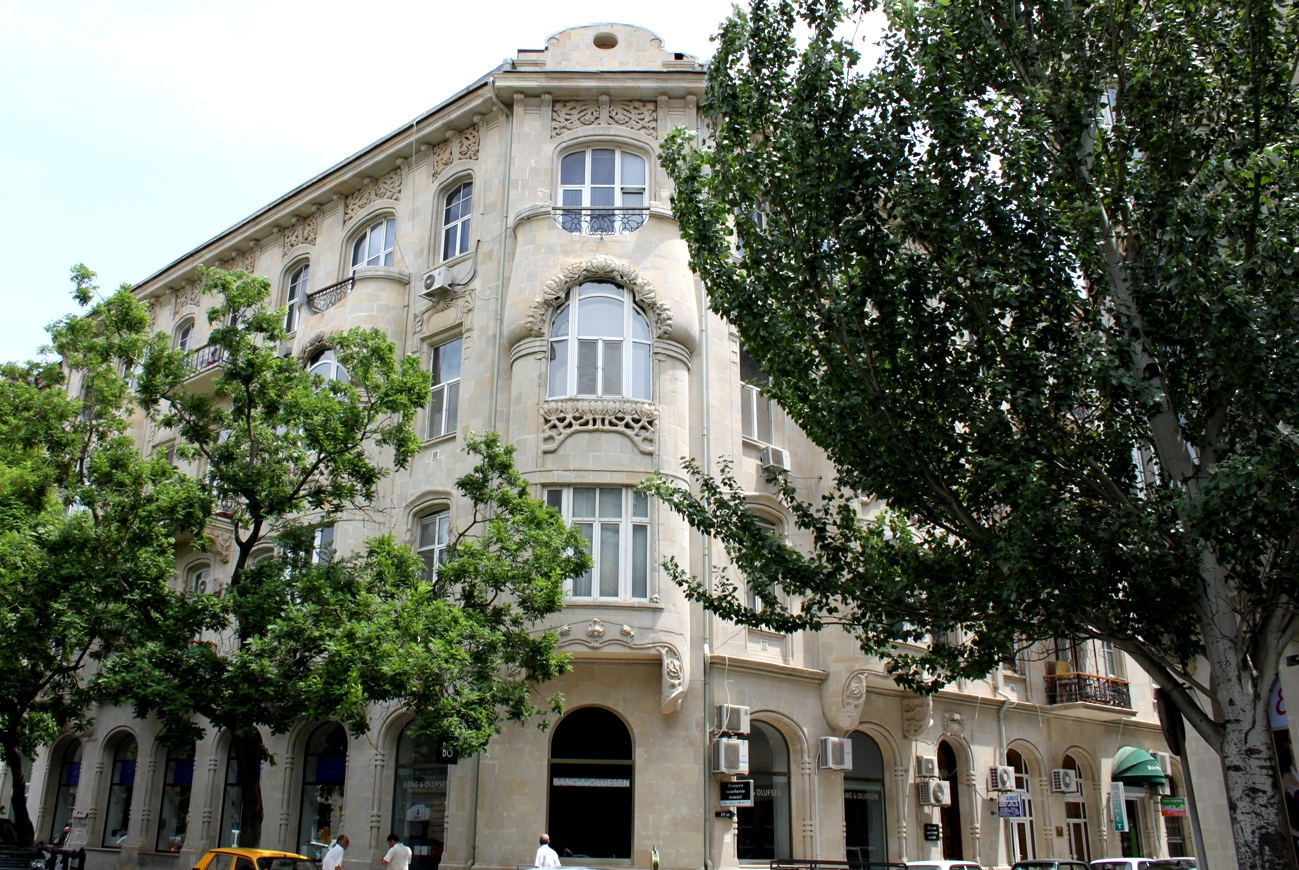
Renovated 19th-century building

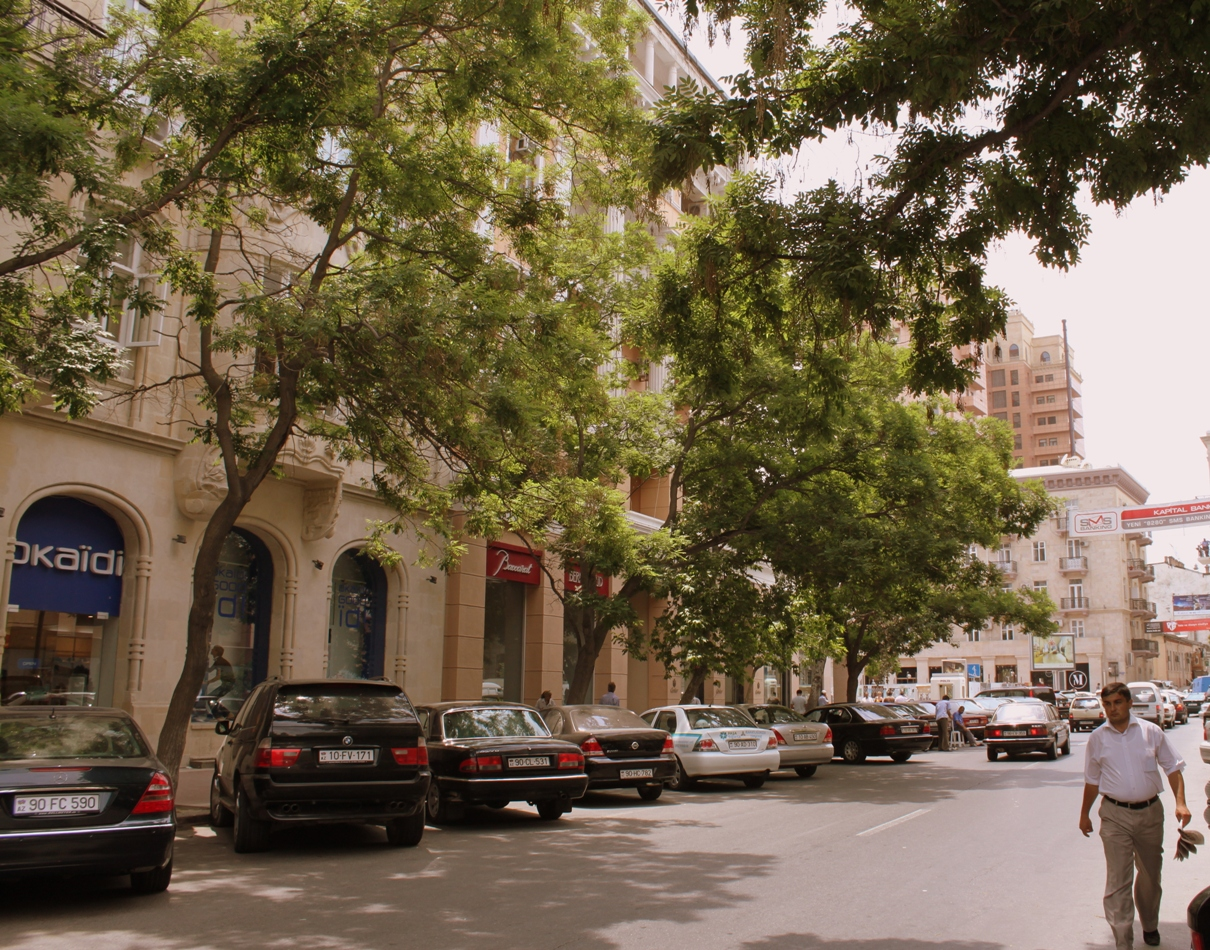
Close to downtown Baku
