= 3rd Siberian Rifle Division =

3rd Siberian Division
- 3-я Сибирская стрелковая дивизия
- Active: ?–1918
- Country: Russian Empire
- Branch: Russian Imperial Army
- Role: Infantry

The 3rd Siberian Rifle Division (Russian: 3-я Сибирская стрелковая дивизия) was an infantry formation of the Russian Imperial Army that fought in World War I. During the Russo-Japanese War, it was officially called the 3rd East Siberian Rifle Division (3-я (Восточно-)Сибирская стрелковая дивизия).

== Order of battle ==
The organization of the division in 1914 was as follows.

- 1st Brigade (HQ Vladivostok)
  - 9th Siberian Rifle Regiment
  - 10th Siberian Rifle Regiment

2nd Brigade (HQ Vladivostok)

  - 11th Siberian Rifle Regiment
  - 12th Siberian Rifle Regiment

3rd Siberian Rifle Artillery Brigade
