= Hajibala Abutalybov =

Azerbaijani politician (born 1944)

- Hacıbala Abutalıbov
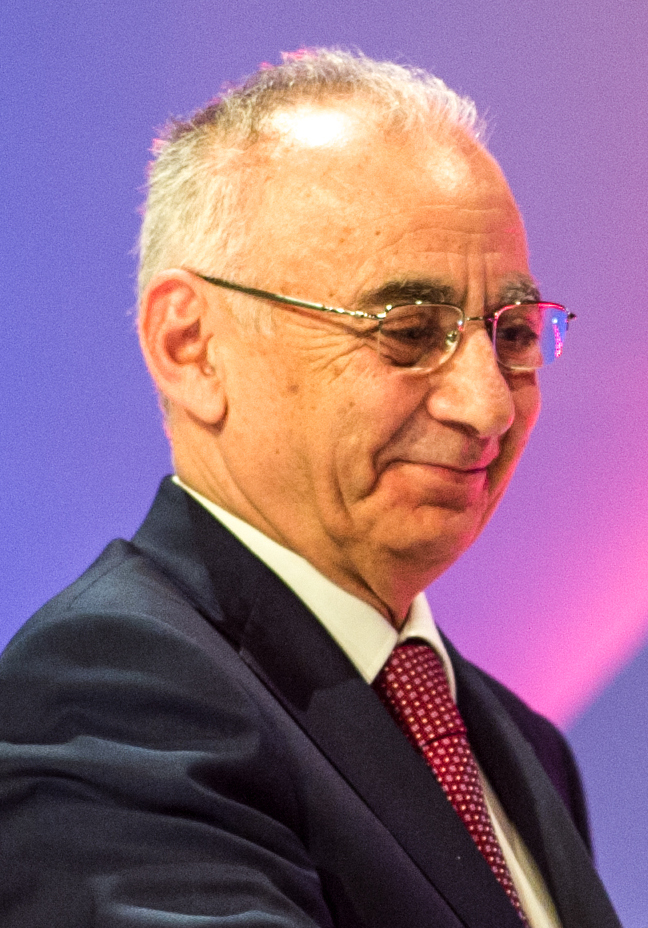
- Abutalybov in 2012

5th Mayor of Baku
- In office 30 January 2001 – 21 April 2018
- Preceded by: Muhammed Abbasov
- Succeeded by: Eldar Azizov

Personal details
- Born: 13 May 1944 (age 82) Krasnovodsk, Turkmen SSR, Soviet Union (now Turkmenistan)
- Party: New Azerbaijan Party
- Children: 2
- Education: Azerbaijan State University; Ioffe Physical-Technical Institute

Hajibala Ibrahim oglu Abutalybov (Azerbaijani: Hacıbala İbrahim oğlu Abutalıbov, born 13 May 1944) is an Azerbaijani politician. He was Mayor of Baku between 2001 and 2018 and deputy prime minister of Azerbaijan from 2018 to October 2019.

== Early life and education ==
Abutalybov was born in Kyzyl-Su, Turkmenistan. He graduated from Azerbaijan State University with a degree in Physics in 1965. In 1969, he was enrolled in post graduate program at Ioffe Physical-Technical Institute of the Russian Academy of Sciences in Saint Petersburg, Russia. In 1976, he received his PhD and defended his doctoral desertation in 1987.

== Career ==
Abutalybov served as the head of the laboratory at Physics Department of Azerbaijan National Academy of Sciences in 1995. Same year, he was appointed the Head of the Executive Power of Surakhani district of Baku which he held until 1999. In 2000, he was appointed Deputy Prime Minister of Azerbaijan.

Abutalybov served as Mayor of Baku for 17 years, between 30 January 2001 and 2018.

== Personal life ==
Abutalybov is married and has two sons.
