= Murtuza Mukhtarov Mosque =

Mosque in Amirjan, Azerbaijan

Murtuza Mosque
- Azerbaijani: Murtuza Muxtarov Məscidi; Arabic: مسجد مورتوزى موختاروف
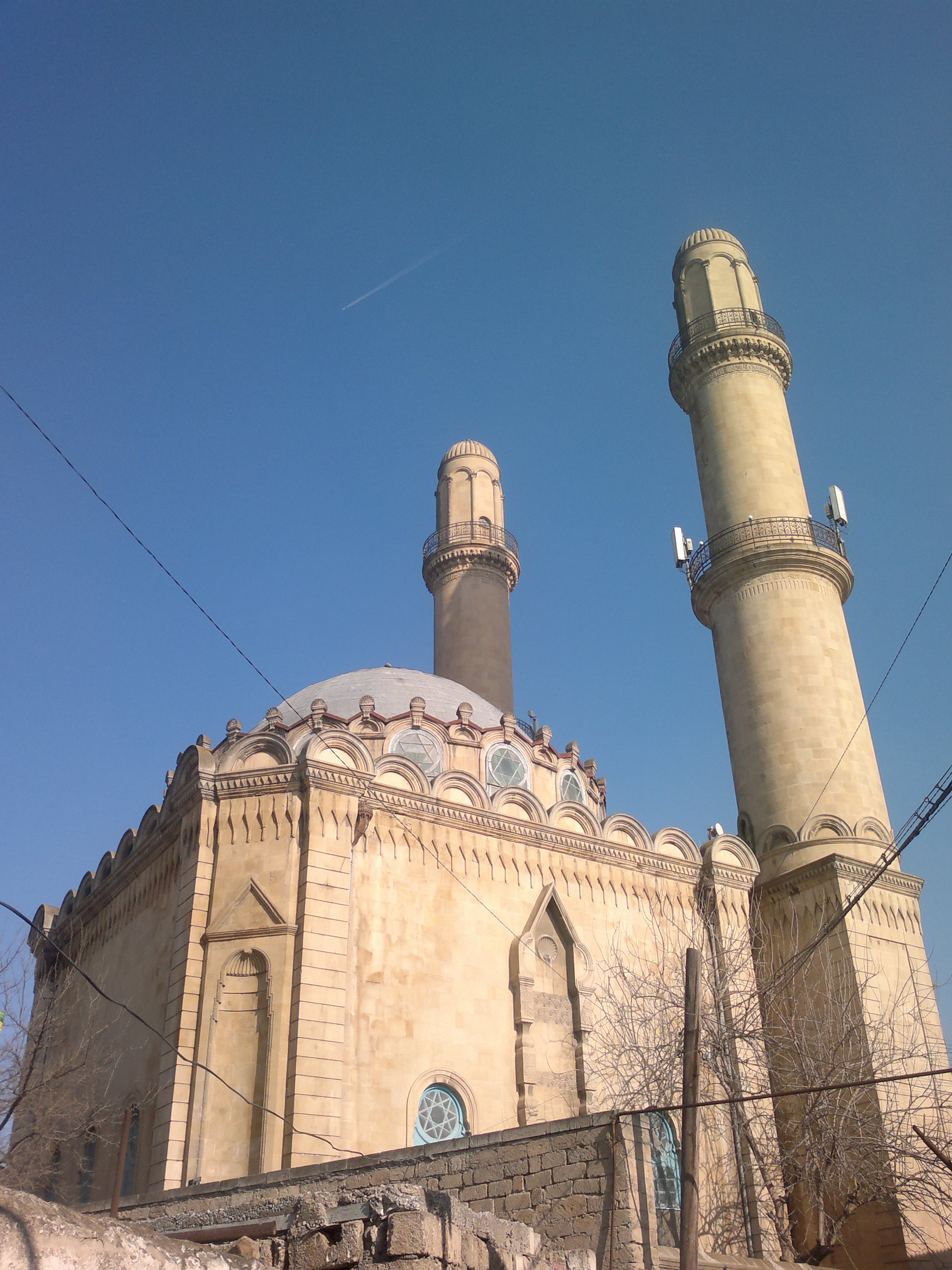
- The mosque in 2015

- Location of the mosque in Azerbaijan

Religion
- Affiliation: Islam
- Ecclesiastical or organizational status: Mosque (1908–1928); Profane use (1928–1989); Mosque (since 1989)
- Status: Active

Location
- Location: Amirjan
- Country: Azerbaijan
- Interactive map of Murtuza Mosque
- Coordinates: 40°25′19″N 49°59′07″E

Architecture
- Architect: Zivar bay Ahmadbayov
- Type: Mosque architecture
- Funded by: Murtuza Mukhtarov
- Completed: 1908

Specifications
- Minaret: Two
- Minaret height: 47 m (154 ft)
- Materials: Stone

The Murtuza Mukhtarov Mosque (Azerbaijani: Murtuza Muxtarov Məscidi; Arabic: مسجد مورتوزى موختاروف) is a mosque in the village of Amirjan near Baku, Azerbaijan.

== History ==
Local residents began construction of the mosque in 1901; however, it was suspended due to a shortage of materials. They then sought financial assistance from Murtuza Mukhtarov, who hired several architects, including the chief architect Zivar bay Ahmadbayov, and covered all construction costs. The construction took eight years and was completed in 1908.

Mukhtarov donated a 25 kg (55 lb) Quran adorned with golden Arabic calligraphy to the mosque as a special gift.

During Soviet rule in Azerbaijan, the mosque was used as a carpet weaving workshop. Between 1985 and 1989, it served as an exhibition hall for the works of Azerbaijani artist Sattar Bahlulzade. Since 1989, the building has functioned once again as a mosque.

The mosque has two minarets, each 47 m (154 ft) tall and containing 140 steps. It also includes a prayer room for women. Murtuza Mukhtarov’s grave is located in the mosque’s courtyard. On both the right and left sides of the mosque, there is an inscription engraved in Arabic letters that, translated into English, reads: "Greeting to the prophets".

== See also ==
- Mukhtarov Mosque
- Islam in Azerbaijan
- List of mosques in Azerbaijan
- List of mosques in Baku
