= Zeynalov =

Zeynalov is a surname. Notable people with the surname include:

- Eldaniz Zeynalov (1927–2001), Azerbaijani actor
- Mahir Zeynalov (born 1970), Azerbaijani journalist
- Marif Zeynalov (born 1934), Azerbaijani geologist
- Ruslan Zeynalov (born 1982), Ukrainian footballer
- Sabir Zeynalov (born 2005), Azerbaijani para taekwondo practitioner
- Zeynal Zeynalov (footballer) (born 1979), Azerbaijani footballer
- Zeynal Zeynalov (1876–1935), Azerbaijani politician of Talysh descent
