= Akhund Abuturab Mausoleum =

Azerbaijani nationally significant historical-architectural monument

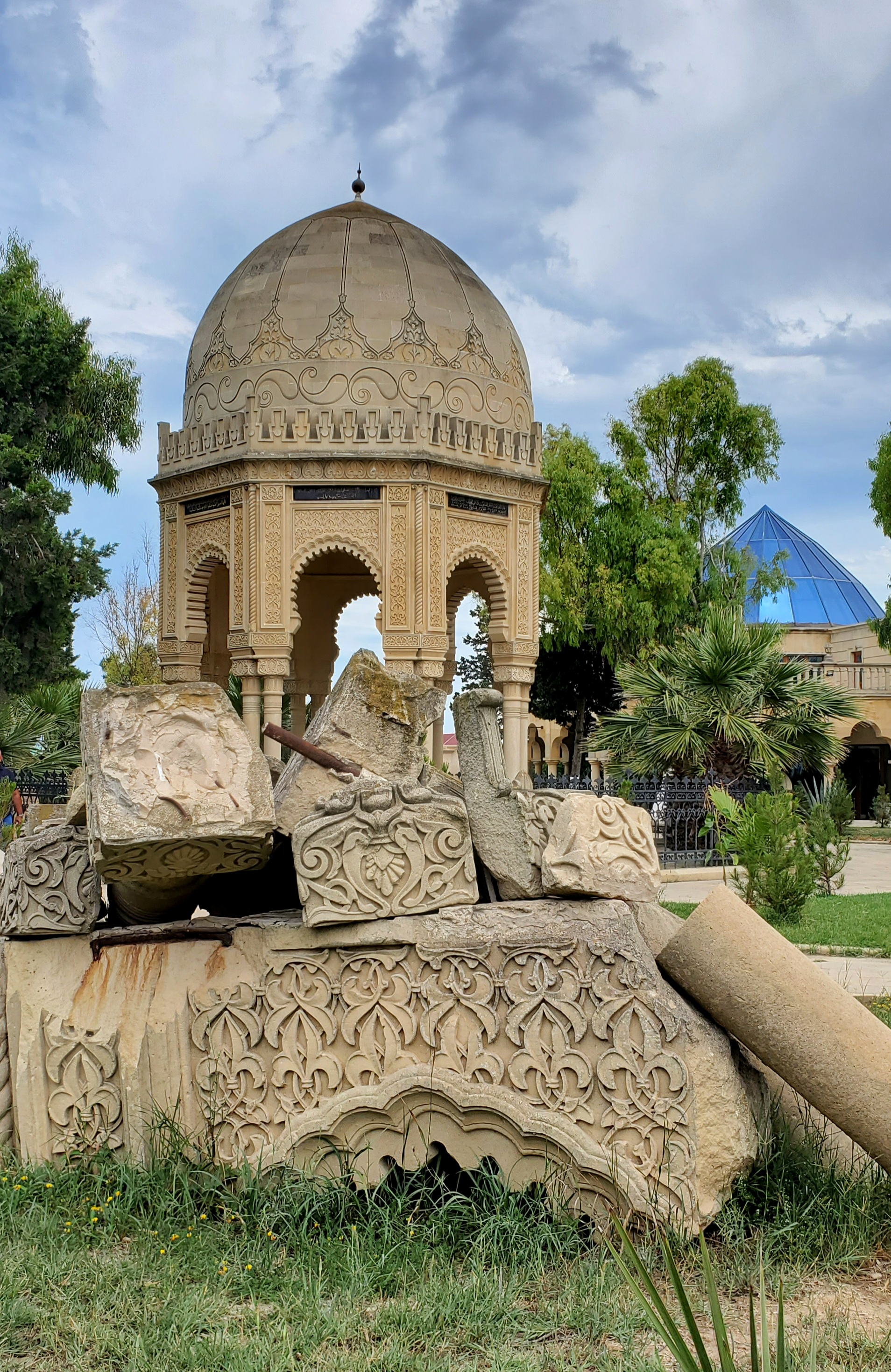
- Interactive map of Akhund Abuturab Mausoleum
- Location: Baku

History
- Built: 1908

Site notes
- Area: Khazar raion, Mardakan, st. Ramin Gasımov

Akhund Abuturab Mausoleum is a nationally significant historical-architectural monument in Azerbaijan, located in the settlement of Mardakan and dating back to 1908.

The mausoleum was included in the list of nationally significant immovable historical and cultural monuments by Decision No. 132 of the Cabinet of Azerbaijan on August 2, 2001.

== About ==
Mirza Abu Turab Akhundzadeh was born in 1817 in the village of Amirjan, near Baku. He received his initial education in Baku at the madrasa of Mirza Hasib Qudsi. He later continued his studies in Medina and Baghdad. He was fluent in Arabic, Persian, Turkish, and Russian. On Abu Turab's initiative, the first girls’ madrasa in the village of Amirjan was established. He published various articles in the "Hayat" newspaper. He died in 1908 and was buried in Mardakan. That same year, a mausoleum was erected over Mirza Abu Turab Akhundzadeh's grave at the order of Murtuza Mukhtarov, based on a design by Iosif Ploshko. The mausoleum is located in the Pir Hasan cemetery.

The octagonal-shaped mausoleum was built in the traditional layout characteristic of medieval Azerbaijani mausoleums. It stands on eight paired columns. The structure's volume is designed in the form of a pavilion and is topped with a dome.

Inside and around the mausoleum, there are a total of four sarcophagus-type gravestones. The stone-carved and ornamented sarcophagus in the center of the mausoleum belongs to Mirza Abu Turab Akhundzadeh, while the sarcophagus placed at his feet belongs to philanthropist and millionaire Haji Zeynalabdin Taghiyev. On September 4, 1924, in accordance with his will, the millionaire was buried at the foot of Mirza Abu Turab Akhundzadeh's grave (the lower part of the tomb). After her death, Taghiyev's daughter, Sara Khanum, was also buried next to her father in 1991. Additionally, there is a symbolic gravestone on the mausoleum grounds for Sara Taghiyeva's husband, Zeynal Salimkhanov, who was a victim of repression. Since his burial place is unknown, the gravestone is symbolic.

During an engineering study in 1987, it was discovered that the metal pipes inside the stone columns had corroded. That same year, reinforcement work was carried out on the monument.

After Azerbaijan regained its independence, the mausoleum was included in the list of nationally significant immovable historical and cultural monuments by Decision No. 132 of the Cabinet of Azerbaijan on August 2, 2001.

In 2003, due to the mausoleum falling into disrepair, the metal pipes were removed, the reinforced concrete dome was dismantled, the structure was clad in stone, and new plant motifs were added. Some of the original stones and columns belonging to the mausoleum are now displayed on the site as exhibits.
