= Ramana Mosque =

Mosque in Ramana, Azerbaijan

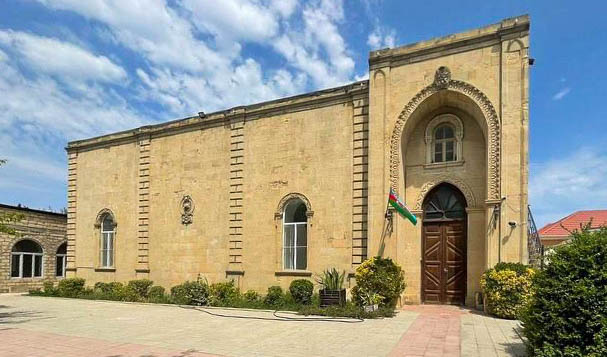
- Interactive map of Ramana Mosque
- Location: Veli Veliyev Street, 55.

History
- Built: 1912-1914 years

Site notes
- Area: Baku Ramana, Azerbaijan
- Architect: Zivar bay Ahmadbayov

The Ramana Mosque, also known as the Qurban Mosque, is a historical and architectural monument built between 1912 and 1914. It is located in the settlement of Ramana, Azerbaijan, and was designed by architect Zivar bay Ahmadbeyov.

By decision No. 132 of the Cabinet of Ministers of the Republic of Azerbaijan, dated August 2, 2001, the mosque was included in the list of immovable historical and cultural monuments of local significance.

== About ==
The Ramana Mosque was built in 1912–1913 in the settlement of Ramana. Its architect was Zivar bay Ahmadbeyov.

After the Soviet occupation, Azerbaijan officially launched a campaign against religion in 1928. Many mosques, churches, and synagogues were repurposed as educational or cultural clubs. While there were about 3,000 mosques in Azerbaijan in 1917**, this number dropped to 1,700 by 1927, 1,369 by 1928, and only 17 by 1933. During this period, the Ramana Mosque ceased functioning as a place of worship and its building was used as a workshop.

After Azerbaijan regained its independence, the mosque was returned to the religious community. On August 2, 2001, by Decision No. 132 of the Cabinet of Ministers of the Republic of Azerbaijan, the Ramana Mosque was included in the list of immovable historical and cultural monuments of local significance.

== Architecture ==
The mosque is located in the historical center of the village, surrounded by ancient houses and a bathhouse. According to its plan, the mosque consists of two square-shaped prayer halls. The main prayer hall measures 14 × 14 meters. The structure includes the main hall, a corridor, and auxiliary rooms situated on the north and east sides of the hall. The ceiling of the main hall rests on four columns made of hewn limestone. All doors and windows are framed with decorative borders, and the portal reaches a height of 7–9 meters. The total area of the mosque is 300 square meters, accommodating up to 300 worshippers at once. The mosque has one dome and no minaret.

== Pictures ==
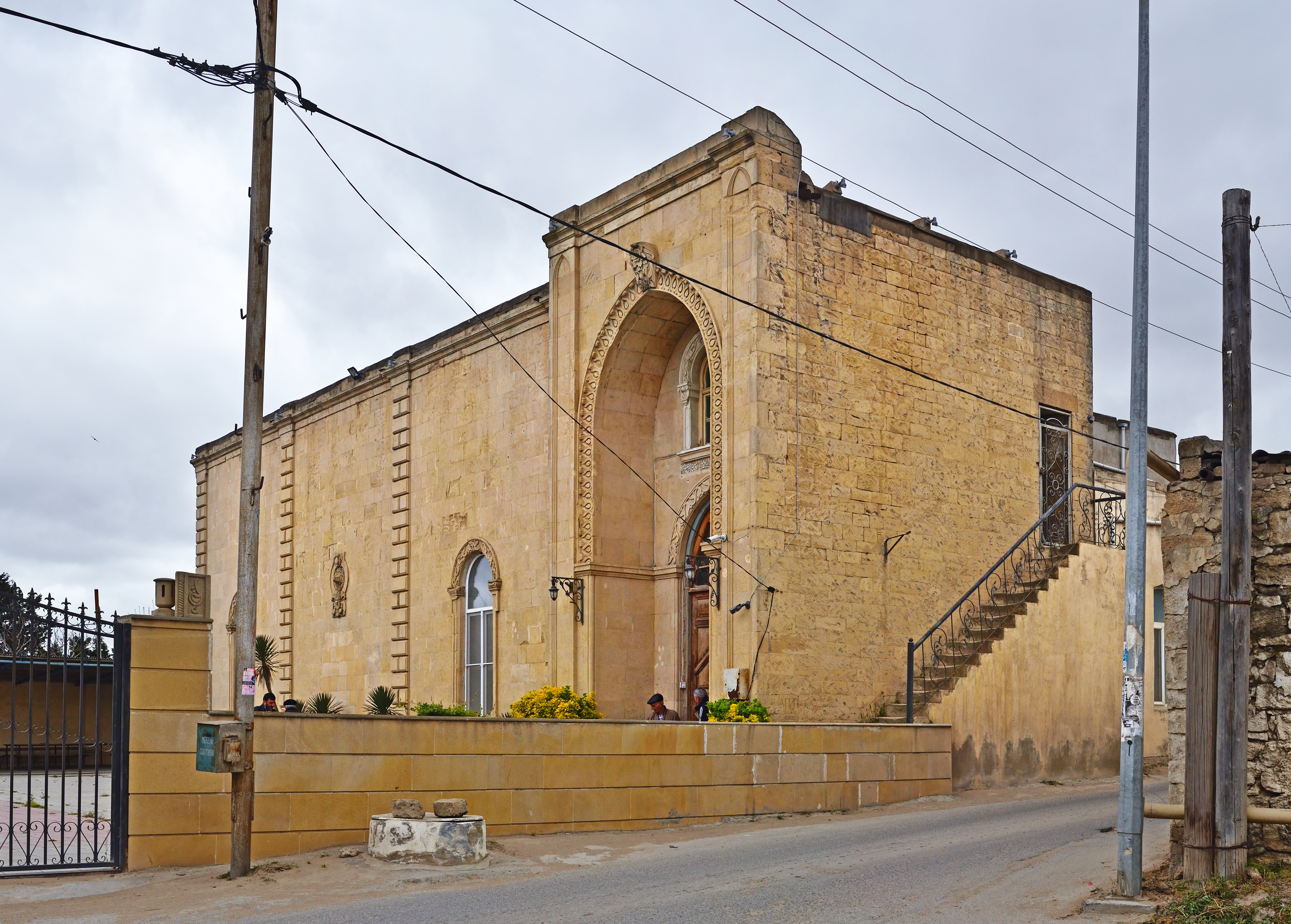

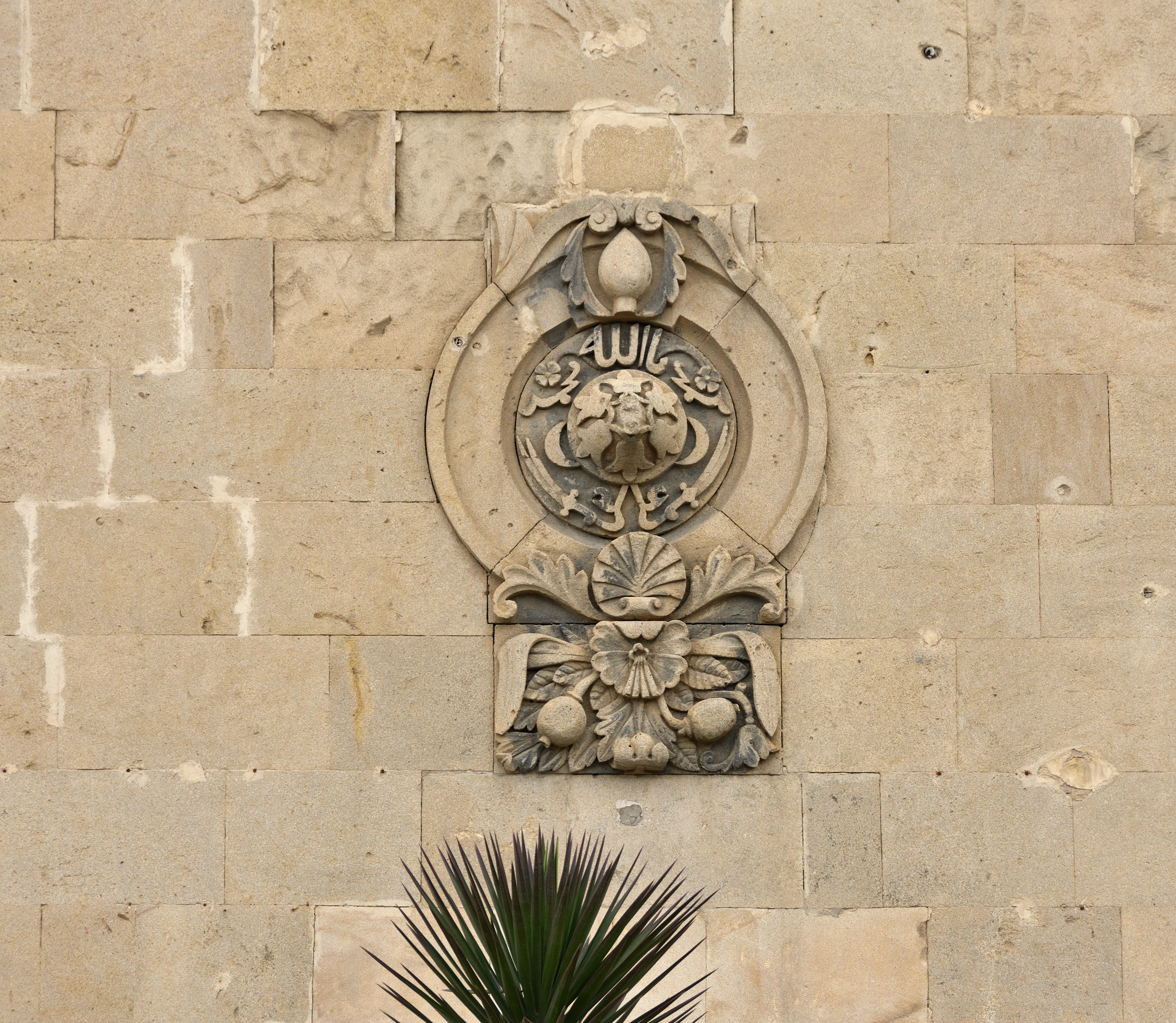
