= Zeynal Zeynalov =

Zeynal Zeynalov may refer to:

- Zeynal Zeynalov (footballer)
- Zeynal Zeynalov (politician)
