= Sona Nuriyeva =

Soviet-Azerbaijani aviator and politician (1915-1986)

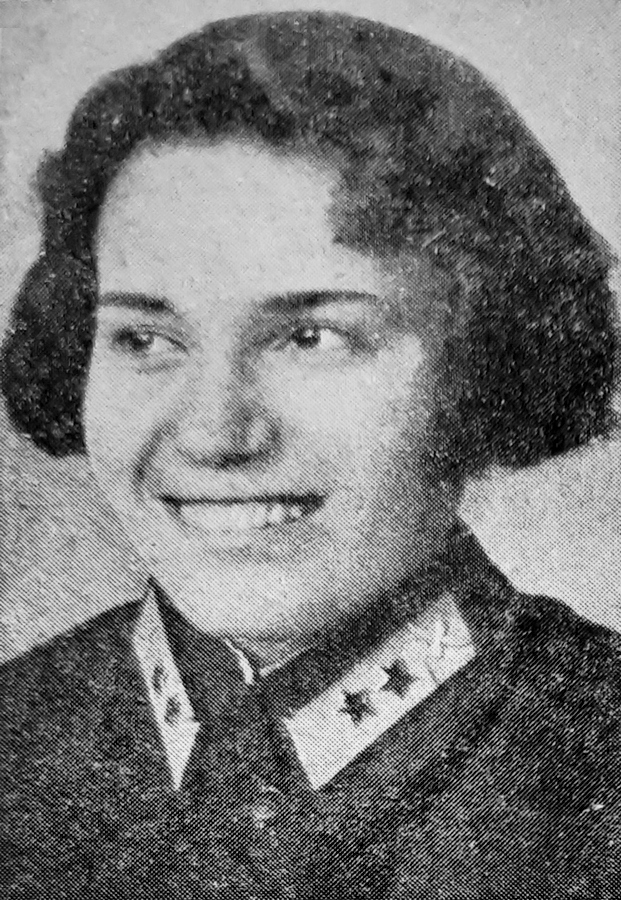

Member of the Supreme Soviet
- In office 1936–1946

Personal details
- Born: December 15, 1915 Əmircan, Baku, Russian Empire
- Died: 1986 Baku, Azerbaijan
- Occupation: Aviator, politician
- Awards: Order of Lenin, Order of the Badge of Honour

Sona Nuriyeva (Azerbaijani: Sona Nuriyeva; 15 December 1915 – 1986) was a Soviet aviator, deputy of the 1st convocation of the Supreme Soviet of the USSR, and one of the first Azerbaijani female aviators.

== Biography ==
Sona Nuriyeva was born on December 15, 1915, in the village of Amirjan in Baku city. In 1930, she graduated from high school and enrolled in the Baku Aero Club. Nuriyeva graduated from the Baku Pilots Club in 1932. From 1932 to 1934, she worked as an instructor at the Baku Aero Club.

In 1936, she graduated from the Bataysk Flying School, where she had enrolled in 1934. From 1945, Nuriyeva was a member of the CPSU as well as the Baku Pilots Club. Sona Nuriyeva was one of the first Azerbaijani female aviators and one of the first woman deputies from the Azerbaijan SSR. She worked as a pilot in the civil aviation administration of the Azerbaijan SSR.

From 1936 to 1937, she was a pilot in the 222nd Aviation Squadron of the Transcaucasian Civil Air Fleet Directorate of the USSR. From 1937 to 1943, Nuriyeva served as a pilot in the 19th Aviation Squadron of the Azerbaijani Aviation Group, and from 1943 to 1945, she was a pilot in the 9th Transport Aviation Squadron of the Azerbaijani Civil Air Fleet Directorate of the USSR. She participated in the "Great Patriotic War", carrying out special missions with flights to Tehran.

From 1945, she switched to flights on international routes (Germany, Bulgaria, Yugoslavia, Poland, etc.). From 1949 to 1968, she worked at the Zabrat Airport.

From 1968, she was a personal pensioner of republican significance, and from 1978, she was a personal pensioner of union significance.

She was elected as a deputy of the 1st convocation of the Supreme Soviet of the USSR.

She was awarded the Order of Lenin (January 27, 1936) and the Order of the Badge of Honour as well as various medals. Several essays and poems are dedicated to Nuriyeva. Additionally, Sona Nuriyeva was awarded the Honorary Diploma of the Azerbaijani SSR.

== Literature ==
- Нуриева С. Речь на приеме делегации Советского Азербайджана руководителями партии и правительства в Кремле //Бакинский рабочий. — 1936. — 24 января.- С.2. (in Russian)
- Сона Пири кызы Нуриева, летчица гражданского воздушного флота, орденоносец: [Трудящимися Закатальского избирательного округа выдвинута кандидатура Соны Нуриевой в депутаты Совета Национальностей Верховного Совета СССР] //Бакинский рабочий. — 1937. — 24 ноября. — С.3. (in Russian)
- Кагальницкий Г. Сона Нуриева: Кандидат в Депутаты Верховного Совета СССР //Авиационная газета. — 1937. — 5 декабря. (in Russian)
- Алиев Ф. Первые лётчицы Азербайджана: [Лейла Мамедбекова, Сона Нуриева, Зулейха Сеидмамедова] //Вышка. — 1996. — 8 марта. — С.5. (in Russian)
