= Haji Sultanali Mosque =

Mosque in Baku, Azerbaijan

- Azerbaijani: Hacı Sultanəli Məscidi; Arabic: مسجد الحاج سلطان علي
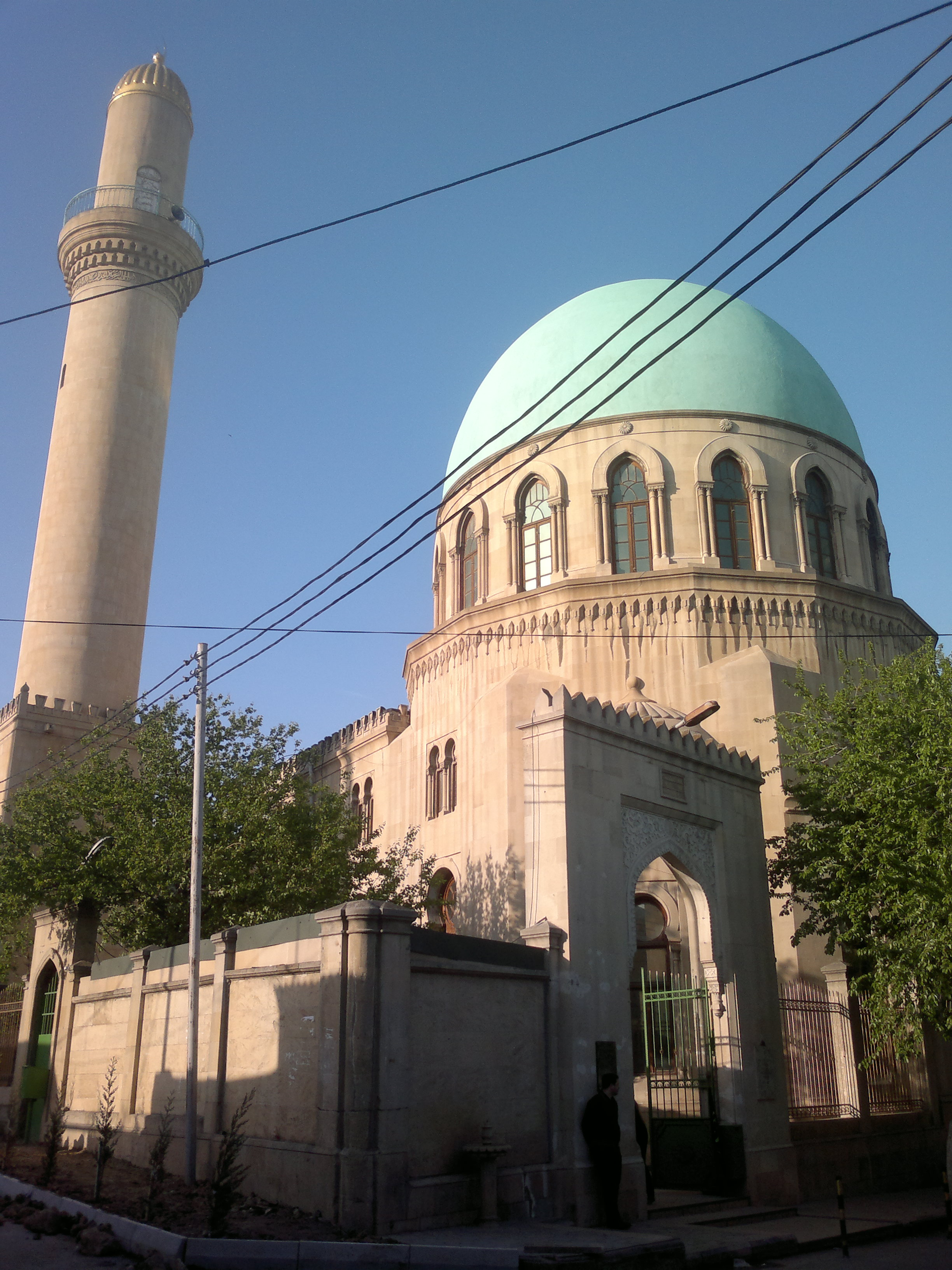
- The mosque in 2014

- Location of the mosque in Baku

Religion
- Affiliation: Islam
- Ecclesiastical or organizational status: Mosque (1910–1928); Profane use (1928–1991); Mosque (since 2001)
- Status: Active

Location
- Location: Baku, Asheron
- Country: Azerbaijan
- Interactive map of Haji Sultanali Mosque
- Coordinates: 40°22′44″N 49°49′47″E

Architecture
- Architect: Zivar bay Ahmadbayov
- Type: Mosque architecture
- Style: Shirvan-Absheron
- Groundbreaking: 1904
- Completed: 1910

Specifications
- Dome: One
- Dome height (outer): 23 m (75 ft)
- Minaret: One
- Minaret height: 35 m (115 ft)

The Haji Sultanali Mosque (Azerbaijani: Hacı Sultanəli Məscidi; Arabic: مسجد الحاج سلطان علي) is a mosque and historical architectural monument, located in Baku, Azerbaijan.

Completed in 1910, the mosque was included in the list of immovable historical and cultural monuments of national importance by the decision No. 132 of the Cabinet of Ministers of the Republic of Azerbaijan on August 2, 2001.

== History ==
Designed by Zivar bay Ahmadbayov, the Haji Sultanali Mosque was the concept of the millionaire Haji Sultanali, and was built between 1904 and 1910. The mosque is not far from the Nizami metro station.

=== Grave of Turkish soldier ===
During excavation work carried out during the construction of the minaret, the grave of a soldier named Ahmad, from the Islamic Army of the Caucasus, was discovered beneath its foundation. It is believed that the soldier died in 1918 during a battle with Armenian Dashnaks in an area then known as "Karamelni." During the construction process, the remains of the deceased were collected and reburied at the base of the minaret, and a memorial plaque was placed to honor him.

=== Soviet occupation ===
After the Soviet occupation, an official campaign against religion began in 1928. In December of that year, the Central Committee of the Communist Party of Azerbaijan handed over many mosques, churches, and synagogues to clubs for educational purposes. While there were 3,000 mosques in Azerbaijan in 1917, this number dropped to 1,700 in 1927 and to just 17 by 1933. The Haji Sultanali Mosque was closed for worship during this period. For a time, the building was used by the Special Scientific Production Workshop. The first floor housed a production workshop, and the second floor was occupied by the Scientific Design Bureau. During the Soviet era, the mosque was also used by "Azkonsert." However, despite its use, the mosque's appearance and interior were not damaged.

=== After independence ===
After Azerbaijan regained its independence, the mosque was returned to the faithful for religious use. In April 2000, reconstruction and restoration work began on the mosque. The restoration was completed in October 2001, and the mosque was reopened. During the restoration, partitions of rooms that had been added later on the first floor were removed, and the surfaces of pilasters, cornices, the mihrab, and other elements were cleaned. The mezzanine floor that had been installed later was also dismantled. The brick floor, doors, and windows were cleaned of filling and paint, and restored. The staircase leading to the second floor was rebuilt to fit the interior, wooden additions were removed, and the floor was covered with limestone. Later-added walls on the second floor were demolished and replaced with partitions made of gypsum or gypsum concrete. The north facade of the building was clad in limestone over a metal mesh frame.

The mosque was included in the list of immovable historical and cultural monuments of local significance by the decision No. 132 of the Cabinet of Ministers of the Republic of Azerbaijan on August 2, 2001.

== Architecture ==
The mosque is two stories tall. The upper floor is designated for women, while the lower floor is for men. The mosque’s layout is square-shaped. The height of the mosque is 23 m (75 ft), and its minaret stands at 35 m (115 ft). Initially, the mosque did not have a minaret, but the current minaret was built between 1995 and 1996. The dome is sky-colored and features 12 windows. The interior of the mosque is composed of 12 columns and arches.

== Gallery ==
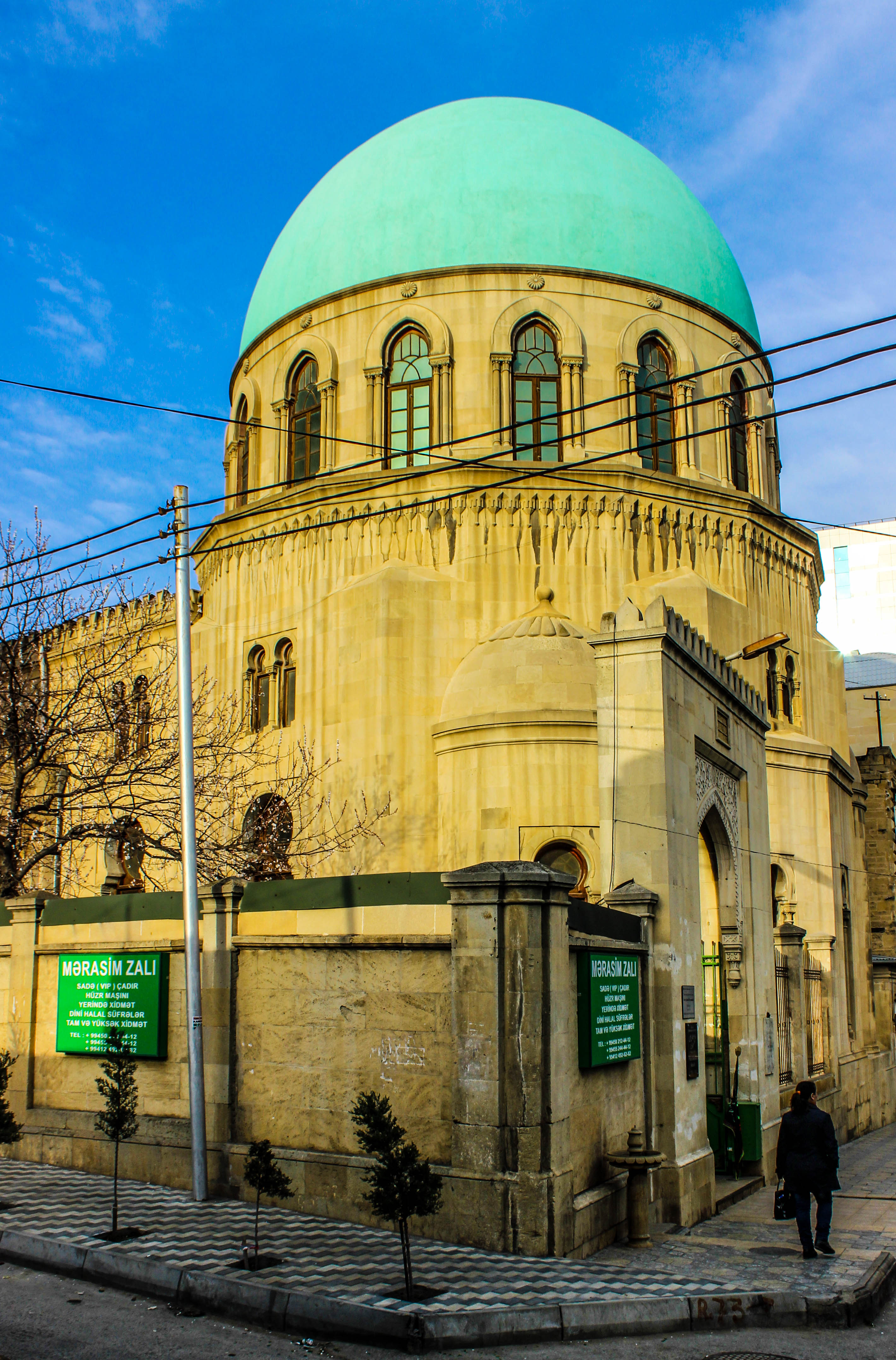

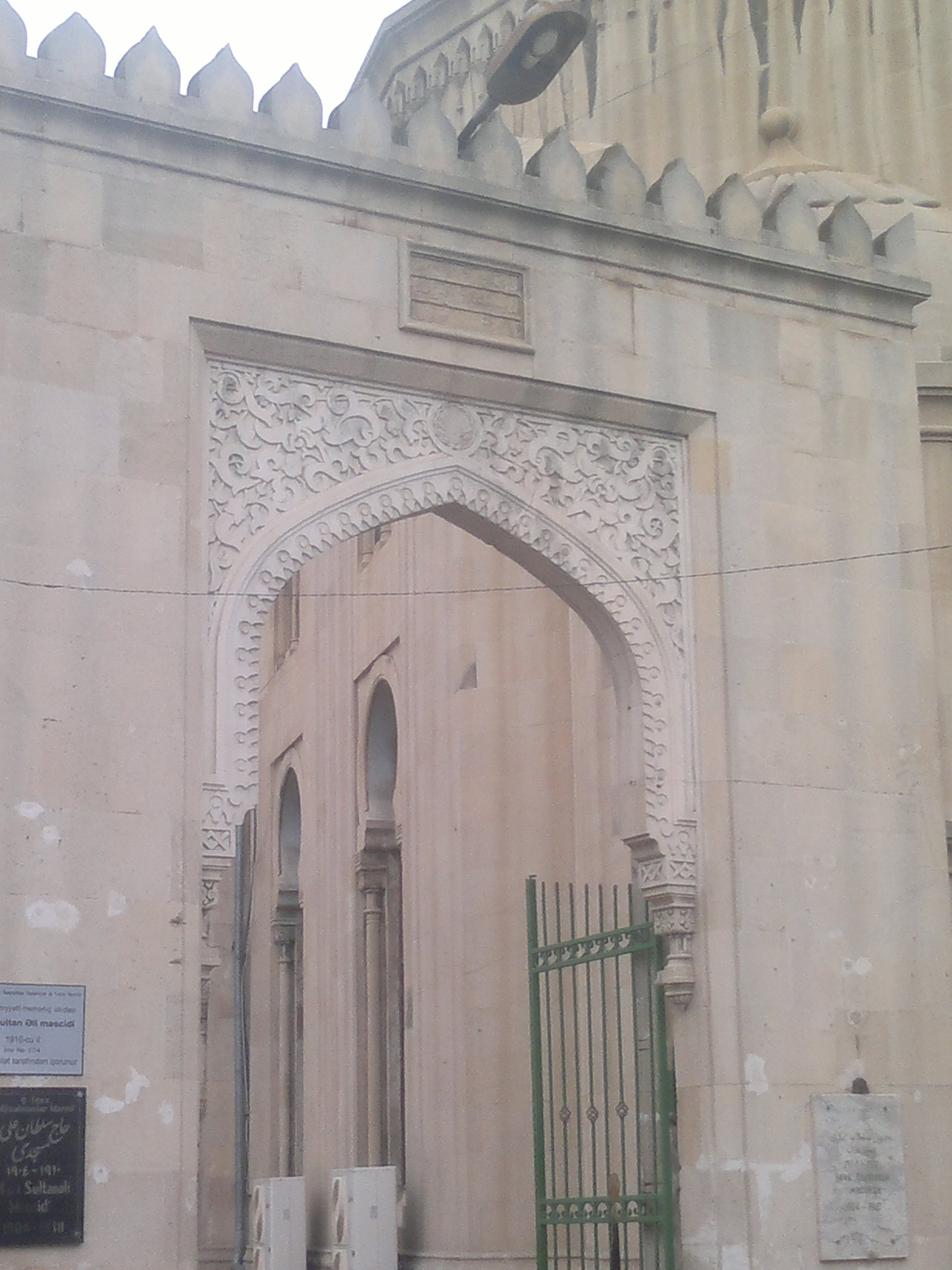

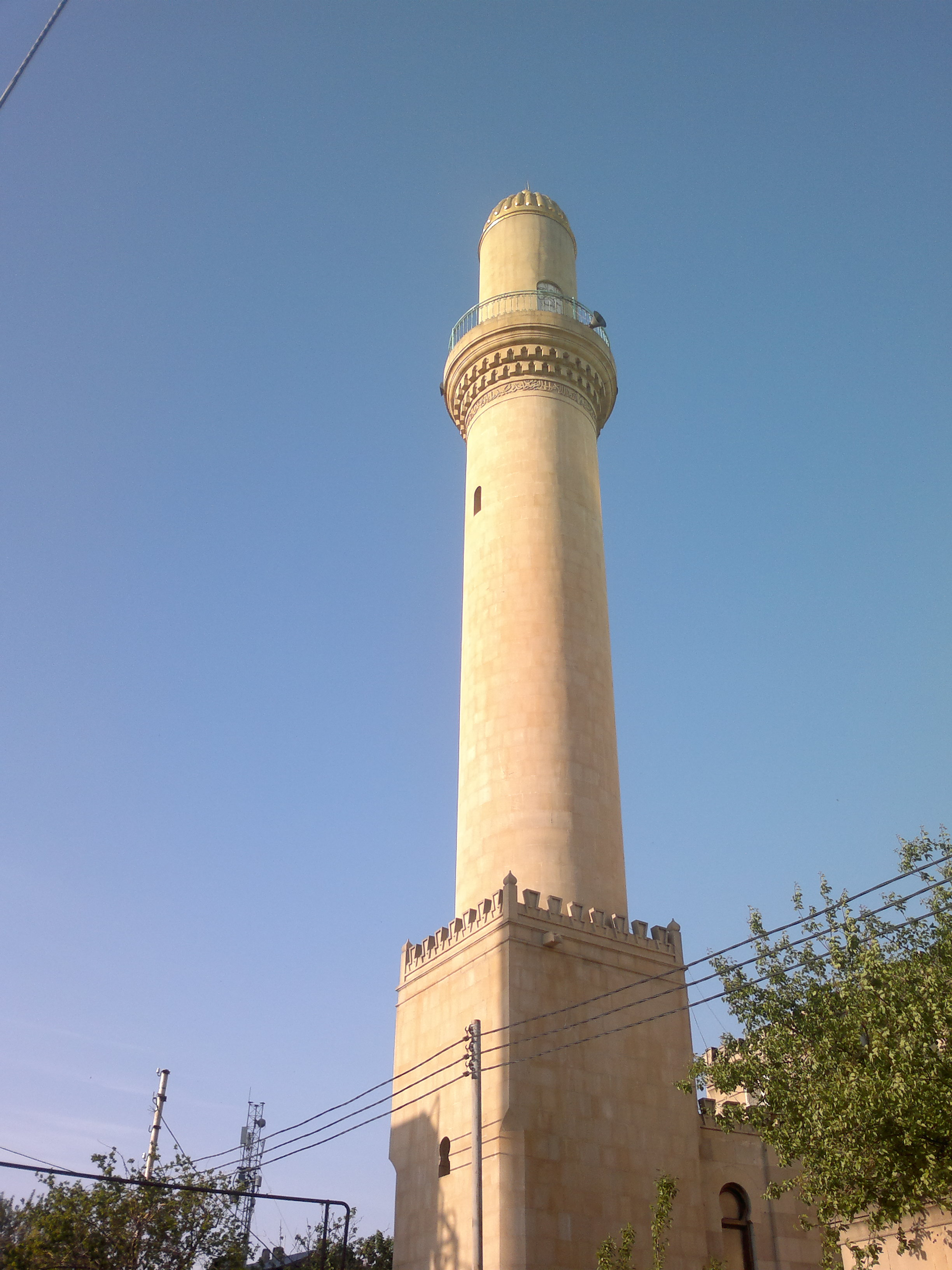

== See also ==
- Islam in Azerbaijan
- List of mosques in Azerbaijan
- List of mosques in Baku
