= Mirza Abu Turab Akhundzade =

Azerbaijani author (1817–1910)

Akhund Mirza Abu Turab Akhundzade
- Mirzə Əbu Turab Axundzadə
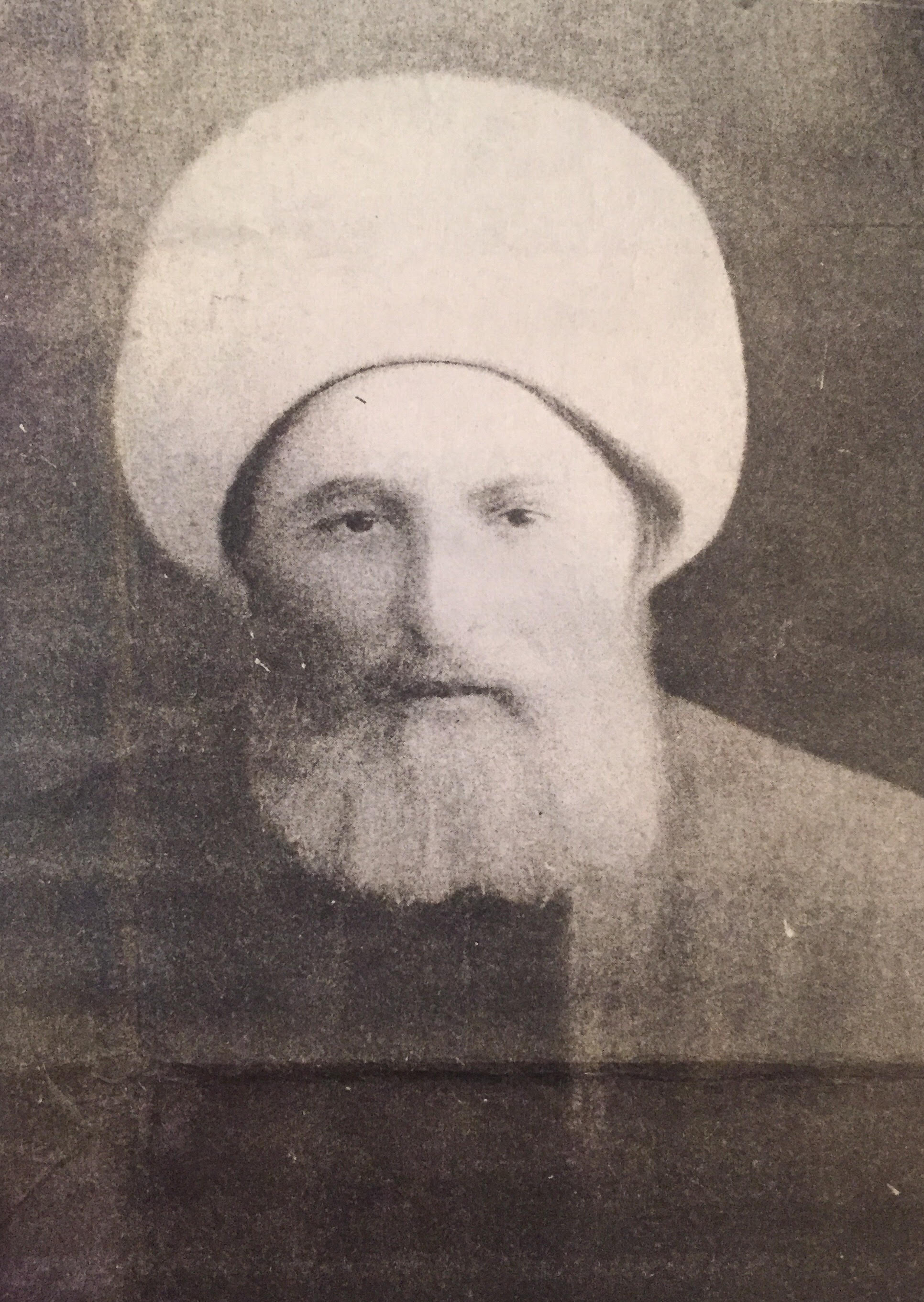

Personal life
- Born: 24 April 1817 Emircan, Baku, Russian Empire
- Died: 20 February 1910 (aged 92) Emircan, Baku, Russian Empire
- Resting place: Akhund Abuturab Mausoleum
- Occupation: clergyman, publicist, enlightener

Religious life
- Religion: Islam
- Denomination: Shia
- School: Usuli
- Sect: Twelver Shi'ism
- Jurisprudence: Ja'fari

Mirza Abu Turab Akhundzade (Azerbaijani: میرزا ابو تراب آخوندزاده, Mirzə Əbu Turab Axundzadə, 1817, Baku, Russian Empire - 1910, Baku, Russian Empire) was an Azerbaijani theologian, publicist, educator, enlightener.

== Life ==
He was born in 1817 in Əmircan, Baku. He received his primary education in the madrasa of Mirza Hasib Qudsi, and his higher religious education in the city of Medina.

He published numerous articles on the pages of Azerbaijani newspapers and magazines, and was the author of books on the history and philosophy of religion. He was a supporter of progressive initiatives in the field of education and was closely acquainted with Haji Zeynalabdin Tagiyev. Furthermore, he gave his daughter to the Baku Muslim Women's School, which caused the anger and discontent of the believers. He died in 1910 and was buried in Mardakan, at the Pir Hasan Mausoleum. Zeynalabdin Tagiyev was buried nearby and, according to legend, he bequeathed to bury himself at the feet of Abuturab.

== Religious views and education ==
Akhundzade was an Akhund and a writer on religious subjects. His book İslamın təfriqəsi səbəbləri (The Causes of Division in Islam), published in Baku in 1914, addressed divisions within Islam.

In an essay published in Həyat in 1906, “Bizə hansı elmlər lazımdır?” (“What Sciences Do We Need?”), Akhundzade argued that knowledge of the natural sciences alone did not make a person morally complete and emphasized the importance of religious learning. In an accompanying editorial, the newspaper's editor, Ali bey Huseynzade, said the essay was only partly in accord with Həyat's position and discussed its argument about religious and rational sciences.

== Relations with the Russian authorities ==
In 1845–1846, Akhundzade was invited to Tiflis and offered the position of qadi of Baku province by the Caucasus viceroy and Muhammadali Huseynzade, the Sheikh-ul-Islam of Transcaucasia. He declined the offer.

== Works ==
- Reasons for the division of Islam
