= Mukhtarov Mosque =

One of the mosques in the city of Vladi Kafkaz

Coordinates: 43°1′33″N 44°40′33″E

Mukhtarov Mosque Мухтаров мечеть
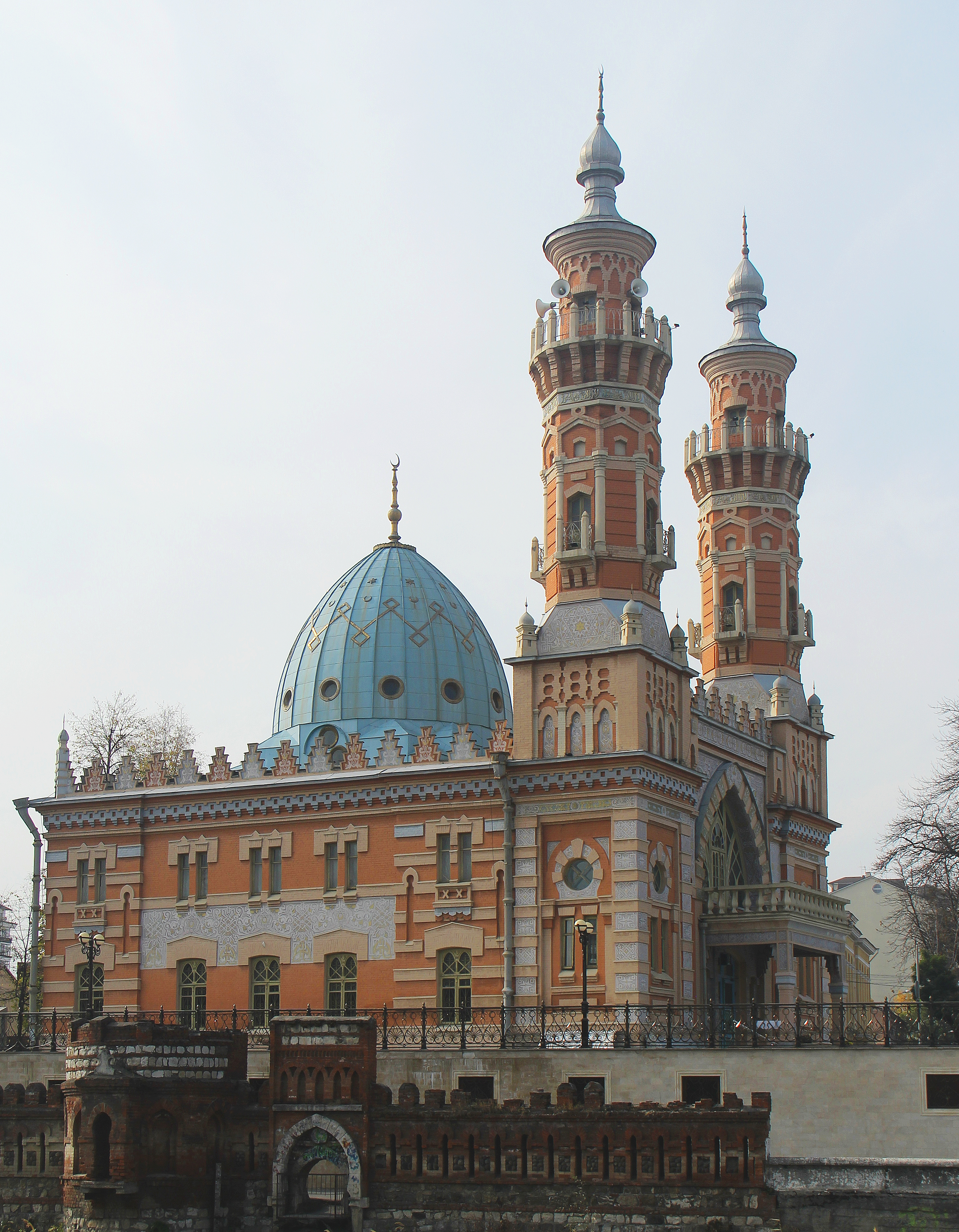

Religion
- Affiliation: Islam

Location
- Location: Vladikavkaz, Russia
- Interactive map of Mukhtarov Mosque; Мухтаров мечеть

Architecture
- Architect: Józef Plośko
- Type: Mosque
- Style: Mamluk
- Established: 1908

Specifications
- Dome: 1
- Minaret: 2

The Sunni Mosque or the Mukhtarov Mosque is a historic mosque on the left bank of the Terek River in Vladikavkaz, Russia. The mosque owes its name to the Azerbaijani millionaire Murtuza Mukhtarov who financed its construction in 1900–1908. The architect Józef Plośko was inspired by Al-Azhar and other mosques of Cairo. Plośko was also the architect of Mukhtarov Palace in Baku. The mosque serves the Ossetian Muslim minority.

The Sunni Mosque is known for its picturesque setting against the dramatic backdrop of the Caucasus Mountains. It also used to serve the Ingush residents of Vladikavkaz before they were expelled from North Ossetia in the 1990s. The mosque has been protected as a historic landmark since 1934. In 1996, it was badly damaged by an explosion and later restored.

== History ==
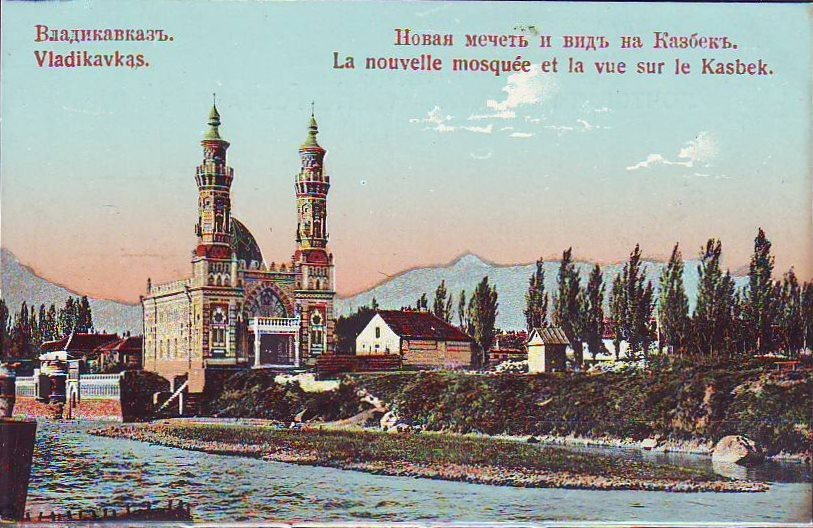

The permission to build the mosque was issued in 1900. The city government allocated a plot of land on the left bank of the Terek river for this construction. The Priazovsky Krai newspaper reported that the construction of the mosque cost 80,000 rubles, of which more than 50,000 were contributed by the Azerbaijani millionaire and a prominent philanthropist in the Caucasus Murtuza Mukhtarov, from which the mosque gets its name. The project was commissioned from his favorite architect Józef Plośko. The opening of the mosque took place on October 14, 1908.

On January 24, 1914, a letter of gratitude to M. Mukhtarov from Ingush representatives was published in the Muslim Newspaper:

On Friday, January 10, 1914, agronomist M. Dzhabagiev, in the Sunni Mosque, read a letter received in the name of the Society for Education of the Ingush people from Mr. M. Mukhtarov, the letter states that Mr. Mukhtarov donated 5,000 rubles to the Society for the construction of a school. On this occasion, on January 12, a general meeting of members of the Society for Education of the Ingush people was held and it was discussed to send to Mr. Mukhtarov, a word of gratitude and award him the title of honorary member of the society, by the chairman of the society K. Kozlov, fellow chairman G. Malsagov, members of S. Bazorkin and the mullah of the Vladikavkaz mosque T. Giriev.

— Chada Dobriev (Vladikavkaz, January 14, 1914)

== See also ==
- Baku Mosque
- Islam in North Ossetia–Alania
- Islam in Russia
- List of mosques in Russia
- List of mosques in Europe
