= Nizamaddin Mosque =

Former mosque in Baku, Azerbaijan

- Azerbaijani: Nizaməddin Məscidi
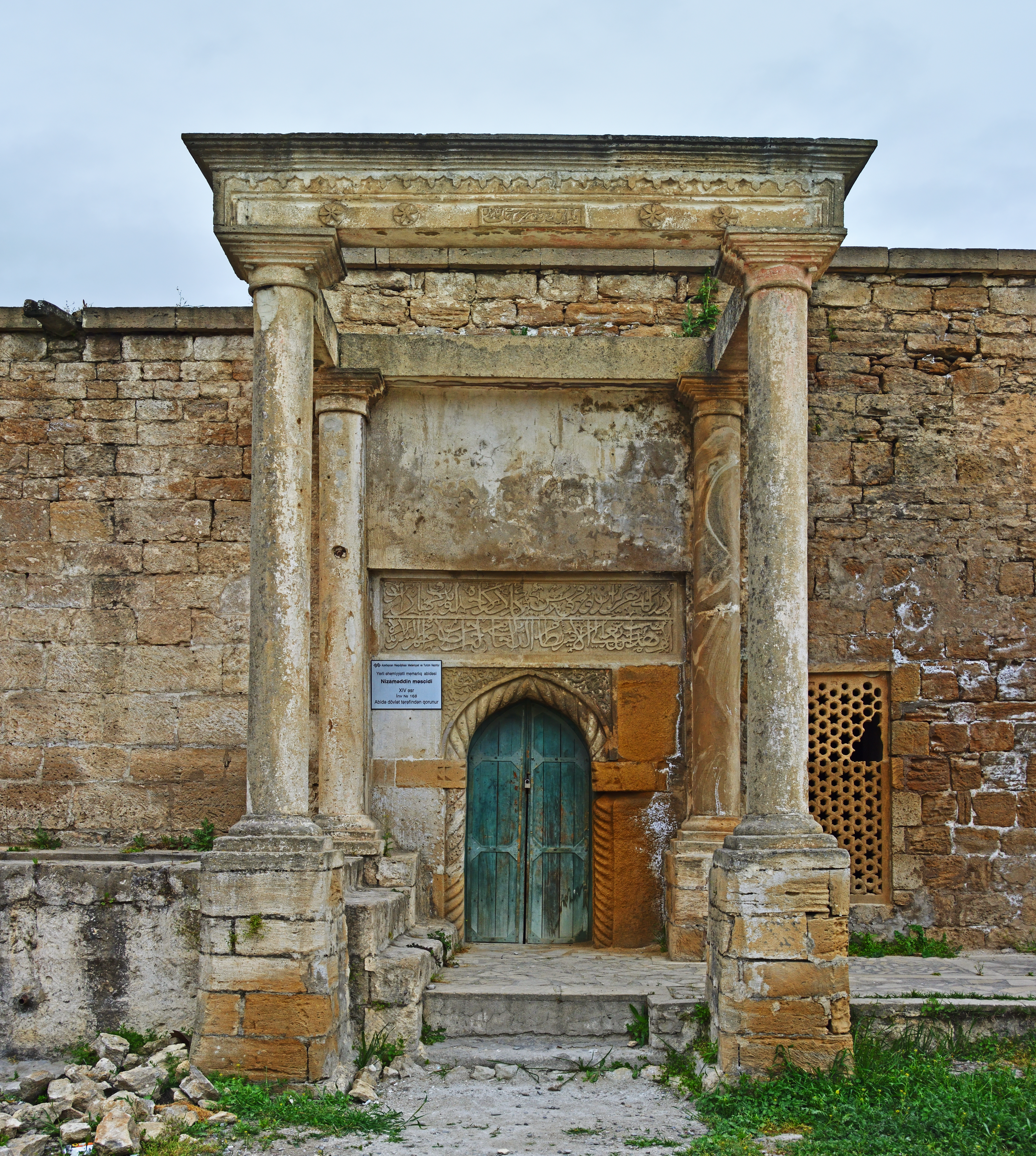
- The former mosque in 2019

- Location of the former mosque in Azerbaijan

Religion
- Affiliation: Islam (former)
- Ecclesiastical or organizational status: Mosque (1330–1928)
- Status: Closed (as a mosque); Preserved (as a historic site)

Location
- Location: Amirjan, Baku
- Country: Azerbaijan
- Interactive map of Nizamaddin Mosque
- Coordinates: 40°25′12″N 49°59′12″E

Architecture
- Type: Mosque architecture
- Style: Islamic; Shirvan-Absheron
- Founder: Amir Nizamaddin Kesrani
- Completed: 730 AH (1329/1330 CE)

Specifications
- Dome: One
- Dome height (inner): 7.5 m (25 ft)
- Dome dia. (inner): 6 m (20 ft)
- Inscriptions: Four (maybe more)

The Nizamaddin Mosque (Azerbaijani: Nizaməddin Məscidi) is a former mosque and cultural historical and architectural monument of the 14th century, located in the Amirjan settlement of Baku, the capital city of Azerbaijan.

Completed in c. 1330, the former mosque was included in the list of the country's significant immovable historical and cultural monuments by the decision numbered 132 of the Cabinet of Ministers of the Republic of Azerbaijan on August 2, 2001

== History ==
The Nizamaddin Mosque was constructed in 730 AH (1329/1330 CE) during the rule of the Shirvanshahs in Amirjan. The mosque was built by Amir Nizamaddin Kesrani.

The mosque is adorned with carved and white-colored cut stones. Among the four entrance gates, three have stone inscriptions. The inner area of the prayer hall measures 24 m × 6 m (79 ft × 20 ft), with a height of 5 m (16 ft). The mihrab (prayer niche) of the mosque is 2 m (6 ft 7 in) tall and has the Arabic word "Allah" inscribed in several places. The walls of the mosque are 1 m (3 ft 3 in) thick, and the height from the floor to the dome's apex is 7.5 m (25 ft). The dome's diameter is 6 m (20 ft). The mosque does not have a minaret, and the dome's height from the façade is 1.5 m (4 ft 11 in).

A verse in Persian is written above the door of the central part of the mosque, translated into English, reads:

The world is nothing but fun, luxury, glory and suffering

The second line written in Arabic, translated into English, reads:

This construction of the house of Allah was ordered by the esteemed Amir Nizamaddin Amirhac, son of Fakhraddin. Hijri year 730 (1329–1330 CE).

In 1384–1385, the Nizamaddin Mosque was renovated by Sharafeddin, and a new portal was constructed in its southern courtyard. A stone inscription was placed above the gate. The inscription, in Arabic, inscribed in two lines, reads in English:

The construction of this building was ordered by Sharafeddin, son of Sheikh Mahmud, son of Nasreddin Gutlugshah. 786 AH (1384/1385 CE).

In 1830–1831, significant and substantial restoration works were carried out at the mosque, including the construction of a new room beside its northern wall. Above the door in the northern side of the west facade of the mosque, two horizontal rectangular inscriptions were placed. The upper inscription in Nastaliq script indicates that the mosque was renovated by the master Suleyman. It appears from historical facts that with each renovation, new additions were made to the architectural elements of the mosque, and the names of those responsible for these additions were reflected in the new inscriptions. One such addition dates back to 1876 when the mosque was renovated and expanded by Fatma Khanim. The inscription, translated into English, states:

Truly, this mosque was built by Haji Rasul's daughter, Fatma Khanim. The inscription was written by Muhammad Naghi. 1293 AH (1876/1877 CE).

In the early 20th century, the mosque needed renovation, and during the construction, a gateway was arranged in the center of the western eyvan (a vaulted hall), in front of the gate built by Nizamaddin, consisting of four stone columns. Above this gate, a one-line inscription in Arabic alphabet, translated into English, reads:

This portal was built by Rizvan, son of Haji Khalif.

The mosque was constructed on a rock surface, beneath which there is a cellar. It is believed that this cellar might have served as a refuge during wars and raids until the early 19th century. Later, this cellar served as a crypt. During research, coffins and human skeletons were found here. After 1920, the crypt was closed off, and burials were prohibited there.

=== Soviet occupation ===
Soviet occupation initiated an official anti-religious campaign from 1928 onwards. In December of that year, the Azerbaijan Communist Party Central Committee transferred many mosques, churches, and synagogues to the balance sheets of educational clubs for secular use. If in 1917 there were around 3,000 mosques in Azerbaijan, by 1927, this number had decreased to 1,700, and by 1933, it was reduced to 17.

Following the occupation, mosques were closed down.

=== After independence ===
After the restoration of Azerbaijan's independence, the mosque was included in the list of significant immovable historical and cultural monuments of the country by decision number 132 of the Cabinet of Ministers of the Republic of Azerbaijan on August 2, 2001.

In 2020, during the restoration works carried out in the Amirjan settlement, Nizamaddin Mosque underwent restoration as well.

== See also ==
- Islam in Azerbaijan
- List of mosques in Azerbaijan
- List of mosques in Baku
