= Pir Hasan Mausoleum =

Historic site in Mardakan, Azerbaijan

Pir Hasan Mausoleum Pir Həsən türbəsi
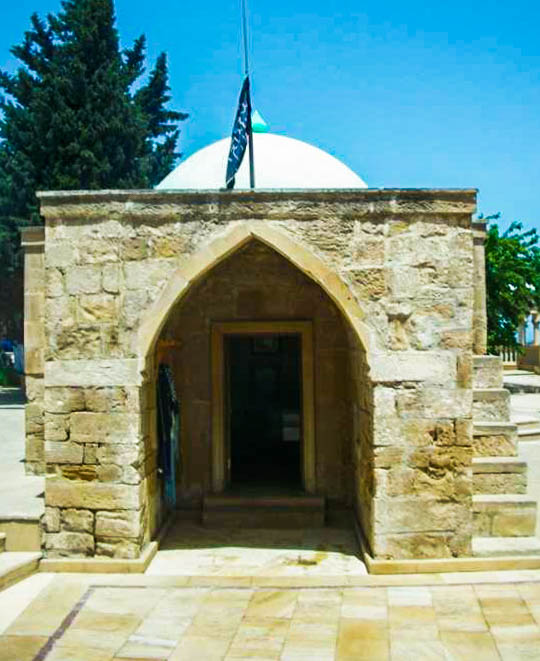

Religion
- Affiliation: Islam

Location
- Location: Mərdəkan
- Country: Azerbaijan
- Interactive map of Pir Hasan Mausoleum; Pir Həsən türbəsi

Architecture
- Established: XVII century

Pir Hasan Mausoleum (Azerbaijani: Pir Həsən türbəsi) is a historical and religious architectural monument of the 17th century located in Mardakan, Azerbaijan.

== History ==
An inscription with a stone frame is placed on the entrance door of the mausoleum. According to the inscription, the tomb was built in 1021 in the Hijri calendar (1612/1613 AD) during the reign of Shah Abbas I.

According to “kitaba” carved above the entrance, the tomb was raised in 1021 by the lunar calendar, which corresponds to 1612-1613 according to Gregorian calendar. In another “kitaba”, carved to the left side of the entrance, it is indicated that the tomb was built by the master named Nadir Ali.

Near the tomb of Pir-Hasan, there is another small mausoleum where is believed to be buried Khadija, the daughter of the seventh Shiite imam Musa al-Kazim. She fled with her sisters to Caucasus after her brother Ali al-Rida was killed in Mashhad. Both buildings today represent a single architectural complex.

The theologian Mirza Abuturab Akhundzade is buried on the territory adjacent to the tomb. In 1924, at the foot of the theologian's grave, according to his will, the millionaire and philanthropist Zeynalabdin Tagiyev was buried, and in 1990 a monument was raised on the grave of the latter. Tagiyev's daughter Sarah and her first husband, lawyer Zeynal Selimkhanov, who died during the Stalinist repressions, are also buried here.

== Architecture ==
The main construction of the sanctuary has the shape of a square building. The vestibule, 2.2 meters long, protrudes forward and is covered by an ogive vault. Inside the tomb, the dome rests on sails, into which the paired ledges pass, being located in all the inner four corners. The tomb's lining is made of hewn stone both inside and outside.

In 2007, the sanctuary was overhauled with the support of Heydar Aliyev Foundation. The architectural complex was replenished with a small mosque.

== Literature ==
- Саламзаде, А. В. (1964). Архитектура Азербайджана XVI-XIX вв. Баку: Издательство Академии наук Азербайджанской ССР.

== Sources ==
- "Pir Həsən ziyarətgahı". No. 16. Mədəniyyət qəzeti. 27 January 2010.
- "Pir Həsən ziyarətgahı". Azərbaycan Respublikası Mədəniyyət Nazirliyi. 25 December 2008.
