= Baku Mosque =

Mosque in Astrakhan, Russia

- Russian: Мечеть «Бакы» Azerbaijani: Bakı məscidi
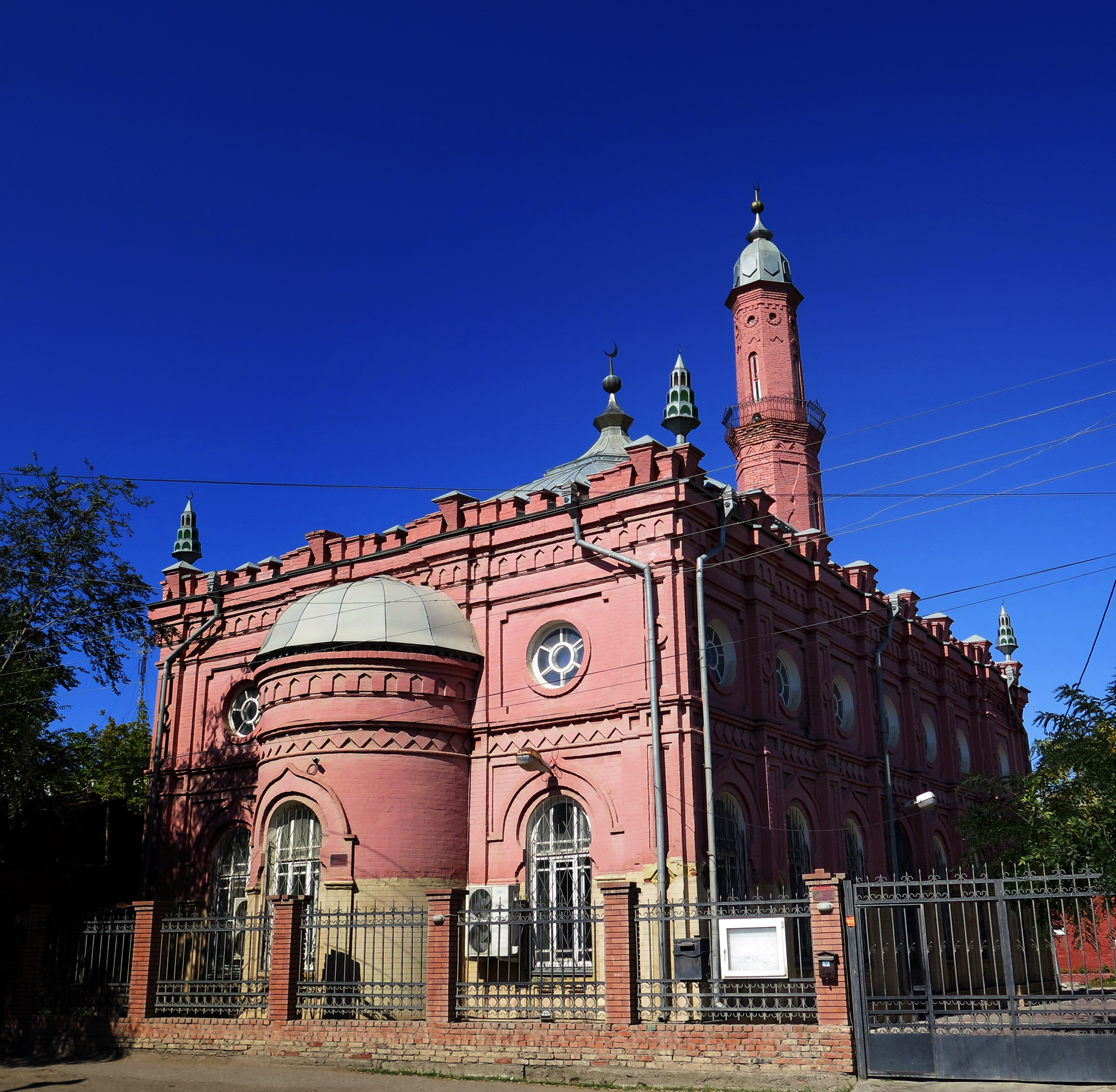

- Location within Russia

Religion
- Affiliation: Shia (Twelver)

Location
- Location: Astrakhan
- Country: Russia
- Coordinates: 46°20′30″N 48°02′36″E

Architecture
- Style: Islamic architecture
- Completed: 1907-1909
- Materials: brick

Baku Mosque or Kriushi Mosque is a mosque built in 1907–1909 in Astrakhan. During the Soviet rule, the minaret of the mosque was destroyed, and in different years its building was used as a storehouse and cultural center. In 2002, with the efforts of the Azerbaijani diaspora in Astrakhan, the mosque was restored and presented to the Azerbaijani community and named Baku Mosque. The mosque is located on Bakinskaya Street in Astrakhan.

== About ==
According to historical data, in 1903, 238 people from Astrakhan gathered and decided to build a mosque on the place of the prayer house, which had been operating since 1897 and was located in the territory of the local resident Nijemetdinov, in the Kriushi region. In 1907, the Astrakhan governorate allowed the construction of a stone mosque on the 2nd Bakaldinskiy street on the land bequeathed by Nijemetdinov. The mullah of the mosque was also appointed in May. Construction started in June 1907 and ended in 1909. The school operated male and female schools. In 1938, during the Soviet rule, the mosque was closed and the building was used as a storehouse. In 1940, the minaret of the mosque was destroyed. In 1950, they planned to use the building as a gymnasium. Therefore, the second floor inside the building was demolished. A fire in the building in 1987 damaged its floor and interior.

In 2002, the mosque was renovated with the efforts of the Azerbaijani community of Astrakhan province. After the renovation, the mosque was named "Baku" and was presented to the Azerbaijani community. In addition to Azerbaijanis, other Muslims also pray in the mosque.

== See also ==
- Mukhtarov Mosque
