= Zivar bay Ahmadbayov =

Azerbaijani architect

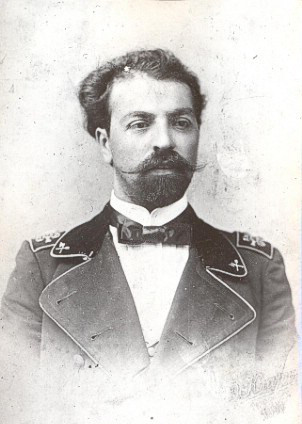
- Born: 1873; Shamakhy, Azerbaijan
- Died: 1925 (aged 51–52); Baku, Azerbaijan
- Education: Saint-Petersburg State University of Architecture and Civil Engineering
- Scientific career
- Fields: Architecture
- Workplaces: Baku Governorate

Zivar bay Garay bay oglu Ahmadbayov (Azerbaijani: Zivər bəy Əhmədbəyov; 1873 in Shamakhy – 1925 in Baku) was the first Azerbaijani architect with higher education.

== Biography ==
In 1902, Zivar bay Ahmadbayov graduated from Saint-Petersburg State University of Architecture and Civil Engineering. From this year to 1917, Ahmadbayov worked as an architect in Baku Governorate, then in Baku City Council. After the establishment of the Azerbaijan Democratic Republic, Ahmadbayov became the chief architect of Baku and held this post until 1922. Two of the largest mosques in Baku, the Baku-Blue Mosque and Taza Pir Mosque were constructed according to the projects of Ahmadbayov. Murtuza Mukhtarov Mosque, which was constructed according to Ahmadbayov's project in the municipality of Amirjan in Baku, was added to the list of historical monuments of UNESCO. Besides that, Ahmadbayov is the architect of a lot of houses in Vladikavkaz and the building of the Ophthalmology Institute in Baku.

== Memory ==
One of the streets of Baku is named after Zivar bay Ahmadbayov.

On May 26, 2011, the opening ceremony of Zivar bay Ahmadbayov’s monument, situated in a park named after him, near Nizami Ganjavi metro station was held in Baku.

== See also ==
- List of Zivar bey Ahmadbeyov buildings and structures
