= Palace of Happiness =

Historic building in Baku, Azerbaijan

Coordinates: 40°22′08″N 49°49′54″E

- Azerbaijani: Səadət Sarayı; Polish: Pałac Szczęścia
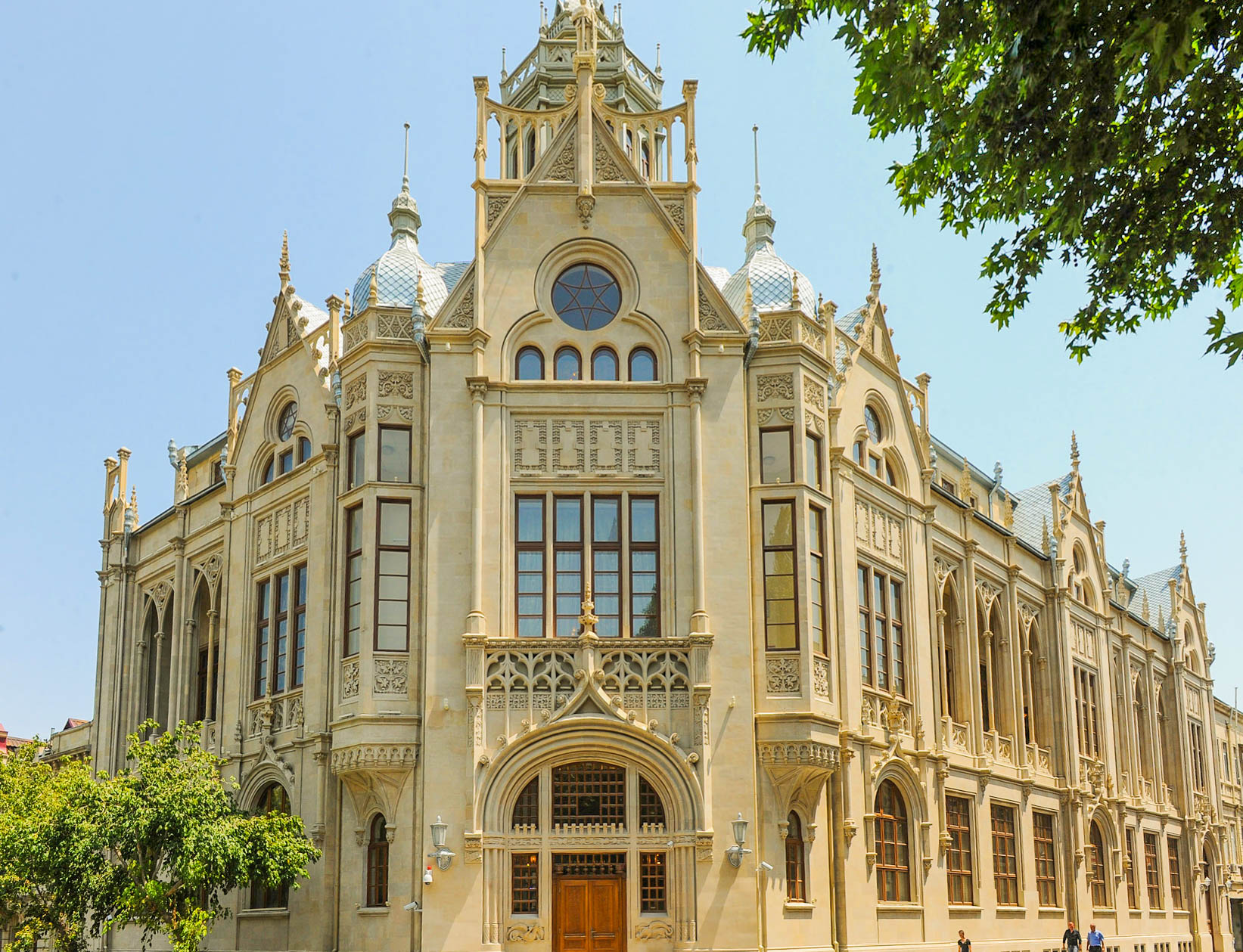
- Main façade overlooking Istiglaliyyat Street
- Interactive map of the Palace of Happiness area
- Former names: Mukhtarov Palace
- Alternative names: Palace of Marriage Registrations

General information
- Architectural style: Gothic
- Location: Baku, Sabail Raion, Istiglaliyyat St. 4, Azerbaijan
- Construction started: 1911
- Completed: 1912
- Owner: Mayoralty of Baku

Technical details
- Floor count: 5

Design and construction
- Architect: Józef Płoszko

The Palace of Happiness (Azerbaijani: Səadət Sarayı, Polish: Pałac Szczęścia), currently also called Palace of Marriage Registrations and previously called Mukhtarov Palace, is a historic building in the center of Baku, Azerbaijan, built in Neo-Gothic style in the early 20th century by Polish architect Józef Płoszko.

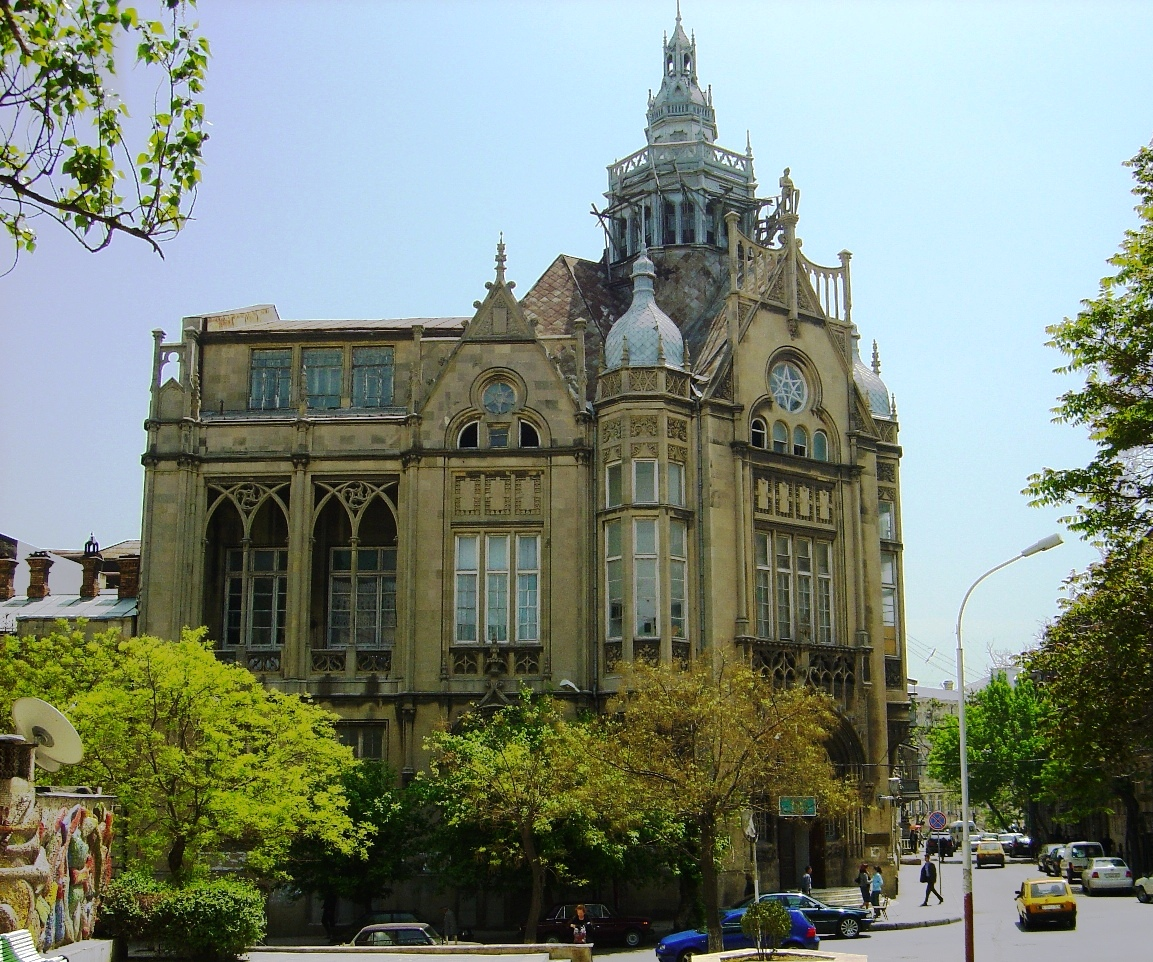

== History ==
The building was built by an Azerbaijani Oil Baron Murtuza Mukhtarov for his wife Liza-Khanum Tuganova. The designer was the Polish architect Józef Płoszko who had also built several other historic buildings in Baku in the early 20th century.

Mukhtarov often took his wife Lisa Tuganova, who was of Ossetian origin and the daughter of the Russian General Tuganov, on expensive trips to Europe. During one of their trips to France, they came across a beautiful French Gothic building. Lisa, astonished by its architecture said: "How happy the tenants of this building must be." Mukhtarov did not reply but on his return to Baku, he ordered his people off to France to purchase blue prints of the building and bring them back to Baku. An exact copy of the building was raised in central Baku within nine months. On its completion in 1912, Mukhtarov surprised his wife by driving her there in a carriage and telling her that it was her new residence. An intriguing detail is the statue above the entrance of the famous Polish medieval knight Zawisza Czarny (Zawisza the Black).

The couple still lived in the palace until 28 April 1920, when the Bolsheviks occupied Azerbaijan. Upon entering the building, three Russian officers were shot by Mukhtarov himself, after which he committed suicide. In 1922, Soviet authorities allowed the building to be used by the newly founded women's organization, the Ali Bayramov Club, which offered a variety of vocational skills and training to women, in additional to cultural and leisure activities. Afterward, it functioned as Shirvanshahs Museum. During the existence of Azerbaijan SSR, the palace functioned as the Palace of Marriage Registrations. On 2 August 2001, by a resolution issued by the Cabinet of Ministers of Azerbaijan, the building was listed as real estate of historic and state importance and was to be protected as a monument of Azerbaijani culture. The street lying on the right side of the building carries the name of Murtuza Mukhtarov. On 5 July 2012 the building has been reopened after major overhaul and restoration.
