= Marif Zeynalov =

Scientist from Azerbaijan

- Born: January 10, 1934; Shusha, Shusha District, NKAO, Azerbaijan SSR, TSFSR, USSR
- Died: June 5, 2020 (aged 86); Baku, Azerbaijan
- Education: Azerbaijan State Oil Academy

Marif Seyid Babir ogly Zeynalov (Azerbaijani: Marif Zeynalov Seyid Bəbir oğlu, January 10, 1934 – June 5, 2020) was a Candidate of sciences of Geology-Mineralogy, Honored scientist.

== Early life ==
Marif Zeynalov was born in 1934 in Shusha. He studied at the school of Shusha city in 1940 and graduated that school with honors in 1950. In 1950, he entered the faculty of Geological-Exploration at the Industrial Institute of Azerbaijan, earning an engineer-geologist's diploma in 1955. He graduated postgraduate study in 1962 and defended the dissertation work in the content of the geological-structural features of polymetal deposits of Nakhichevan in 1963. He is the author of more than 50 scientific articles.

== Family ==
His wife Zeynalova Kamala worked as a legal advisor. He has two daughters, Samira Marif Zeynalova and Saida Marif Zeynalova. Samira was born in Baku on 15 December in 1963, she works as a teacher of informatics at a secondary school in Moscow, Russia. Saida was born in Baku on 8 September in 1968, she now works as the leading scientific researcher of the Department of “Landscape Science and Landscape Planning” at the Institute of Geography named after academician H.A.Aliyev of ANAS.

== Creativity ==
While he was a student in 1954, he was accepted as the laboratory assistant in the Institute of Geology-Geophysics of ANAS. He has been busy with the geological mapping of fold districts of Nakhchivan performed on the scale of 1:50 000 and 1:25000 from 1954 to 1957. The research works had been carried along the northern-western border of the Republic of Iran in the south of Lesser Caucasus. In addition to this, the works of adaptation of rocks spread in Nakhchivan with the rocks of bordered regions with Iran, Turkey and Armenia had been researched. He worked in the expedition of Narimanov District in 1958–1959. In those years, he had compiled the geological map of intrusive massive of Dalidagh of Kalbajar District specialized with 1:25 000 scale. He entered to postgraduate study of the Institute of Geology of ANAS in 1959 and he had been engaged in the investigation of ore deposits. He graduated the postgraduate study in 1962 and defended the dissertation work in the content of “The geological-structural features of polymetal deposits of Nakhchivan” in 1963. In 1963–1966, he worked as a scientific researcher in the laboratory of “Ore deposits” of the Institute of Geology and was engaged in the challenges of ore of the volcanogenic formations of Lesser Caucasus. He was appointed as a head geologist in the expedition of Nakhchivan Geological-Exploration of the Institute of Geology of ANAS in 1967. During these works, some new deposits were revealed. Among them, a large territory with bauxites in the Paleozoic sediments in the area of Sharur district, and the alunite deposits in Eocene volcanic rocks in Ordubad district was able to be indicated. In 1975–1977, he served as an expert of UN in the geological service of Iran. Several alunite deposits were revealed together with Iranian geologists during these years. He worked as a head geologist of complex Geological Expedition of the Institute of Geology of ANAS in 1977–1981 during which more than 60 scientific articles regarding ore deposits of the Republic of Azerbaijan were published. He is one of the co-authors of the metallogenic map of Azerbaijan on the scale of 1:500 000. He was appointed a chief of the geological expedition of Nakhchivan in 1981.

== Awards ==
- With the anniversary medal for dedicated work on the occasion of the 100th anniversary of the birth of V.I.Lenin (in 1970)
- In 1980, he was awarded with the chest medal named “Explorer of the Earth’s Interior”.
- In 1980, the Ministry of Geology of USSR awarded him with the honorary title as “Honorary Explorer of the Earth’s Surface”.

== Published scientific works ==
- Зейналов М.Б. и др. Сопоставление миоценовых отложений Нахичевани, Армении, Ирана и Турции. Изв. АН Азерб. ССР, сер. Геол.-геогр. Наук, No. 3, 1959.
- Зейналов М.Б. Bлияние пострудных подвижек на текстурно-структурные особенности руд Гюмушлугского месторождения. Изв. АН Азерб. ССР, сер. геол.-геогр. наук и нефти, No. 3, 1962.
- Зейналов М.Б. Геолого-структурные особенности полиметалических месторождений
- Нахичевани. Автороферат. Баку, 1963. Зейналов М.Б. и др. Золотоносность медно-молибденовой формации Мисхано-Зангезурской складчатой зоны. Геологический ежегодник Азерб.отдела ЦИНИГРИ. 1974.
- Зейналов М.Б. Фосфориты. Геология СССР, т.47, "Недра", М., 1976.
- Зейналов М.Б. и др. Медно-кобальт-никелевые сульфидные минералы Кетамского месторождения (Малый Кавказ). Болгарская Академия наук, София, 1977.
- Бабаев И.А., Зейналов М.Б. Сравнительная характеристика алунитовых месторождений Азербайджанской ССР и Ирана. Сб. "Вопросы минералогии и рудных месторождений Азербайджана". Баку, "Элм", 1991.
- Zeynalov M. B. About alunite deposits of Azerbaijan and Iran and technology of alunite are refining. Reports of Azerbaijan geologists at the symposium of Islamic Republic of Iran. Baku, 1994.
- Babayev J. A., Zeynalov M. B. Genetic types of alunite deposites of Azerbaijan and Iran. International Volcanological Congress, Ankara, 1994.
