= Zeynal Zeynalov (politician) =

Azerbaijani politician (1876–1935)

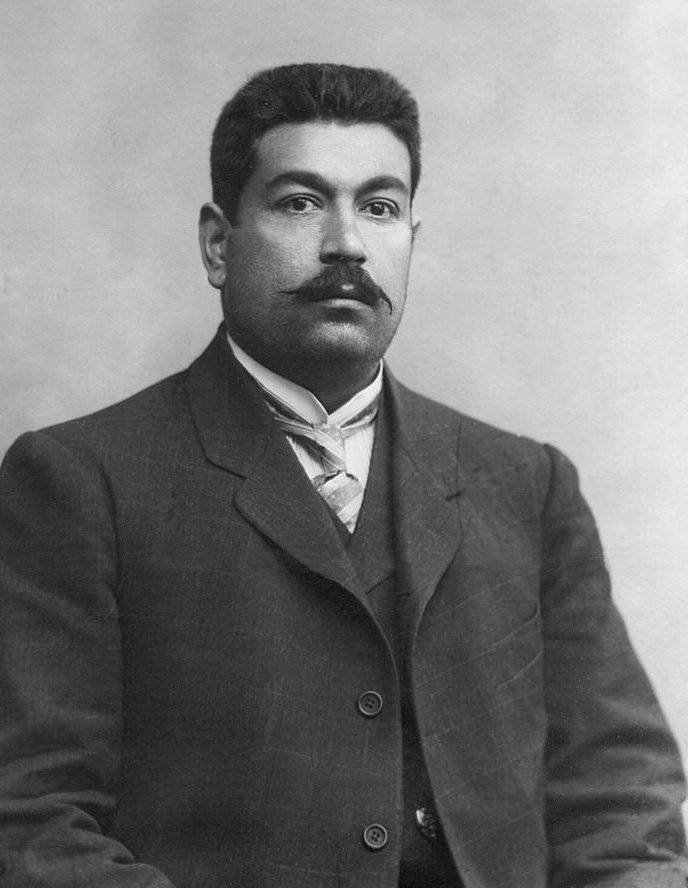

Member of Second Duma
- In office 6 February 1907 – October 1907
- Parliamentary group: Muslim Labor Group

Personal details
- Born: December 12, 1876 Əmircan, Baku Governorate, Russian Empire
- Died: January 28, 1935 (aged 58) Əmircan, Azerbaijan SSR
- Party: Popular Socialist Party

Zeynal Zeynalov (Azerbaijani: Zeynal Eynal oğlu Zeynalov, 1876–1935) was a politician, activist and member of Second Duma of Russian Empire in 1907.

== Life ==
He was born in Amirjan village of Baku Governorate in 1876 where he received primary education. Before politics, he was a turner, machinist, mechanic at the Rothschild oil fields in Balakhani. Later he served as the head of the oil field, had an income of up to 4 thousand rubles a year. He was not a member of the parties; although he sided with the Popular Socialist Party and Trudoviks, also associated with local Hümmət party.

== Career ==
He was elected to Second Duma on 6 February 1907. He continued to side with Popular Socialist Party and formed Muslim Labor Group within duma. Leading this six man group of Muslim socialists, he called for distribution of lands to peasants without any indemnity and protested oil discovered lands being forcibly taken from peasants by industrialists. He authored the "Duma" newspaper during his years in Duma.

He went abroad after dissolution of Duma and returned to Baku only in 1917 where he resumed his work in oil industry and led Muslim Social Democratic Party's Amirjan branch between 1918 and 1920. After Soviet takeover, he participated in several governmental organizations and taught at technical schools. He died on 28 January 1935 and was buried in Amirjan.
