= Murtuza Mukhtarov =

Azerbaijani oil industrialist and millionaire (1857–1920)

- Murtuza Muxtarov
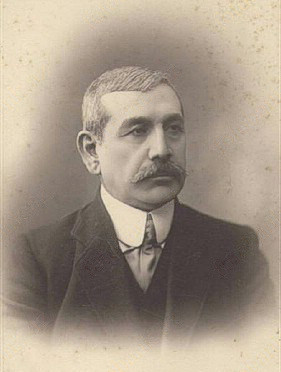
- Born: 1857; Amirjan, Baku uezd, Shemakha Governorate, Russian Empire
- Died: April, 1920; Palace of Happiness, Baku, Azerbaijan
- Cause of death: Gunshot wound
- Occupations: Oil industrialist, philanthropist
- Spouse: Liza Mukhtarova

Murtuza Mukhtarov (Azerbaijani: Murtuza Muxtarov; 1857? – April 1920) was an Azerbaijani oil industrialist and millionaire who built the Mukhtarov Palace in Baku and the Mukhtarov Mosque in Vladikavkaz. He was born into a poor family in a village of Amirjan near Baku. Mukhtarov managed to become one of the most reputable drilling experts in Baku through his ability and many years of experience. He set up his own drilling company in 1890 and then diversified into oil production. The company specialized in manufacturing machinery for derricks and in drilling oil wells. He was the author of several patents on drilling equipment - unique feat among oil industrialists of the time.

A business-savvy and enterprising millionaire, he funded schools and built mosques in Baku and the surrounding areas. Together with his wife, he sponsored the young singer Fatma Mukhtarova, who would later become a star of the Baku opera stage. In 1911–1912, he had a magnificent Gothic Revival mansion built for his wife, Liza Mukhtarova, designed by architect Józef Plośko. This residence, a celebrated example of Baku’s oil boom architecture, now functions as the Palace of Marriage Registrations. Mukhtarov committed suicide in his residence on April 28, 1920, after killing several Red Army soldiers during the Bolshevik takeover of Azerbaijan.

== Early life ==
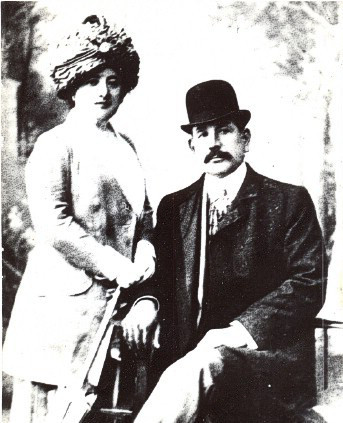
Muktharov with his wife

Murtuza Mukhtarov was born in 1857 in the village of Amirjan (around Baku) in a poor family. During his childhood, Murtuza and his brother Bala Ahmed transported cargoes from Baku to Tiflis. In 1874, after selling his car, Murtuza started working in one of the mines around Zabrat and Balakhani villages (near to Baku). An entrepreneur, Martov discovered the will of M. Mukhtarov and instructed him about the use of drilling equipment, and in a short time, he was appointed to a foreman. After a while, sold the mining workshop drilling rig to him. Murtuza Mukhtarov made several changes in the machinery that he took over. At that time, all the people of the Amirjan village helped him by collecting money. Because of his dedication, Murtuza became known by more people. During this period, he got more technical knowledge from different engineers who worked for him relevant to the demands of the century. The business and enterprising millionaire also learned a lot about technical drawing. When signing documents, he rarely wrote his entire surname, typically his signature consisting of three letters, "Mux". Like the other oil millionaires, Murtuza Mukhtarov has grown from the usual laborer to a millionaire. After a long period of working as a plasterer, he transported oil by using carts and finally engaged in small contracts and started to drill oil wells in Baku and other cities within the Russian Empire, such as Maykop and Grozny. Despite being born into a poor family and not having access to formal education, he managed to become a highly qualified, self-taught engineer and one of the best boring specialists in Baku. His enormous experience and shrewdness propelled him into his own business in 1890 when he founded what became a substantially sized oil company with two divisions, employing 2,500 workers to manufacture machinery for derricks and bore new oil wells.

== Activities ==
Mukhtarov has actively participated in the development of oil extraction technology in Baku. Without any high technical education, he was able to become an expert on oil drilling technologies. The "Podrat drilling" rig established in 1890 played a major role in drilling oil wells in Balakhani, Surakhani, Ramana, and Sabunchu oil districts of Baku. Most of the wells in these areas are drilled by the "Podrat Drill" rig. He was a talented self-taught inventor. The drilling tool that he invented was known all over the world under the name "Mukhtarov" and was exported to many countries (after the "Murtuza Mukhtarov" society, such societies as "Hammer", "Rapid", "Wotan" and "Robur" can be ranked among large contract drilling companies and mechanical workshops in the Russian Empire).

At that time he owned all the oil wells around the Baku-Buzovna railway. Thus the first station after Sabunchu is called "Mukhtarovka". In 1895 (for the first time in the world), he built a drilling rig with metal sticks and received copyright from the state. He then called his invention the "Baku Drilling System". At the end of the 19th century, Mukhtarov opened a drilling equipment plant in Bibiheybat, which was considered the first oil equipment enterprise at that time. He also built three-storeyed residential buildings for the workers near the plant, thereby creating new sources of labor and additional sources of income. An oil millionaire invented the wood chamfering machine in 1917. The equipment is being kept at the Mining Institute in St. Petersburg.

M. Mukhtarov was selling the products of his plant to foreign countries and bought most of the equipment from abroad, especially from America.

He was not only involved in the oil drilling process in Baku but also signed contracts with the local oil barons in Maykop and Grozny, and had technical and business relationships with the owners' factories and oil mines in the North Caucasus.

== Philanthropic works ==
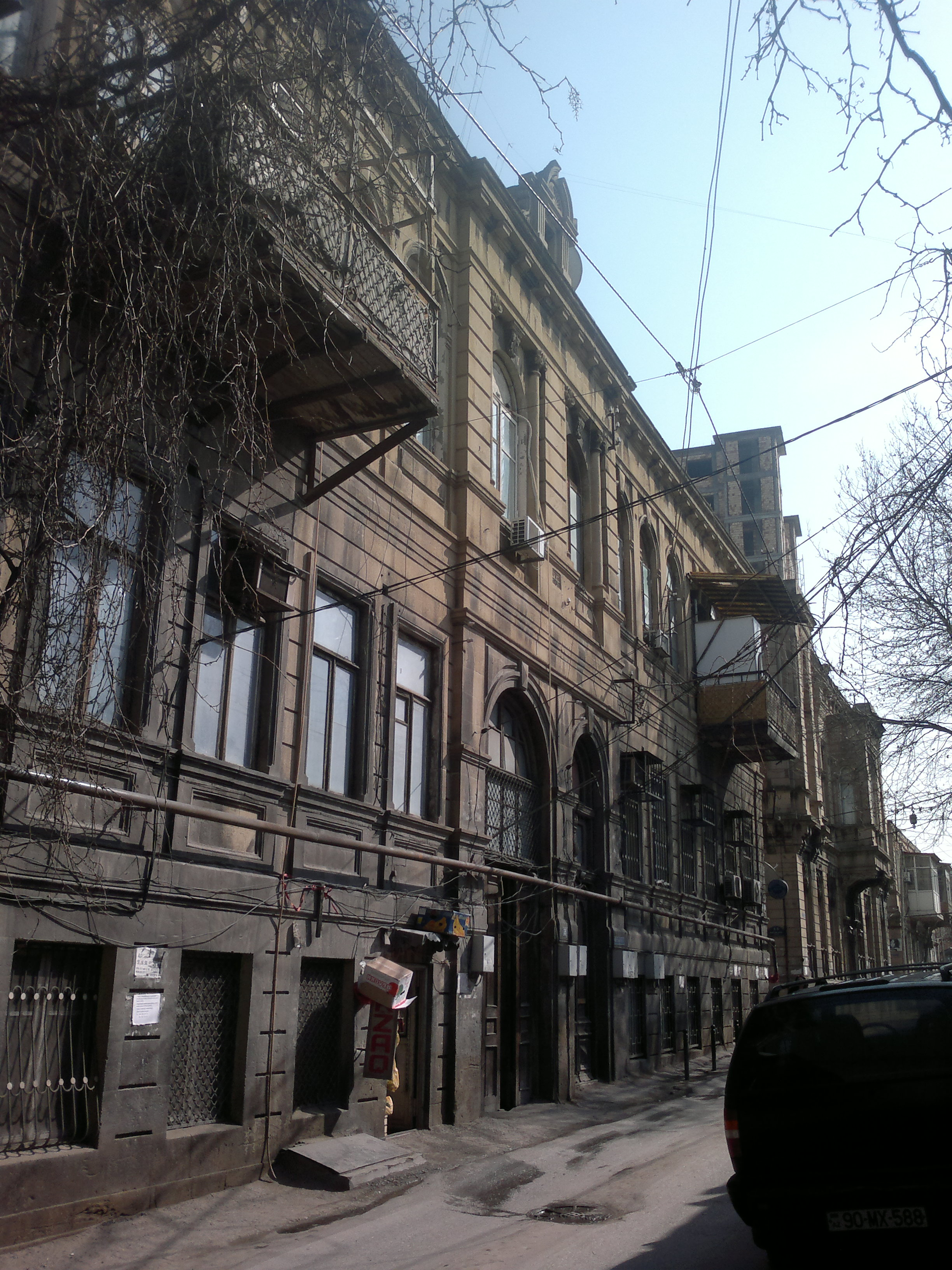
Street named after Murtuza Mukhtarov

M. Mukhtarov was involved in many philanthropic works. A mosque and school in Amirjan village (built in 1910) and 17 buildings in Absheron, a dome on the grave of Akhund Mirza Abu Turab in Pirhasan (Mardakan, Baku) a mosque in Vladikavkaz were built under his patronage. The Amirjan mosque with the minarets and their double balconies and decorations is very distinct as they rise 46 meters high. The workmanship in stone carving far exceeds that of any other mosque in Baku, the surrounding suburban areas, or, for that matter, in the entire country. Many mosques were destroyed during the Soviet period or were converted to other uses such as museums, but the Amirjan Mosque still stands today and is used as a place of worship. Murtuza Mukhtarov was the patron of Baku Realni College and Temirxan-Shura Gymnasium for Women and a member of the Society for the Spread of Literacy and Knowledge among the Mountain Dwellers. He was also a member of the St. Petersburg Muslim Charitable Society and the founder of 40 scholarships for the students of high and vocational schools. Murtuza Mukhtarov, who was well known as a benevolent and kind person earnest entrepreneur, left many magnificent buildings as a legacy. A number of buildings that are preserved up to this day in Baku and its suburbs, in many cities of Russia, and in several European countries are connected with his name. The mosque in Vladivostok city, beautiful and magnificent buildings in Kislovodks, and Florence, Italy are built with his money. Murtuza Mukhtarov actively participated in nearly all charity societies and gave financial assistance. Together with his wife, Liza-Khanum, known for her philanthropy, arranged a boarding school for poor and orphan girls inside the palace. In 1914, the Mukhtarovs' Palace became the residence of the first Female Moslem Philanthropic Society, founded by Liza-Khanum. They financially supported many of these girls so they could continue their education in Moscow and St. Petersburg. She was also an active member of the Society to Combat Mortality among Children.

== Family ==
While visiting Vladikavkaz, a town in southern Russia, Mukhtarov fell in love with an Ossetian noble lady, Liza-Khanum Taganova. But when Mukhtarov proposed, her parents refused. It didn't matter that he was wealthy. To them, he had not been born into nobility and did not come up to their social standing. Then, he undertook to build a magnificent mosque on the bank of the Terek River. Of course, afterward, it was impossible for the Taganovs to refuse him. As the couple did not have any children, they dedicated themselves to philanthropic works.

== Mukhtarov's Mansion ==
The Mukhtarov's Mansion is located in the center of Istiglaliyyat Avenue (Independence Avenue). Built in the early 1910s by Azerbaijan oil millionaire Murtuza Mukhtarov, it was inspired by the magnate's travels to Venice. Notable architect Jozef Ploshko designed this French Gothic edifice among a number of great buildings in the city. It housed a boarding school for poverty-stricken or orphaned girls (about 1914–1920) organized by the first Female Muslim Philanthropic Society, which Liza (Mukhtarov's wife) established (1914). During the Soviet period, when it was converted into Baku's Wedding Palace, the Residence took on a new life and character of its own, somehow reminiscent of its past. To this day, it continues to serve that purpose, and couples come to register their vows and make public their commitment of loyalty to one another in this majestic architectural landmark.

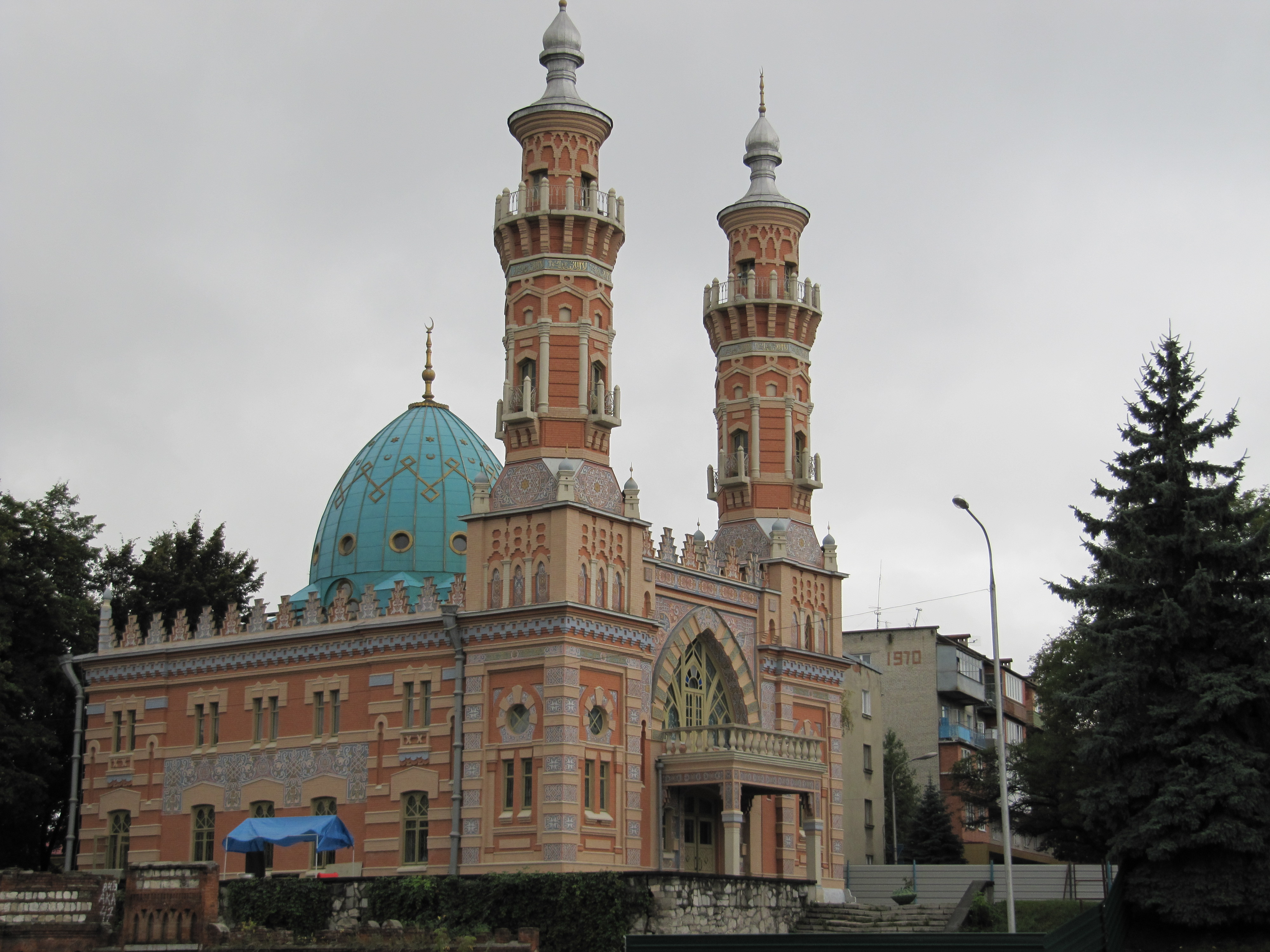
Mukhtarov Mosque

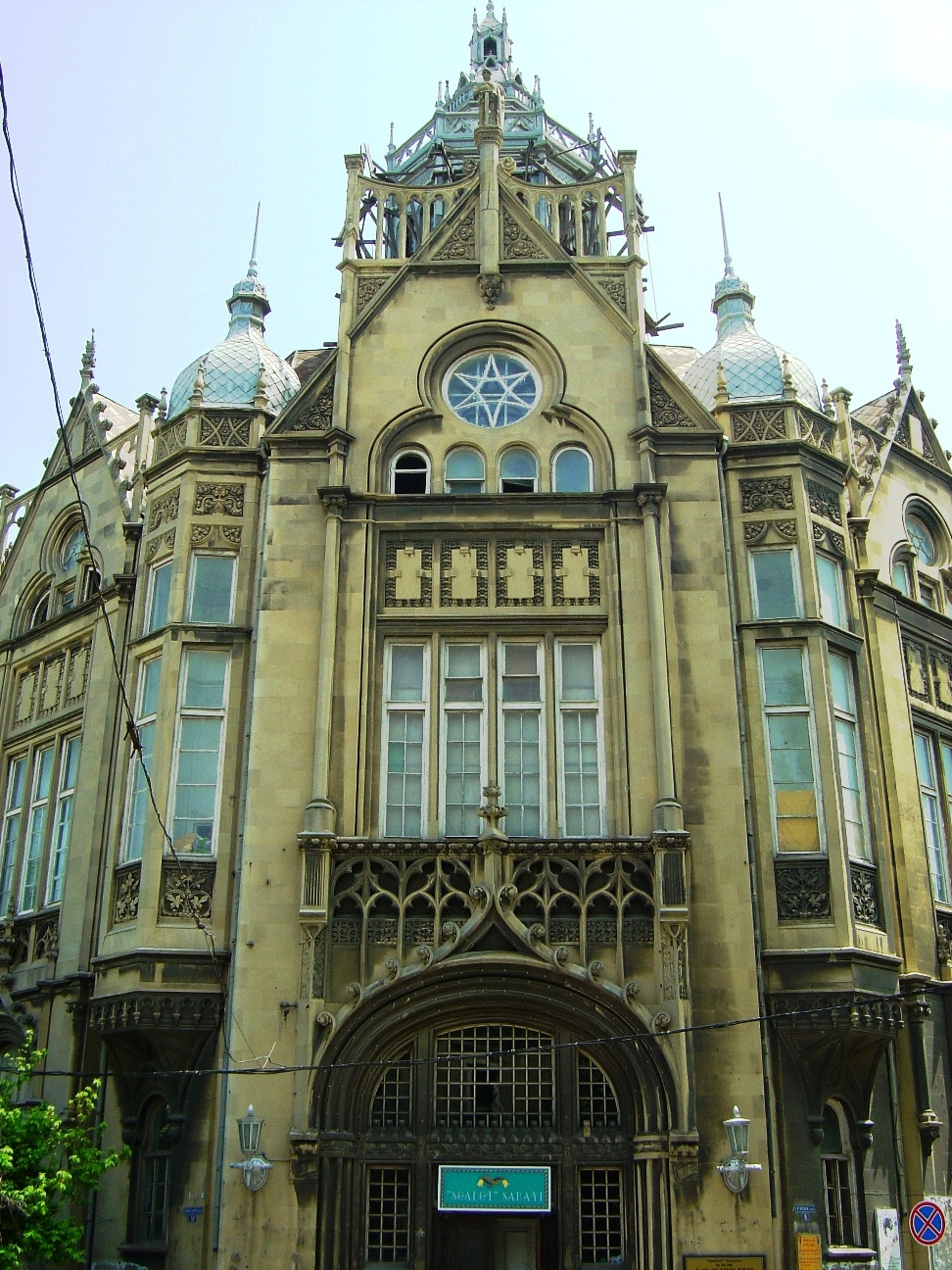
Mukhtarov Palace

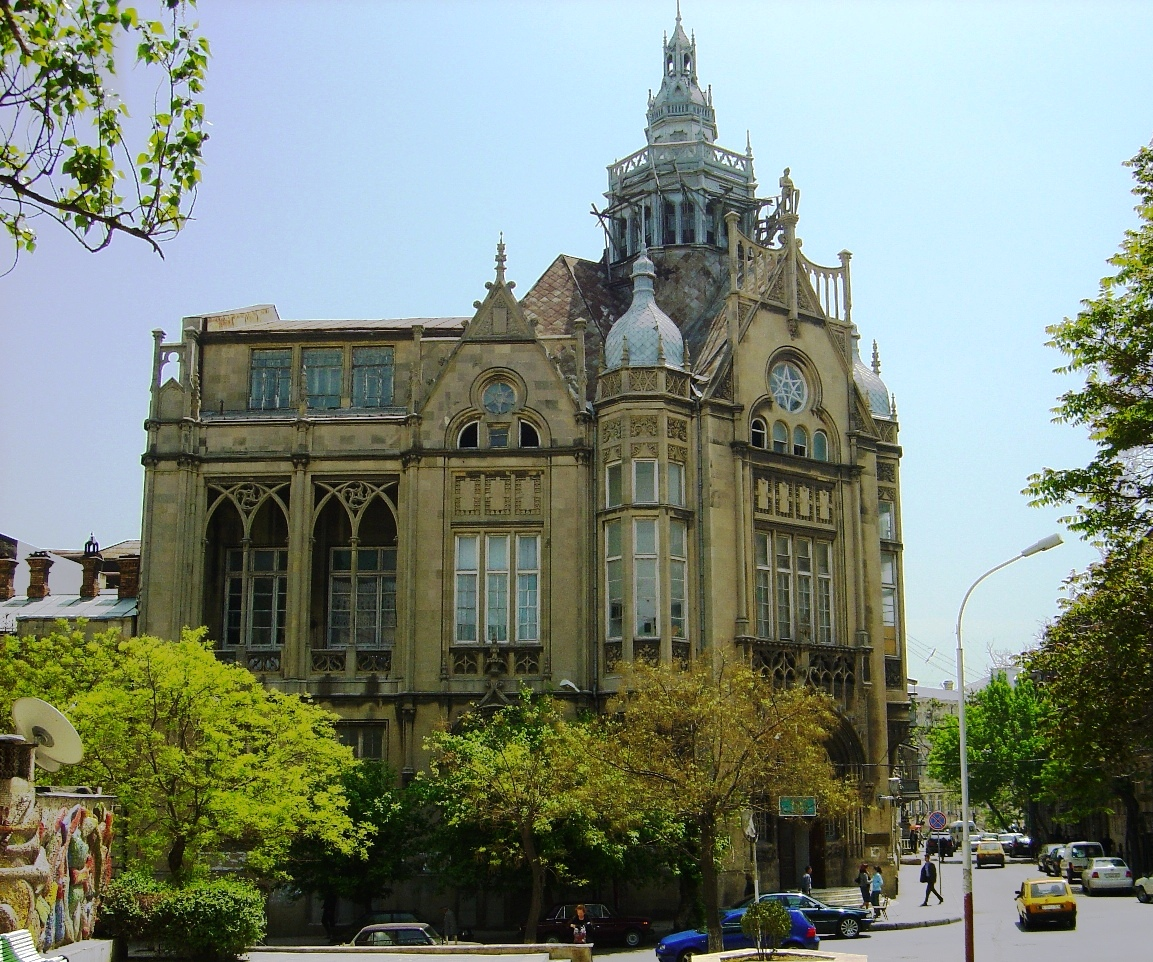
