= Əmircan, Baku =

Əmircan
- Municipality
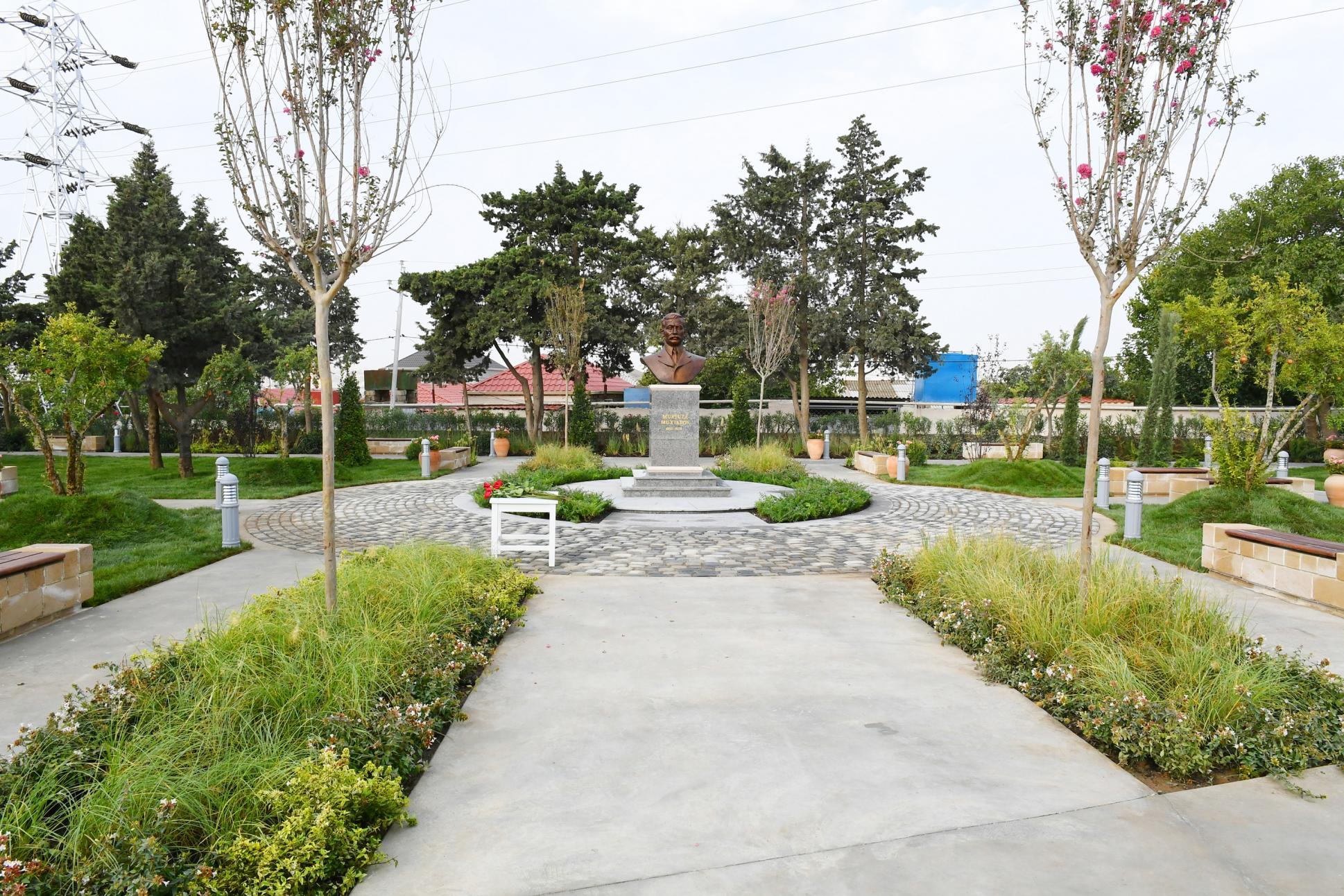
- The parк named after Murtuza Muкhtarov in Amirjan

- Location within Azerbaijan
- Coordinates: 40°25′35″N 49°59′01″E
- Country: Azerbaijan
- City: Baku
- Raion: Suraxanı

Population (2008)
  - Total: 28,203
- Time zone: UTC+4 (AZT)
  - Summer (DST): UTC+5 (AZT)

Əmircan (also, Amirabdzhan, Amiradzhan, Amiradzhany, Amircan, Amirdžan, Amirjan, and Amirdzhan) is a municipality near Baku, Azerbaijan. It has a population of 28,203.

In the 1886 official census 2283 ethnic tats were living here.

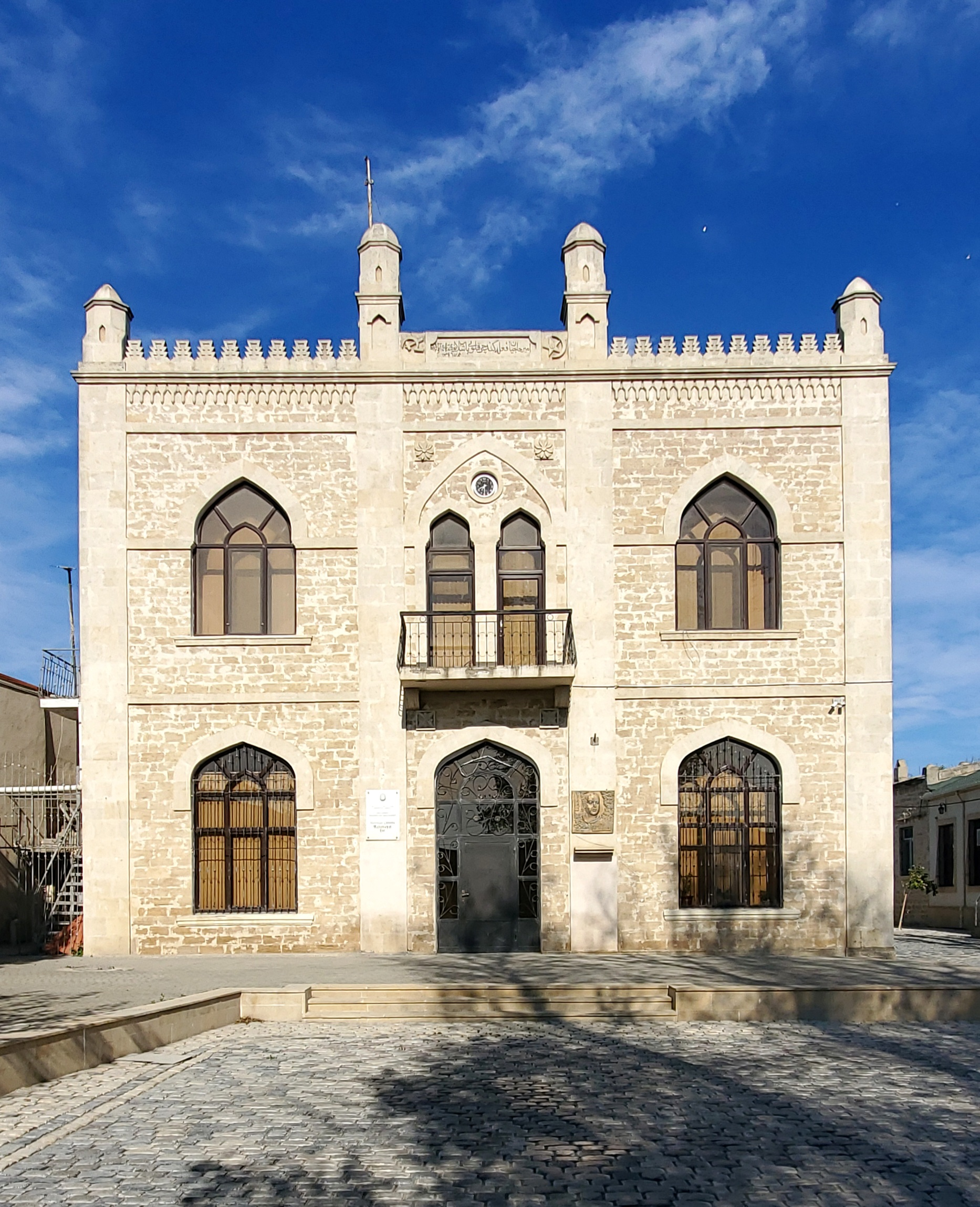
Amirjan House of Culture

== Notable natives ==
- Abbasgulu Bakikhanov - historian and writer, the founder of Azerbaijani scientific historiography.
- Sattar Bahlulzade - painter, People's Painter of Azerbaijan SSR (1964), the founder of contemporary Azerbaijani landscape painting.
- Albert Agarunov - National Hero of Azerbaijan
- Murtuza Mukhtarov - oil industrialist and millionaire
- Zeynal Zeynalov - politician

== Monuments ==
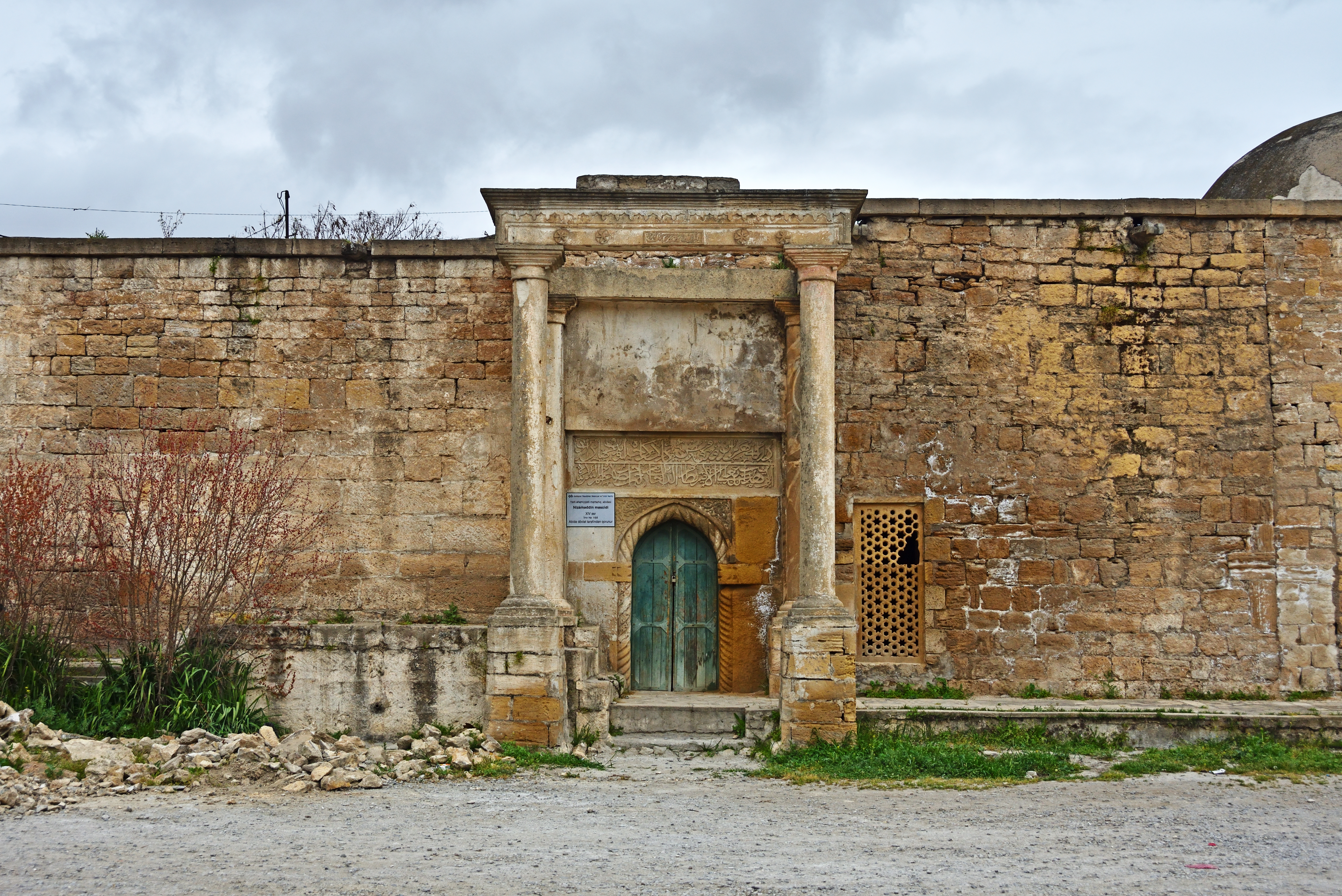
Nizamaddin Mosque

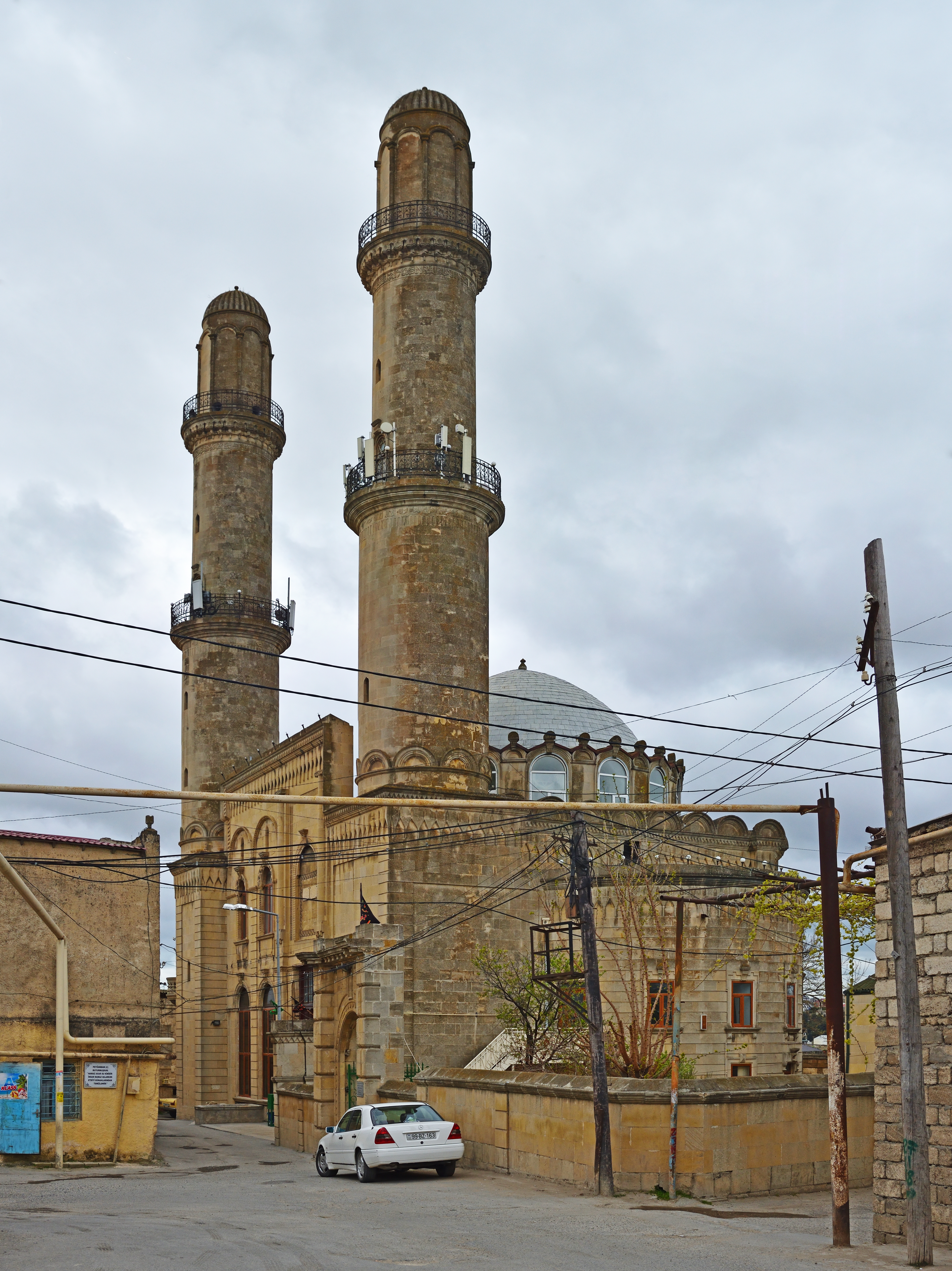
Murtuza Mukhtarov Mosque

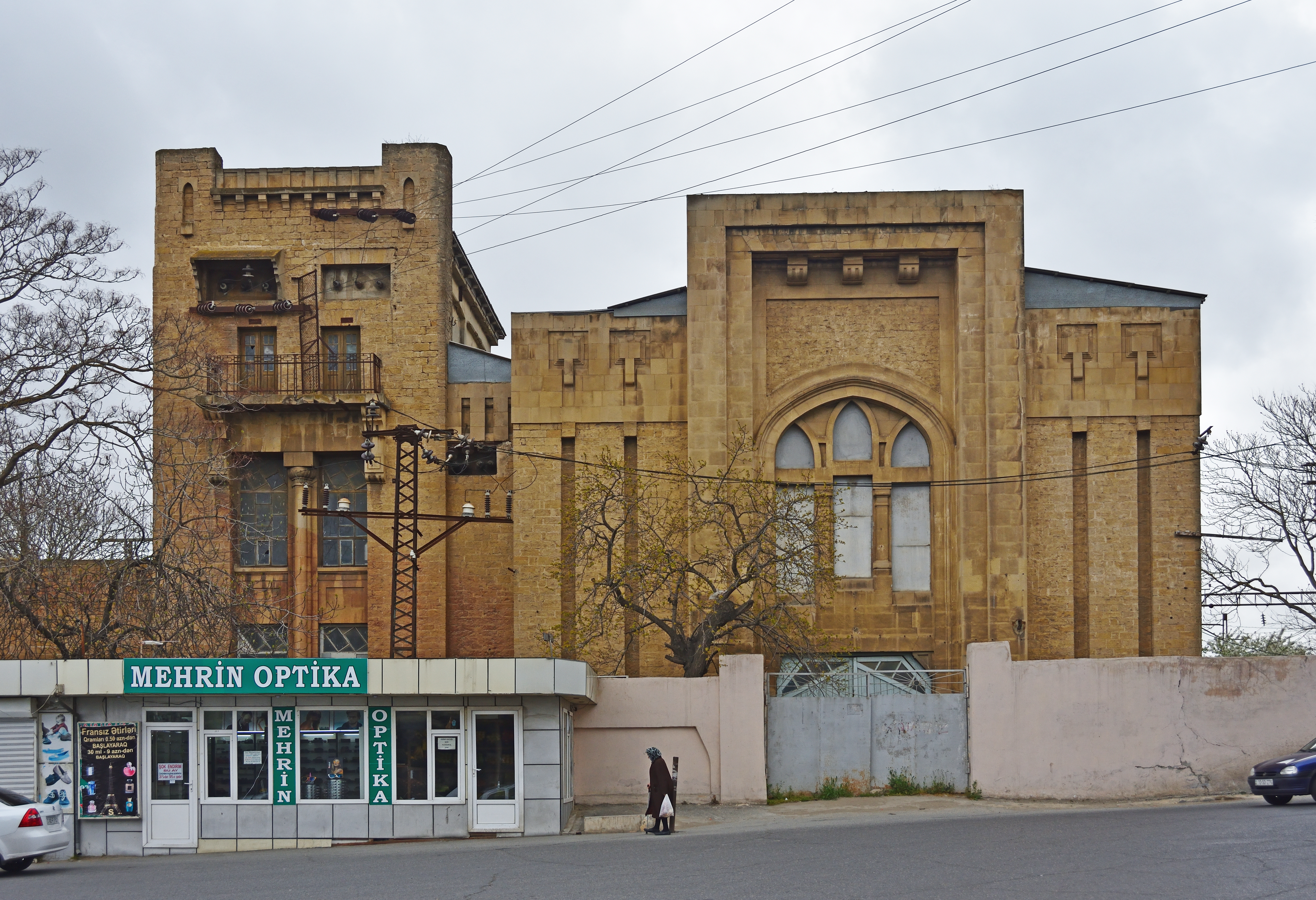
Amirjan Railway Station

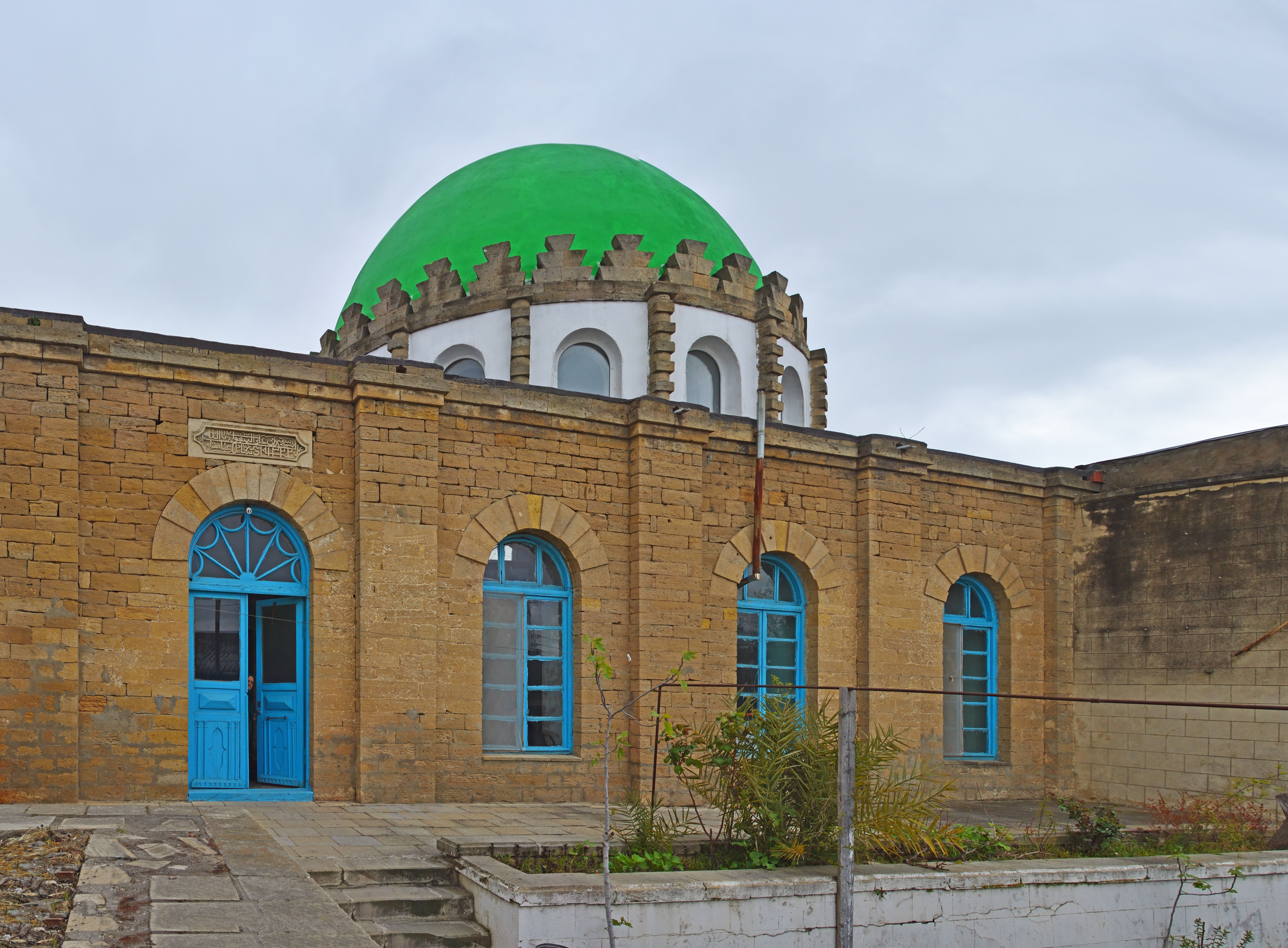
Bunyadlılar Mosque
