= List of cathedrals in Azerbaijan =

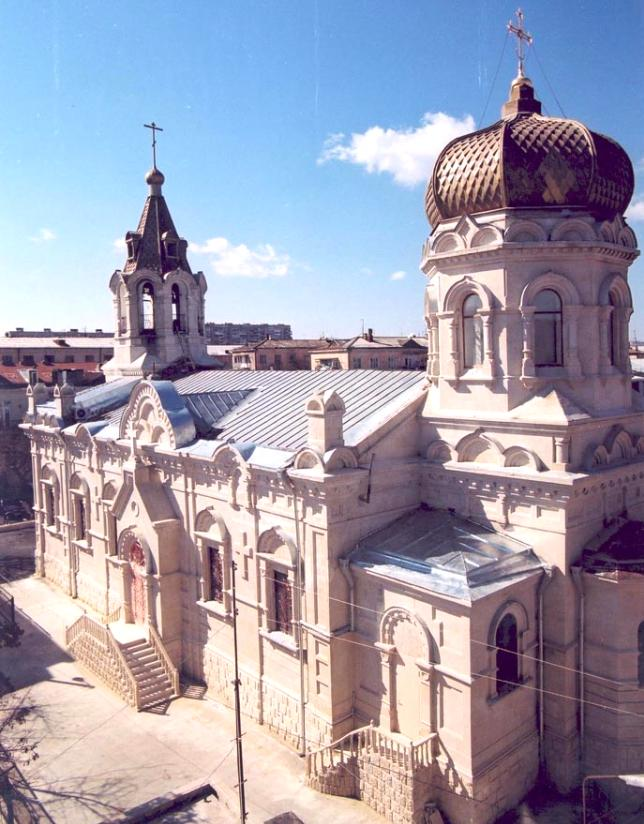
Holy Myrrhbearers Cathedral in Baku.

This is the list of cathedrals in Azerbaijan sorted by denomination.

== Armenian Apostolic ==
- Ghazanchetsots Cathedral, Shusha, Nagorno-Karabakh

=== Former cathedral ===
- Saint Thaddeus and Bartholomew Cathedral, Baku

== Eastern Orthodox ==
=== Russian Orthodox Church ===
Cathedrals of the Russian Orthodox Church in Azerbaijan:

- Holy Myrrhbearers Cathedral, Baku

==== Former cathedral ====
- Alexander Nevsky Cathedral, Baku (destroyed 1936)

== Catholic ==
Cathedrals of the Catholic Church in Azerbaijan:

- Church of the Immaculate Conception, Baku (Pro-Cathedral)

== See also ==
- Lists of cathedrals by country
- Christianity in Azerbaijan
