= Qəsil =

Qəsil or Kasil’ may refer to:

- Aşağı Qəsil, Azerbaijan
- Orta Qəsil, Azerbaijan
- Yuxarı Qəsil, Azerbaijan
- Gasil, Alborz Province, Iran
- Kasıl, Palu

Qasil may refer to:

- Qasil, California in the United States (a former Native American village)
