= Yeniarx =

Yeniarx may refer to:

- Yeniarx, Agdash, Azerbaijan
  - Yeniarx, Aşağı Zeynəddin, Azerbaijan
  - Yeniarx, Qobuüstü, Azerbaijan
- Yeniarx, Goychay, Azerbaijan
