= Ərəbşəki =

- Location within Azerbaijan
- Coordinates: 40°34′01″N 47°14′28″E
- Country: Azerbaijan
- Rayon: Agdash
- Time zone: UTC+4 (AZT)
  - Summer (DST): UTC+5 (AZT)

Ərəbşəki (also, Arabsheki) is a village in the Agdash Rayon of Azerbaijan. The village forms part of the municipality of Eymur.
