= 1667 Shamakhi earthquake =

1667 seismic event centered near present-day Shamakhi, Azerbaijan

1667 Şamaxı earthquake
- Location within Azerbaijan
- Local date: November 25, 1667
- Magnitude: 6.9 M_{s}
- Depth: 12 km (7.5 mi)
- Epicenter: 40.6°N 48.6°E
- Areas affected: Shamakhi, Shirvan, Safavid Iran (present-day Azerbaijan Republic)
- Max. intensity: MMI X (Extreme)
- Casualties: 80,000

The 1667 Shamakhi earthquake occurred on 25 November 1667 with an epicenter close to the city of Shamakhi, Azerbaijan (then part of Safavid Iran). It had an estimated surface-wave magnitude of 6.9 and a maximum felt intensity of X (Extreme) on the Mercalli intensity scale. An estimated 80,000 people died.

== Tectonic setting ==
Azerbaijan lies at the northern boundary of the broad zone of collision between the Arabian plate and the Eurasian plate. The Greater Caucasus mountain range marks this boundary and has been formed in the last 5 million years. The current deformation front is formed by the Kula fold and thrust belt, which has been active for the last 1.5 million years.Long term convergence rates across this belt have been estimated to be in the range 7–14 mm per year, while GPS data give a current convergence rate of 10 mm per year near the Caspian Sea, decreasing westwards to 4 mm per year near Tbilisi.

== Earthquake ==
The earthquake had an estimated magnitude of 6.9 M_{s}, although estimates as high as M8.0 have been suggested. Paleoseismological investigations near Agsu, across the trace of the frontal thrust fault have found evidence for two earthquakes that may represent the events in 1668 and 1902.

The area of shaking that reached XI on the Medvedev–Sponheuer–Karnik scale (MSK) has been estimated to be in the range 100–120 km, while the zone that reached X MSK was at least 150 km long. Mishlesh in Dagestan was affected by an earthquake at about the same period as the one that struck Shamakhi and if this was the same event, a rupture of 150 km could be indicated.

Aftershocks continued through 1668, until early 1671.

=== Date ===
The date of the earthquake varies between sources. The year of this event ranges from 1667 to 1669 in historical sources. From an analysis of all available historical material, Nikonov in 1982 preferred 14 January 1668. Other cited dates are November 1667 (unspecified day) and 17 December 1667.

== Damage ==
The city of Shamakhi is reported to have been completely destroyed. The city walls were said to have collapsed, as were the fortress and the congregational mosque. Baku was also affected with the wall of a palace reported collapsed. Landslides were mentioned in historical sources and some of the roads were so badly damaged that caravans had to find alternative routes.

A death toll of 80,000 people is widely reported in sources but a lower value of 6,000–8,000 deaths has also been mentioned.

== See also ==
- List of earthquakes in Azerbaijan
