= Christianity in Azerbaijan =

Christianity in Azerbaijan is a minority religion. Christians, estimated between 280,000 and 450,000 (3.1%–4.8%), are mostly Russian and Georgian Orthodox. There is also a small Protestant Christian community which mostly came from Muslim backgrounds. Due to the very hostile relations between Azerbaijan and Armenia, Armenian Christians have practically entirely fled the country, and so the Christians in Azerbaijan are members of various other groups, mostly Russians and Georgians, but also some ethnic Azerbaijani Christians.

== History ==
Christianity spread to territory of present-day Azerbaijan in the first years of the new era. The first stage of this period is called the period of Apostles Bartholomew and Thaddeus (the same apostles who Christianized Armenia), who spread the new religion. This was done by the benediction of the first patriarch of Jerusalem, Yegub.

In the year 313, King Urnair of Caucasian Albania declared Christianity to be the state religion, granting official church status to the Albanian Apostolic Church.

The first church in Azerbaijan was founded in Guis (Kish) in the late 9th century.

The Albanian Apostolic Church was shut down in the early 19th century by the Russian government.

The Lutheran missionary Karl Gottlieb Pfander learned Azerbaijani very quickly during his stay in Shusha.

=== 20th century ===
Masum bey Qayibov famously converted to Christianity. Another influential Azerbaijani Christian was Banine. In 1987, Ujal Hagverdiyev converted to Christianity.

After gaining independence in 1991, state registration of Christian communities was carried out in Azerbaijan. Christians in Azerbaijan came from different ethnicities and denominations. This included ethnically Turkic Azerbaijanis who followed Christianity. Azerbaijani Christians were largely divided between Protestantism, Catholicism, or Eastern Orthodoxy.

From 1991 to 1999, approximately 5,000 Azerbaijanis converted to various Protestant churches. Protestant Christianity had been one of the most common denominations for converts. In 2012, Vladimir Fekete stated that many Azerbaijani Christians were Catholic. In 2022, at the Cathedral of the Holy Martyrs in Baku, the Azerbaijani language was used to recite prayers for the first time.

There was also many Iranian Azerbaijanis who converted to Christianity, which was prohibited and punishable by death in the Islamic Republic of Iran.

In Azerbaijan, there was a historic divide between Protestant Christians. The Protestants often worshipped in two separate groups, Russian speakers and Azerbaijani speakers. The two groups had little-to-no contact. The Russian speakers were ethnically diverse but mostly Slavic, while the Azerbaijani speakers were ethnically Turkic. The Turkish language also played a role in the spread of Christianity in Azerbaijan. Christianity was attractive to Azerbaijani converts who saw Christianity as very compatible with the Azerbaijani way of life.

In 2008, Behbud Mustafayev converted to Catholicism from Islam. In 2017, he was ordained a priest by Pope Francis in St. Peter's Basilica. He became the first ethnic Azerbaijani ordained as a Catholic priest.

Azerbaijani Christians played a role in the rise of Azerbaijani nationalism, and often hosted secular and national holidays in their churches, including the raising of Azerbaijani flags on Flag Day. After the Second Nagorno-Karabakh War, Azerbaijani Christians held a prayer for Azerbaijani soldiers in a Nagorno-Karabakh church, sparking much controversy among Armenians.

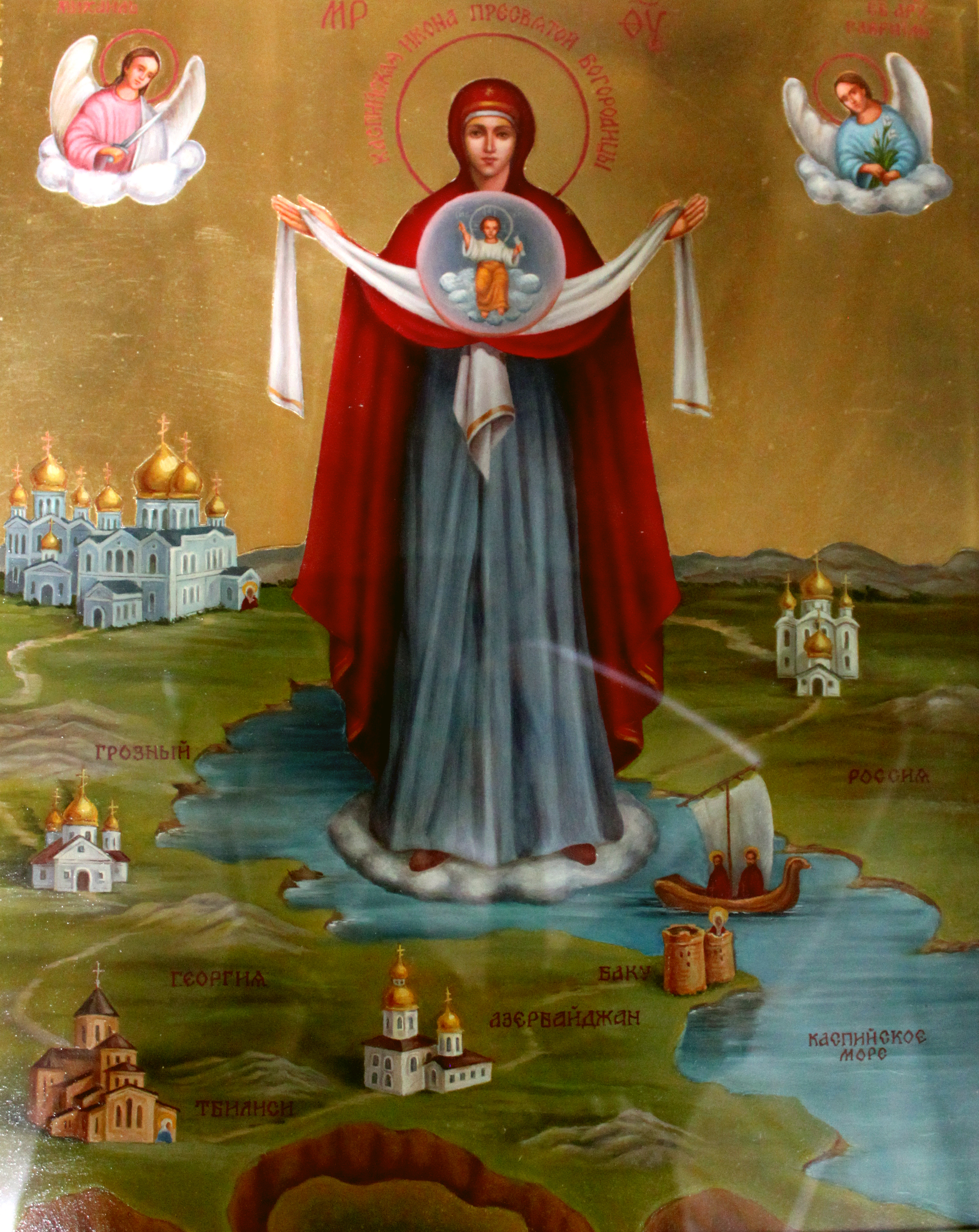
St. Mary Protector of Caucasus icon in Archangel Michael church, Baku.

== Eastern Orthodoxy ==
Adherents of Eastern Orthodox Christianity in Azerbaijan are mainly ethnic Russians and Georgians. Russian Orthodox communities belong to the Russian Orthodox Church in Azerbaijan. Entire territory of Azerbaijan is under ecclesiastical jurisdiction of the Russian Orthodox Eparchy of Baku and Azerbaijan, centered in the Holy Myrrhbearers Cathedral in Baku.

== Oriental Orthodoxy ==
Adherents of Oriental Orthodox Christianity in Azerbaijan were mainly ethnic Armenians. The Armenian Apostolic Church had no community besides the Nagorno-Karabakh Republic until the ethnic cleansing of Armenians in Nagorno-Karabakh. Before the outbreak of the war, Armenians formed the largest Christian population in the country. Today, Armenian churches in Azerbaijan remain closed, because of the massacres of Armenians in the 1990s and generally being banned from entering Azerbaijan. During the First Nagorno-Karabakh War, despite the constitutional guarantees against religious discrimination, numerous acts of vandalism against the Armenian Apostolic Church were reported throughout Azerbaijan. At the height of the Baku pogrom in 1990, the Armenian Church of St. Gregory Illuminator was set on fire, but was restored in 2004 and is currently used as library.

As of February 2026, there is no bishop in the Armenian Diocese of Azerbaijan.

== Other denominations ==
There is only one congregation in the Catholic Church in Azerbaijan: a church in Baku was opened in 2007.

There are eleven Molokan communities. The Molokans are a Protestant minority which, much like other Protestants, center their beliefs on the Bible and reject church hierarchy. There is also a German Lutheran community, likely to number less than 7,000 Protestants. According to Rev. Elnur Jabiyev, the former general secretary of the Baptist Union in Azerbaijan, up to 2010, there were eight or nine evangelical churches in Baku but these have now been prevented from openly meeting together by the authorities.

About 2.5% of the population belong to the Russian Orthodox Church (1998). The Russian Orthodox Church in Azerbaijan has the Eparchy of Baku and the Caspian region with a seat in Azerbaijan. Among the famous landmark Russian churches are Church of Michael Archangel and the Holy Myrrhbearers Cathedral; the once grand Alexander Nevsky Cathedral has been destroyed by the communists in 1937.

The Albanian-Udi Church, established in 2003, is of the Udi people minority in Azerbaijan.

== See also ==
- Church of Caucasian Albania
- Russian Orthodox Church in Azerbaijan
- Georgian Orthodox Church in Azerbaijan
- Catholic Church in Azerbaijan
- List of Armenian churches in Azerbaijan
- Molokan
- Religion in Azerbaijan
- Christianity by country
