= Zeynəddin, Agdash =

Zeynəddin, Agdash may refer to:

- Aşağı Zeynəddin
- Yuxarı Zeynəddin
