= Tofiqi =

- Municipality
- Location within Azerbaijan
- Coordinates: 40°34′38″N 47°32′17″E
- Country: Azerbaijan
- Rayon: Agdash

Population
  - Total: 1,278
- Time zone: UTC+4 (AZT)
  - Summer (DST): UTC+5 (AZT)

Tofiqi (also known as Tofiki and Toyfiki) is a village and municipality in the Agdash Rayon of Azerbaijan. It has a population of 1,278.
