= Diocese of Baku and Azerbaijan =

orthodox
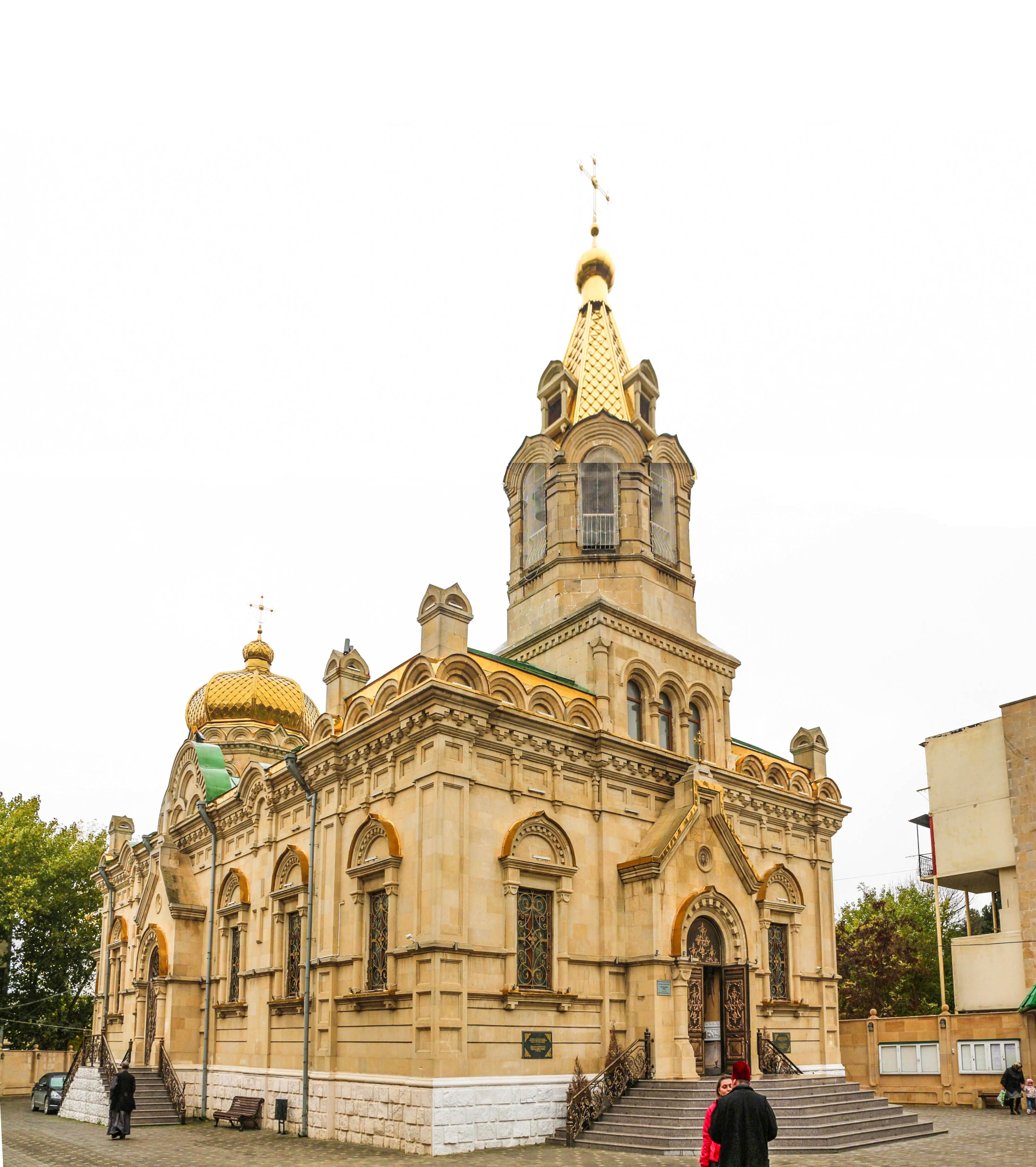
- Holy Myrrhbearers Cathedral in Baku

Location
- Country: Azerbaijan
- Headquarters: Holy Myrrhbearers Cathedral

Statistics
- Parishes: 1
- Churches: 6

Information
- First holder: Paul (Vilkovsky) (1919 - 1923)
- Denomination: Russian Orthodox
- Established: 1919

Current leadership
- Bishop: Aleksiy Smirnov

Website
- az.pravoslavie.az

Diocese of Baku and Azerbaijan (Russian: Бакинская и Азербайджанская епархия, Azerbaijani: Bakı və Azərbaycan yeparxiyası) is a diocese of the Russian Orthodox Church in Azerbaijan. Majority of its members are ethnic Russians of Azerbaijan. Entire territory of Azerbaijan is under ecclesiastical jurisdiction of the Russian Orthodox Eparchy of Baku and Azerbaijan, centered in the Holy Myrrhbearers Cathedral in Baku. The Church of Michael Archangel also exist in Baku. Aleksiy Smirnov is the current bishop.

== History ==
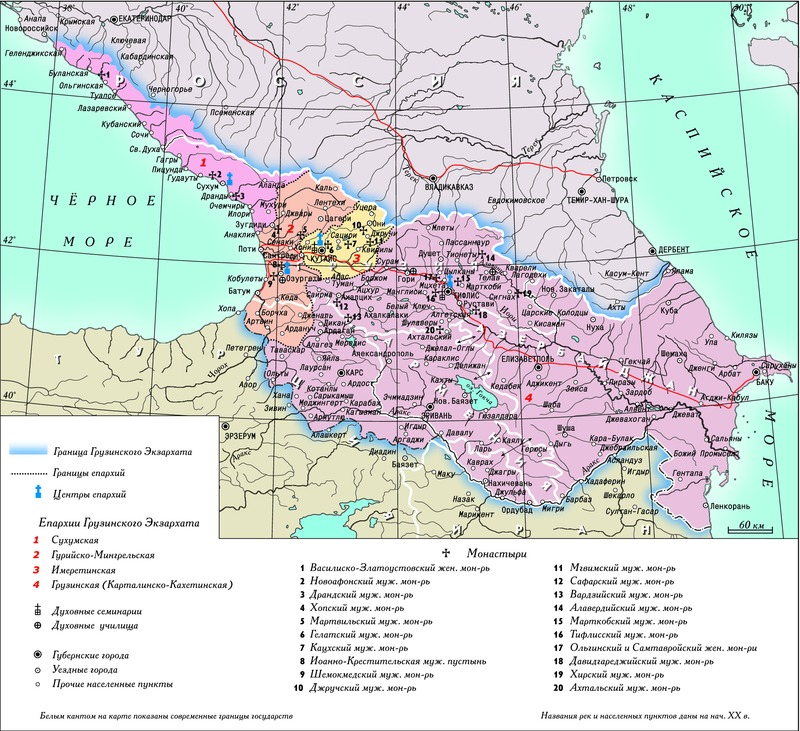
During the 19th century, the Georgian Exarchate of the Russian Orthodox Church included the territory of modern-day Azerbaijan

Historically, Azerbaijan used to be part of the Russian Empire and the USSR. The first Russian Orthodox church in Baku was built in 1815, two years after the Russo-Persian War (1804-1813) and the out coming Treaty of Gulistan, by which Qajar Iran ceded swaths of its Caucasian territories to Russia, which included Baku. Russian Orthodox churches had been built in Ganja and Şamaxı previously. Since the entire region of Caucasus was under the Russian rule, jurisdiction of Georgian Exarchate was expanded, encompassing territories of modern-day Georgia, Armenia and Azerbaijan. In 1905, Eparchy of Baku, nowadays Baku and Caspian Eparchy, was established.

In the spring of 1917, the Georgian Patriarchate was recreated, but only for the Georgian part of the Exarchate. Russian Orthodox Church and its exarch Platon (Rozhdestvensky) kept their jurisdiction over non-Georgian parts of the Caucasian region, and for those territories Caucasian Exarchate of the Russian Orthodox Church was created in the summer of 1917, with metropolitan Platon of Tbilisi and Baku as Exarch of Caucasus. In the spring of 1918, he was succeeded by metropolitan Cyril (Smirnov) as new metropolitan of Tbilisi and Baku, and Exarch of Caucasus, but after his transfer to another post in the spring of 1920 no exarch was appointed.

There used to be an Alexander Nevsky Cathedral in Baku. In the Soviet area, there was persecution of Christians. In 1944, a Russian Orthodox church was reopened in Baku. In 2011, ecclesiastical jurisdiction of the local Russian eparchy (diocese) was adjusted to political borders of Azerbaijan, and official name was changed to Russian Orthodox Eparchy of Baku and Azerbaijan.

== See also ==
- Christianity in Azerbaijan
- Religion in Azerbaijan
- Roman Catholicism in Azerbaijan
- Russian Orthodox Church
