= Qaraqan Şıxlar =

- Municipality
- Location within Azerbaijan
- Coordinates: 40°39′N 47°33′E
- Country: Azerbaijan
- Rayon: Agdash

Population
  - Total: 1,892
- Time zone: UTC+4 (AZT)
  - Summer (DST): UTC+5 (AZT)

Qaraqan Şıxlar (also, Qarağan Şıxlar and Karagan-Shykhlar) is a village and municipality in the Agdash Rayon of Azerbaijan. It has a population of 1,892. The municipality consists of the villages of Qaraqan Şıxlar and Qaraqan Sədi.
