= Korarx =

- Village
- Location within Azerbaijan
- Coordinates: 40°40′47″N 47°25′45″E
- Country: Azerbaijan
- District: Agdash
- Municipality: Qolqəti

Population
  - Total: 586
- Time zone: UTC+4 (AZT)

Korarx (also, Kerarkh and Korarkh) is a village and municipality in the Agdash Rayon of Azerbaijan. It has a population of 586.
