= Əmirarx =

- Municipality
- Location within Azerbaijan
- Coordinates: 40°33′33″N 47°22′33″E
- Country: Azerbaijan
- Rayon: Agdash

Population
  - Total: 1,113
- Time zone: UTC+4 (AZT)
  - Summer (DST): UTC+5 (AZT)

Əmirarx (also, Amirarkh and Emirarkh) is a village and municipality in the Agdash Rayon of Azerbaijan. It has a population of 1,113.
