= Bulaqotağı =

- Location within Azerbaijan
- Coordinates: 40°39′N 47°32′E
- Country: Azerbaijan
- Rayon: Agdash
- Time zone: UTC+4 (AZT)
  - Summer (DST): UTC+5 (AZT)

Bulaqotağı (also, Bulagotagi and Bulagotagy) is a village in the Agdash Rayon of Azerbaijan.
