= Qaraqan Sədi =

- Location within Azerbaijan
- Coordinates: 40°38′N 47°32′E
- Country: Azerbaijan
- Rayon: Agdash
- Time zone: UTC+4 (AZT)
  - Summer (DST): UTC+5 (AZT)

Qaraqan Sədi (also, Qarağan Sədi, Karagan Saadi, and Karagan-Sedi) is a village in the Agdash Rayon of Azerbaijan. The village forms part of the municipality of Qaraqan Şıxlar.
