= Qayibov =

Qayibov is an Azerbaijani surname. Notable people with the surname include:

- Masum bey Qayibov (1864–1915), Azerbaijani military officer
- Mirza Huseyn Afandi Qayibov (1830–1917), Azerbaijani clergyman, literary critic, publicist and enlightener

== See also ==
- Gayibov
