= Türyançay =

- Location within Azerbaijan
- Coordinates: 40°42′21″N 47°32′32″E
- Country: Azerbaijan
- Rayon: Agdash
- Municipality: Dəhnəxəlil
- Time zone: UTC+4 (AZT)

Türyançay (also, Turyançay and Turianchay) is a village in the Agdash Rayon of Azerbaijan. The village forms part of the municipality of Dəhnəxəlil.
