= Mövdüt =

- Location within Azerbaijan
- Coordinates: 40°30′57″N 47°18′26″E
- Country: Azerbaijan
- Rayon: Agdash
- Time zone: UTC+4 (AZT)
  - Summer (DST): UTC+5 (AZT)

Mövdüt (also known as Modut) is a village in the Agdash Rayon of Azerbaijan.
