= Guva =

Guva may refer to:

- Guava
- Cüvə, Azerbaijan
- Guva, an underground prison cell used to hold errant Knights of St. John, located in the Fort St Angelo, Birgu, Malta.
