= Bəylik, Agdash =

Coordinates: 40°36′25″N 47°30′20″E

Bəylik
- Municipality
- Location within Azerbaijan
- Country: Azerbaijan
- Rayon: Agdash

Population
  - Total: 786
- Time zone: UTC+4 (AZT)
  - Summer (DST): UTC+5 (AZT)

Bəylik is a village in the municipality of Qulbəndə in the Agdash Rayon of Azerbaijan.
