= Qobuüstü =

Coordinates: 40°43′N 47°18′E

- Municipality
- Location within Azerbaijan
- Country: Azerbaijan
- Rayon: Agdash

Population
  - Total: 1,083
- Time zone: UTC+4 (AZT)
  - Summer (DST): UTC+5 (AZT)

Qobuüstü is a village and municipality in the Agdash Rayon of Azerbaijan. It has a population of 1,345. The municipality consists of the villages of Qobuüstü and Yeniarx.
