= Visit of Muhammad Oljaitu to Baku =

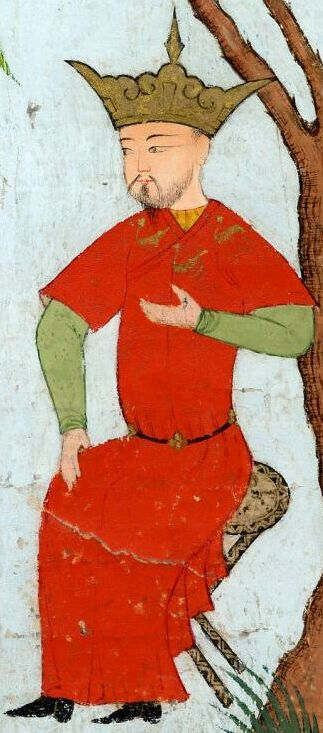
Miniature depiction of Ilkhanate ruler, Muhammad Oljaitu (1304–1316 CE).

The Ilkhanid ruler Muhammad Oljaitu (1304–1316) visited the city of Baku, which was part of his empire, in 1309. His decree, which was inscribed on the wall of the Juma Mosque in the Icherisheher, exempted the people of Baku from various taxes. Nasir Bakuvi wrote a poem in the Azerbaijani language in the form of a mukhammas, dated to 1306–1310, about Oljaitu's visit to Baku and the improvements he carried out there. Muhammad ibn Mahmud, in his work Nafais al-Funun, described the sultan's encounter with a dervish involved in the oil business.

== Background ==
At the beginning of the 14th century, the Shirvanshah state and the city of Baku, which was part of it, were within the Ilkhanate Empire. During the Mongol rule, the economic situation in Shirvan was difficult. The imposition of heavy taxes and the repeated collection of these taxes, as well as the war with the Golden Horde, worsened the economic situation, leading the population to hide in mountains and forests, and when found, they were slaughtered.

One of the sources proving the poor situation in Shirvan during this period is the inscription in the Juma Mosque of Ancient Baku (Icherisheher). According to this inscription, Muhammad Oljaitu (AH 1304–1316), by his yarligh (decree), exempted the people of Baku from various taxes. The tax exemption possibly occurred during Olcaytu's visit to Baku. Although the exact date of Oljaitu 's issuance of the yarligh is not known, his visit to Baku is confirmed by historical sources. It is assumed that it is related to his stop in Gulustan in 1309 upon returning from Arran. The text in the inscription is not the full part of the yarligh, but an abbreviated section; however, unlike in Mongol yarlighs where the ruler speaks in the third person, in this inscription it is written in the first person.

During the Ilkhanid period, oil wells were taken from local entrepreneurs and leased out. As a result, the leaseholders brutally exploited both the mines and the peasants bound to work there. Consequently, the productive capacity of the oil fields deteriorated, which negatively affected oil production. Therefore, Oljaitu's yarligh also exempted Baku from the oil tax. The aim was to revive the productive forces of Baku and Shirvan.

In his work "Nafais al-Funun," Muhammad ibn Mahmud describes Sultan Muhammad Oljaitu's encounter with a dervish in Baku as follows:

One of the dervishes was digging his own oil well within the boundaries of Baku. He sustained his livelihood from the income he obtained and hosted guests who visited him. Once, when the sultan came to Baku, the dervish, as was his custom, went to see him. The sultan wanted to give him a gift, but the dervish refused the gift for this reason: 'Since I am provided for by my own income, I have no need for surplus.' His answer pleased the sultan. After learning the amount of the dervish's income, the sultan admitted: '...truly, rulership belongs to you...'

== Juma Mosque inscription ==
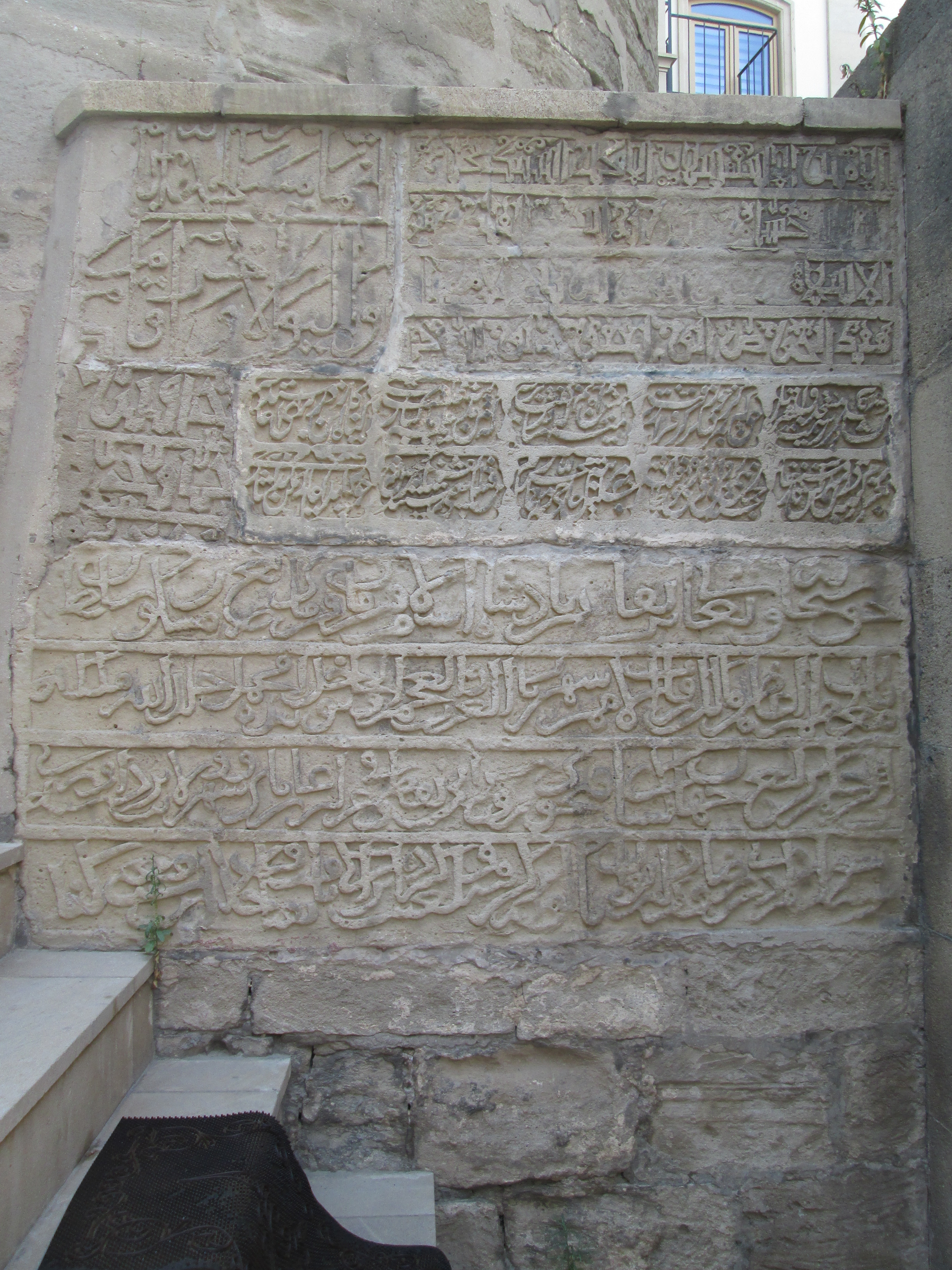
Stone inscriptions at the base of the minaret of the Juma Mosque (Icherisheher)

The inscription in the Juma Mosque of Icherisheher dates to the early 14th century. The inscription records the decree (yarligh) of the Ilkhanid ruler Muhammad Oljaitu (AH 1304–1316) concerning the exemption of the lower classes of Baku and Shirvan from a number of heavy taxes. As a result of both Ghazan Khan's reforms, as well as Olcaytu's decision to abolish certain taxes and other measures, the economic situation of the Shirvanshah state improved. The main purpose of Oljaitu's yarligh was to improve the condition of Baku city and its region, which were important in terms of economy and trade. The text of the yarligh also mentions the existence of a divan in Baku. In the 13th–14th centuries, the Council of Viziers (Divan al-Wuzara) existed in Baku.

The "qopchur" mentioned in the inscription, a Mongol term, was a tax collected at a rate of 1% from both settled and nomadic livestock owners. Due to improper collection, it caused suffering among the people. The "serane" tax was a poll tax collected from the lower classes (settled population), regardless of the payer's religion; it was introduced after the Mongol invasion. The oil tax was likely levied on entrepreneurs who owned oil wells. The "urfi" can be understood as taxes not prescribed by Sharia law.

== See also ==
- Turco-Mongol tradition
- Alexander III visit to Baku

== Literature ==
- Sara Ashurbeyli. The State of the Shirvanshahs. Baku, "Avrasiya Press", 2006, 416 p.
- Sara Ashurbeyli. History of the city of Baku. Baku, "Apostrophe", 2009, 380 p.
