= Qoşaqovaq =

- Municipality
- Location within Azerbaijan
- Coordinates: 40°43′07″N 47°26′19″E
- Country: Azerbaijan
- Rayon: Agdash

Population
  - Total: 1,083
- Time zone: UTC+4 (AZT)
  - Summer (DST): UTC+5 (AZT)

Qoşaqovaq (also, Koshakovag and Kosha-Kovakh) is a village and municipality in the Agdash Rayon of Azerbaijan. It has a population of 1,083.
