= Qulbəndə =

- Municipality
- Location within Azerbaijan
- Coordinates: 40°38′06″N 47°32′31″E
- Country: Azerbaijan
- Rayon: Agdash

Population
  - Total: 1,315
- Time zone: UTC+4 (AZT)
  - Summer (DST): UTC+5 (AZT)

Qulbəndə (also, Gülbəndə and Gyul’benda) is a village and municipality in the Agdash Rayon of Azerbaijan. It has a population of 1,315. The municipality consists of the villages of Qulbəndə, Orta Qəsil, Bəylik, and Aşağı Qəsil.
