= Kakhay =

Kakhay Kaxay
- Location within Azerbaijan
- Coordinates: 40°20′N 47°26′E
- Country: Azerbaijan
- Rayon: Agdash
- Time zone: UTC+4 (AZT)
  - Summer (DST): UTC+5 (AZT)

Kakhay is a village in the Agdash Rayon of Azerbaijan. It is situated in the central part of the country, within the Central Aran Economic Region.

== Geography ==
Kakhay is located in the lowlands of the Agdash District. The region is characterized by a mild and dry subtropical climate. The village is positioned near the Turyanchay River, which is a significant water source for the local agricultural community. The surrounding landscape consists primarily of plains, with the Bozdag mountain chain located to the north of the district.

== Demographics ==
While the exact population of the village of Kakhay fluctuates, the Agdash District as a whole has a population of approximately 111,100 (as of 2020). The residents are predominantly ethnic Azerbaijanis
