= Cardam =

- Municipality
- Location within Azerbaijan
- Coordinates: 40°34′16″N 47°30′35″E
- Country: Azerbaijan
- Rayon: Agdash

Population
  - Total: 1,340
- Time zone: UTC+4 (AZT)
  - Summer (DST): UTC+5 (AZT)

Cardam (also known as Dzhardam) is a village and municipality in the Agdash Rayon of Azerbaijan. It has a population of 1,340.
