= Pirəyir =

- Municipality
- Location within Azerbaijan
- Coordinates: 40°36′51″N 47°27′35″E
- Country: Azerbaijan
- Rayon: Agdash

Population
  - Total: 516
- Time zone: UTC+4 (AZT)
  - Summer (DST): UTC+5 (AZT)

Pirəyir (also, Piragir) is a village and municipality in the Agdash Rayon of Azerbaijan. It has a population of 516.
