= Kotanarx =

- Municipality
- Location within Azerbaijan
- Coordinates: 40°35′42″N 47°29′46″E
- Country: Azerbaijan
- Rayon: Agdash

Population
  - Total: 1,050
- Time zone: UTC+4 (AZT)
  - Summer (DST): UTC+5 (AZT)

Kotanarx (also, Ketanarkh and Kotanarkh) is a village and municipality in the Agdash Rayon of Azerbaijan. It has a population of 1,050.
