= Yukhary-Uchkovakh =

- Village
- Location within Azerbaijan
- Coordinates: 40°38′50″N 47°23′12″E
- Country: Azerbaijan
- Rayon: Agdash
- Time zone: UTC+4 (AZT)
  - Summer (DST): UTC+5 (AZT)

Yukhary-Uchkovakh is a village in the Agdash Rayon of Azerbaijan.
