= Dəhnəxəlil =

- Municipality
- Location within Azerbaijan
- Coordinates: 40°40′45″N 47°28′26″E
- Country: Azerbaijan
- Rayon: Agdash

Population
  - Total: 1,518
- Time zone: UTC+4 (AZT)
  - Summer (DST): UTC+5 (AZT)

Dəhnəxəlil (also, Dakhnakhalil and Dekhne-Khalil) is a village and municipality in the Agdash Rayon of Azerbaijan. It has a population of 1,518. The municipality consists of the villages of Dəhnəxəlil and Turyançay.
