= Tatlar =

Tatlar may refer to:

- Tat people (Caucasus)
- Tat people (Iran)
- Tats, a sub-ethnic group of the Crimean Tatars; see Crimean Tatars#Sub-ethnic groups
- Tatlar, Agdash, Azerbaijan
- Tatlar, Kalbajar, Azerbaijan
