= Aşağı Zeynəddin =

- Municipality
- Location within Azerbaijan
- Coordinates: 40°39′N 47°26′E
- Country: Azerbaijan
- Rayon: Agdash

Population
  - Total: 1,181
- Time zone: UTC+4 (AZT)
  - Summer (DST): UTC+5 (AZT)

Aşağı Zeynəddin (also, Ashagy Zeynaddin) is a village and municipality in the Agdash Rayon of Azerbaijan. It has a population of 1,181. The municipality consists of the villages of Aşağı Zeynəddin, Yeniarx, and Tatlar.
