= List of earthquakes in Azerbaijan =

This list of earthquakes in Azerbaijan, is a list of notable earthquakes that have affected areas within the current boundaries of Azerbaijan.

| Date | Time‡ | Place | Lat | Lon | Fatalities | Mag. | Comments | Sources |
|---|---|---|---|---|---|---|---|---|
| 427 | | Ganja | 40.5 | 46.5 | | 6.7 | Little information available about this event, except that the damage was severe. | |
| 906 | | Qivraq | 39.78 | 44.88 | | 6.2 | | |
| 30 September 1139 | night | Ganja see 1139 Ganja earthquake | 40.40 | 46.23 | 200,000–300,000 | 7.7 | One of the deadliest earthquakes in history. It completely destroyed the city of Ganja. Landslides were triggered on the mountains. | |
| 25 November 1667 | | Şamaxı see 1667 Shamakhi earthquake | 40.60 | 48.60 | 80,000 | 6.9 | Earthquakes lasted for three months, buildings of all types were ruined, damage to roads was so severe that caravans had to be re-routed. | |
| 4 January 1669 | | Şamaxı | 40.60 | 48.60 | 7,000 | 5.7 | | |
| 9 August 1828 | 16:00 | Şamaxı | 40.70 | 48.40 | | 5.7 | | |
| 2 January 1842 | 22:00 | Baku, Mashtagi | 40.5 | 50.0 | | 4.3–5.0 | Maximum perceived intensity of VIII (Severe) on the Mercalli intensity scale, but no details of damage or information about casualties. | |
| 11 June 1859 | 13:00 | Şamaxı see 1859 Shamakhi earthquake | 40.70 | 48.50 | 100 | 5.9 | | |
| 13 February 1902 | 09:39:30 | Şamaxı see 1902 Shamakhi earthquake | 40.70 | 48.60 | 2,000 | 6.9 | | |
| 27 April 1931 | 16:50:45 | Zangezur see 1931 Zangezur earthquake | 39.29 | 45.95 | 390–2,890 | 6.4 | | |
| 4 June 1999 | 09:12:50 | Agdash, Ucar, Ağalı | 40.80 | 47.45 | 1 | 5.4 | | |
| 25 November 2000 | 18:09:11.4 | Baku see 2000 Baku earthquake | 40.25 | 49.95 | 26 | 6.8 | | |
| 7 May 2012 | 09:40 | Zaqatala Rayon | 41.54 | 46.77 | 15 injured | 5.6 | Earthquake seriously damaged 20 residential buildings, partly collapsed sports hall of a school and injured 15 people. Also felt in nearby Russia and Georgia. | |
| 5 June 2018 | 18:40:30 | Zaqatala Rayon | 41.53 | 46.79 | 1 dead, 31 injured | 5.4 | Homes were damaged and social facilities disrupted. One person died of a heart attack and 31 others were injured. | |
Note: The inclusion criteria for adding events are based on WikiProject Earthquakes' notability guideline that was developed for stand alone articles. The principles described also apply to lists. In summary, only damaging, injurious, or deadly events should be recorded.

== See also ==
- Geology of Azerbaijan
