= Xınaxlı =

- Municipality
- Location within Azerbaijan
- Coordinates: 40°21′N 47°28′E
- Country: Azerbaijan
- Rayon: Agdash

Population
  - Total: 480
- Time zone: UTC+4 (AZT)
  - Summer (DST): UTC+5 (AZT)

Xınaxlı (also, Khynakhly) is a village and municipality in the Agdash Rayon of Azerbaijan. It has a population of 480.
