= 1902 Andijan earthquake =

- Location within Uzbekistan
- UTC time: 1902-12-16 05:07
- ISC event: n/a
- USGS-ANSS: n/a
- Local date: December 16, 1902
- Local time: 11:07
- Magnitude: 6.4 M_{s}
- Depth: 9 km (5.6 mi)
- Epicenter: 40.8°N 72.3°E
- Areas affected: Andijan Province, Uzbekistan
- Max. intensity: MMI IX (Violent)
- Casualties: 700–4,880

The 1902 Andijan earthquake occurred on December 16 with a surface-wave magnitude of 6.4 and a maximum perceived Mercalli intensity of IX (Violent). The city was leveled and over 4,000 people died. More than 40,000 homes were destroyed in the Andijan Region of Uzbekistan. This was the worst earthquake to occur in Uzbekistan in the 20th century.

== See also ==
- List of earthquakes in 1902
