= List of earthquakes in 1902 =

Earthquakes in 1902
Approximate epicenters of the earthquakes in 1902
- 4.0–5.9 magnitude
- 6.0–6.9 magnitude
- 7.0–7.9 magnitude
- 8.0+ magnitude
- Strongest: Russian Empire, Sea of Okhotsk, Russia (Magnitude 8.0) June 11
- Deadliest: Qing Dynasty, Xinjiang, China (Magnitude 7.7) August 22 10,000 dead
- Total fatalities: 19,006

Number by magnitude
- 9.0+: 0

This is a list of earthquakes in 1902. Only magnitude 6.0 or greater earthquakes appear on the list. Exceptions to this are earthquakes which have caused death, injury or damage. Events which occurred in remote areas will be excluded from the list as they wouldn't have generated significant media interest. All dates are listed according to UTC time. The countries and their flags are noted as they would have appeared in this year for example the Netherlands being present-day Indonesia. The number of large (Magnitude 7.0+) events remained similar to the last couple of years. There were a number of events which caused high casualties. The deadliest quake struck Emirate of Bukhara in December. China and Guatemala also experienced high death tolls during the year.

== Overall ==
=== By death toll ===
Rank	Death toll	Magnitude	Location	MMI	Depth (km)	Date
1	10,000	7.7	Qing Dynasty, Xinjiang Province	X (Extreme)	18.0	August 22
2	4,880	6.4	Russian Empire, Andijan Province	IX (Violent)	9.0	December 16
3	2,000	7.5	Guatemala, Escuintla Department	VII (Very strong)	0.0	April 18
3	2,000	6.9	Russian Empire, Shamakhi District	IX (Violent)	15.0	February 13
4	101	7.3	Philippines, Mindanao	X (Extreme)	0.0	August 21

- Note: At least 10 casualties

=== By magnitude ===
Rank	Magnitude	Death toll	Location	MMI	Depth (km)	Date
1	8.0	0	Russian Empire, Sea of Okhotsk	IV (Light)	600.0	June 11
2	7.8	0	Mexico, Chiapas	VII (Very strong)	0.0	September 23
3	7.7	10,000	Qing Dynasty, Xinjiang Province, China	X (Extreme)	0.0	August 22
= 4	7.5	2,000	Guatemala, Escuintla Department	VII (Very strong)	0.0	April 18
= 4	7.5	0	German Empire, Northern Mariana Islands	IX (Violent)	0.0	September 22
5	7.3	101	Philippines, Mindanao	X (Extreme)	0.0	August 21
= 6	7.2	0	German Empire, New Britain, German New Guinea	( )	0.0	January 24
= 6	7.2	0	Afghanistan, Badakhshan Province	( )	200.0	October 6
7	7.1	0	Mexico, Baja California	( )	0.0	December 12
= 8	7.0	0	United States, Fox Islands (Alaska)	( )	0.0	January 1
= 8	7.0	0	Netherlands, Celebes Sea, Dutch East Indies	( )	0.0	January 12
= 8	7.0	2	Mexico, Guerrero	( )	0.0	January 16
= 8	7.0	0	Japan, off the east coast of Honshu	( )	35.0	May 2

- Note: At least 7.0 magnitude

== Notable events ==
=== January ===
January
- Strongest: 7.2 M_{w} German Empire
- Deadliest: 7.0 M_{w} Mexico; 2 deaths
- Total fatalities: 2

Number by magnitude
- 8.0–8.9: 0
- 7.0–7.9: 4
- 6.0–6.9: 5

Date	Country and location	M_{w}	Depth (km)	MMI	Notes	Casualties	
Date	Country and location	M_{w}	Depth (km)	MMI	Notes	Dead	Injured
1	United States, Fox Islands (Alaska)	7.0	0.0		Depth unknown.		
12	Netherlands, Celebes Sea, Dutch East Indies	7.0	0.0		Depth unknown.		
16	Mexico, Guerrero	7.0	0.0		Depth unknown. 2 people were killed and another 2 were injured. Damage was caused in the area.	2	2
17	Japan, south of Hokkaido	6.5	35.0				
18	Guatemala, Quetzaltenango Department	6.3	0.0		Depth unknown. Some homes were damaged or destroyed.		
24	German Empire, south of New Britain, German New Guinea	7.2	0.0		Depth unknown.		
30	Japan, Aomori Prefecture, Honshu	6.9	35.0				
30	Japan, off the east coast of Honshu	6.9	0.0		Depth unknown. Doublet earthquake.		
31	Japan, south of Hokkaido	6.6	35.0				

=== February ===
February
- Strongest: 6.9 M_{w} 4 events
- Deadliest: 6.9 M_{w} Russian Empire, Azerbaijan; 2,000 deaths
- Total fatalities: 2,000

Number by magnitude
- 8.0–8.9: 0
- 7.0–7.9: 0
- 6.0–6.9: 5

Date	Country and location	M_{w}	Depth (km)	MMI	Notes	Casualties	
Date	Country and location	M_{w}	Depth (km)	MMI	Notes	Dead	Injured
9	Tonga	6.9	0.0		Depth unknown.		
9	New Zealand, Chatham Islands	6.9	0.0		Depth unknown.		
13	Russian Empire, Shamakhi District, Azerbaijan	6.9	15.0	IX	The 1902 Shamakhi earthquake killed at least 86 people and injure 60. Extensive damage was caused. 3,496 homes were destroyed and 3,943 were damage.	86	60
17	Dominican Republic, north of	6.9	0.0		Depth unknown.		
20	Japan, south of Hokkaido	6.7	35.0				

=== March ===
March
- Strongest: 6.9 M_{w} Netherlands
- Total fatalities: 0

Number by magnitude
- 8.0–8.9: 0
- 7.0–7.9: 0
- 6.0–6.9: 3

Date	Country and location	M_{w}	Depth (km)	MMI	Notes	Casualties	
Date	Country and location	M_{w}	Depth (km)	MMI	Notes	Dead	Injured
5	Chile, Tarapaca Region	6.8	0.0		Depth unknown.		
22	United States, central California	6.8	0.0		Depth unknown.		
28	Netherlands, off the north coast of Papua (province), Dutch East Indies	6.9	0.0		Depth unknown.		

=== April ===
April
- Strongest: 7.5 M_{w} Guatemala
- Deadliest: 7.5 M_{w} Guatemala; 2,000 deaths
- Total fatalities: 2,000

Number by magnitude
- 8.0–8.9: 0
- 7.0–7.9: 1
- 6.0–6.9: 1

Date	Country and location	M_{w}	Depth (km)	MMI	Notes	Casualties	
Date	Country and location	M_{w}	Depth (km)	MMI	Notes	Dead	Injured
11	Russian Empire, southern Lake Baykal	6.6	16.0				
19	Guatemala, Escuintla Department	7.5	0.0	VII	The 1902 Guatemala earthquake resulted in 2,000 deaths and major damage. Depth unknown.	2,000	

=== May ===
May
- Strongest: 7.0 M_{w} Japan
- Total fatalities: 0

Number by magnitude
- 8.0–8.9: 0
- 7.0–7.9: 1
- 6.0–6.9: 2

Date	Country and location	M_{w}	Depth (km)	MMI	Notes	Casualties	
Date	Country and location	M_{w}	Depth (km)	MMI	Notes	Dead	Injured
2	Japan, off the east coast of Honshu	7.0	35.0				
8	Japan, southeast of Kyushu	6.6	35.0				
28	Japan, Hokkaido	6.5	35.0				

=== June ===
June
- Strongest: 8.0 M_{w} Russian Empire
- Total fatalities: 0

Number by magnitude
- 8.0–8.9: 1
- 7.0–7.9: 0
- 6.0–6.9: 0

Date	Country and location	M_{w}	Depth (km)	MMI	Notes	Casualties	
Date	Country and location	M_{w}	Depth (km)	MMI	Notes	Dead	Injured
11	Russian Empire, Sea of Okhotsk	8.0	600.0	IV			

=== July ===
July
- Strongest: 6.8 M_{w} Tonga
- Total fatalities: 0

Number by magnitude
- 8.0–8.9: 0
- 7.0–7.9: 0
- 6.0–6.9: 3

Date	Country and location	M_{w}	Depth (km)	MMI	Notes	Casualties	
Date	Country and location	M_{w}	Depth (km)	MMI	Notes	Dead	Injured
3	Qing Dynasty, Jilin Province, China	6.7	20.0				
5	Ottoman Empire, Central Macedonia	6.6	0.0	IX	Depth unknown.		
6	Tonga	6.8	0.0				

=== August ===
August
- Strongest: 7.7 M_{w} Qing Dynasty, China
- Deadliest: 7.7 M_{w} Qing Dynasty, China; 10,000 deaths
- Total fatalities: 10,101

Number by magnitude
- 8.0–8.9: 0
- 7.0–7.9: 2
- 6.0–6.9: 1
- 5.0–5.9: 1

Date	Country and location	M_{w}	Depth (km)	MMI	Notes	Casualties	
Date	Country and location	M_{w}	Depth (km)	MMI	Notes	Dead	Injured
21	United States, Moro Gulf, Philippines	7.3	0.0	X	At least 101 people were killed and major damage was reported. Depth unknown.	101	
22	Qing Dynasty, Xinjiang Province, China	7.7	18.0	X	The 1902 Turkestan earthquake killed 5,650 people and caused major damage.	10,000	
30	Qing Dynasty, Xinjiang Province, China	6.8	0.0		Aftershock. Depth unknown.		
31	Qing Dynasty, Yunnan Province, China	5.5	0.0	VII	6 people were killed. Many homes were destroyed or damaged.	6	

=== September ===
September
- Strongest: 7.8 M_{w} Mexico
- Total fatalities: 0

Number by magnitude
- 8.0–8.9: 0
- 7.0–7.9: 2
- 6.0–6.9: 0

Date	Country and location	M_{w}	Depth (km)	MMI	Notes	Casualties	
Date	Country and location	M_{w}	Depth (km)	MMI	Notes	Dead	Injured
22	German Empire, Northern Mariana Islands	7.5	0.0	IX	At least 1 person was hurt and major damage was caused. Depth unknown.		1
23	Mexico, Chiapas	7.8	0.0	VII	Major damage was caused. Depth unknown.		

=== October ===
October
- Strongest: 7.2 M_{w} Afghanistan
- Total fatalities: 0

Number by magnitude
- 8.0–8.9: 0
- 7.0–7.9: 1
- 6.0–6.9: 0

Date	Country and location	M_{w}	Depth (km)	MMI	Notes	Casualties	
Date	Country and location	M_{w}	Depth (km)	MMI	Notes	Dead	Injured
6	Afghanistan, Badakhshan Province	7.2	200.0				

=== November ===
November
- Strongest: 6.9 M_{w} 2 events
- Total fatalities: 0

Number by magnitude
- 8.0–8.9: 0
- 7.0–7.9: 0
- 6.0–6.9: 3

Date	Country and location	M_{w}	Depth (km)	MMI	Notes	Casualties	
Date	Country and location	M_{w}	Depth (km)	MMI	Notes	Dead	Injured
4	Qing Dynasty, southern Qinghai Province, China	6.9	0.0		Depth unknown.		
20	France, Loyalty Islands, New Caledonia	6.9	0.0		Depth unknown.		
21	Japan, southeast of Taiwan	6.8	5.0				

=== December ===
December
- Strongest: 7.1 M_{w} Mexico
- Deadliest: 6.4 M_{w} Russian Empire, Emirate of Bukhara; 4,880 deaths
- Total fatalities: 4,880

Number by magnitude
- 8.0–8.9: 0
- 7.0–7.9: 1
- 6.0–6.9: 1

Date	Country and location	M_{w}	Depth (km)	MMI	Notes	Casualties	
Date	Country and location	M_{w}	Depth (km)	MMI	Notes	Dead	Injured
12	Mexico, Baja California	7.1	0.0		Depth unknown.		
16	Russian Empire, Andijan Province, Emirate of Bukhara	6.4	9.0	IX	4,880 people were killed in the 1902 Andijan earthquake. 41,704 homes were damaged or destroyed.	4,880	
