= Cüvə =

- Municipality
- Location within Azerbaijan
- Coordinates: 40°41′20″N 47°25′11″E
- Country: Azerbaijan
- Rayon: Agdash

Population
  - Total: 496
- Time zone: UTC+4 (AZT)
  - Summer (DST): UTC+5 (AZT)

Cüvə (also, Cuvə, Güvə, and Dzhuva) is a village and municipality in the Agdash Rayon of Azerbaijan. It has a population of 496.
