= Tatlar, Agdash =

Tatlar
- Location within Azerbaijan
- Coordinates: 40°39′12″N 47°26′31″E
- Country: Azerbaijan
- Rayon: Agdash
- Municipality: Aşağı Zeynəddin
- Time zone: UTC+4 (AZT)
  - Summer (DST): UTC+5 (AZT)

Tatlar is a village in the Agdash Rayon of Azerbaijan. The village forms part of the municipality of Aşağı Zeynəddin.
