= Yuxarı Zeynəddin =

- Municipality
- Location within Azerbaijan
- Coordinates: 40°39′55″N 47°31′52″E
- Country: Azerbaijan
- Rayon: Agdash
- Time zone: UTC+4 (AZT)
  - Summer (DST): UTC+5 (AZT)

Yuxarı Zeynəddin (also, Yukhary Zeynaddin) is a village and municipality in the Agdash Rayon of Azerbaijan. The municipality consists of the villages of Yuxarı Zeynəddin and Ağalı.
