= Eymur =

- Municipality
- Location within Azerbaijan
- Coordinates: 40°32′53″N 47°14′46″E
- Country: Azerbaijan
- Rayon: Agdash

Population
  - Total: 953
- Time zone: UTC+4 (AZT)
  - Summer (DST): UTC+5 (AZT)

Eymur is a village and municipality in the Agdash Rayon of Azerbaijan. It has a population of 953. The municipality consists of the villages of Eymur and Ağcaqovaq.
