= Hacıağabəyli =

- Location within Azerbaijan
- Coordinates: 40°35′N 47°39′E
- Country: Azerbaijan
- Rayon: Goychay
- Time zone: UTC+4 (AZT)
  - Summer (DST): UTC+5 (AZT)

Hacıağabəyli (also, Hacağabəyli, Gadzhiagabeyli, and Gadzhyagabeyli) is a village in the Goychay Rayon of Azerbaijan. The village forms part of the municipality of Yeniarx.
