= Gayibov =

Gayibov is an Azerbaijani surname. Notable people with the surname include:

- Farid Gayibov (born 1979), Azerbaijani politician
- Farrukh Gayibov (1891–1916), Russian pilot of Azerbaijani ancestry
- Ismat Gayibov (born 1942), Azerbaijani politician

== See also ==
- Ismat Gayibov Stadium, stadium, named for Ismat
- Qayibov
