= Orta Qəsil =

- Location within Azerbaijan
- Coordinates: 40°38′N 47°31′E
- Country: Azerbaijan
- Rayon: Agdash
- Municipality: Qulbəndə
- Time zone: UTC+4 (AZT)
  - Summer (DST): UTC+5 (AZT)

Orta Qəsil (also, Orta Kasil’) is a village in the Agdash Rayon of Azerbaijan. The village forms part of the municipality of Qulbəndə.
