= 1902 Shamakhi earthquake =

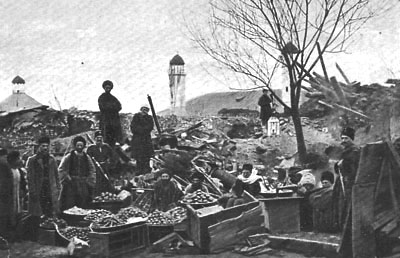

- Location within Azerbaijan
- UTC time: 1902-02-13 09:39:30
- ISC event: n/a
- USGS-ANSS: n/a
- Local date: 13 February 1902
- Magnitude: 7.4 M_{w}
- Depth: 15 km (9.3 mi)
- Epicenter: 40.7°N 48.6°E
- Areas affected: Shemakha uezd, Baku Governorate, Russian Empire (now Shamakhi District, Azerbaijan)
- Max. intensity: MMI IX (Violent)
- Casualties: 2,000 killed

The 1902 Shamakhi earthquake occurred on 13 February with a moment magnitude of 7.4 and maximum Modified Mercalli intensity of IX (Violent). Up to 2,000 people died and thousands more were injured in the Shemakha uezd within the Baku Governorate of the Russian Empire (present-day Republic of Azerbaijan). About 7,439 buildings were damaged or destroyed in the city and surrounding villages. Shamakhi had been devastated by earlier earthquakes in 1806, 1859 and 1872. The 1902 earthquakes remains one of the most destructive in Azerbaijan.

== Geology ==
Azerbaijan is situated in a region of subduction involving the Arabian and Eurasian plates which has been ongoing for 5 million years, forming as a result the Greater Caucasus Range. The Main Caucasus Thrust Fault, a north-dipping fault, accommodates most of the plate interaction. Subduction was later accommodated 1.5 million years ago by the Kura fold and thrust belt. The Kura fold and thrust belt spans 275 km (171 mi) from Tbilisi in Georgia to Shamakhi, consisting of a series of thrust faults.

== Earthquake ==
Isoseismal mapping of affected buildings indicate an epicenter location close to Shamakhi and the rupture was consistent with that occurring on the Kura Thrust Fault. Paleoseismic studies involving trenching in Agsu District revealed surface ruptures associated with two earthquakes. The older of the two may correspond to a large earthquake in 1668 while the younger could reflect the 1902 event which displayed 3.5 m (11 ft) of offset. By estimating a rupture area of 50 by 30 km^{2} (19 by 12 sq mi), consistent with the area of major damage, and considering the 3.5 m (11 ft) of average slip, the moment magnitude (M_{w}) is 7.4.

== Impact ==
The earthquake struck at noon, and Shamakhi was totally destroyed. In addition to the city in ruins, the earthquake also devastated 125 nearby settlements. The destruction of 4,000 homes left 20,000 people homeless. Eight historical mosques, 42 churches, more than 10 madrasas, as well as many commercial buildings and shops were destroyed. In the villages outside the city, over 3,000 houses, many mosques and farmhouses were razed. Damage was made worse by fires started from people cooking; it destroyed many structures that were still standing. The destruction of Shamakhi was attributed to wet soil conditions and building materials which consisted of stones and clay mortar. Damage was light in areas where Christians lived because most homes in these areas were constructed from wood.

== See also ==
- List of earthquakes in 1902
- List of earthquakes in Azerbaijan
