= Yuxarı Qəsil =

- Municipality
- Location within Azerbaijan
- Coordinates: 40°39′00″N 47°31′13″E
- Country: Azerbaijan
- Rayon: Agdash

Population
  - Total: 1,705
- Time zone: UTC+4 (AZT)
  - Summer (DST): UTC+5 (AZT)

Yuxarı Qəsil (also, Juxari Qəsil and Yukhary Kasil’) is a village and municipality in the Agdash Rayon of Azerbaijan. It has a population of 1,705.
