= Ağalı, Agdash =

Ağalı
- Location within Azerbaijan
- Coordinates: 40°39′52″N 47°27′14″E
- Country: Azerbaijan
- Rayon: Agdash
- Municipality: Yuxarı Zeynəddin
- Time zone: UTC+4 (AZT)
  - Summer (DST): UTC+5 (AZT)

Ağalı (also, Agaly) is a village in the Agdash Rayon of Azerbaijan. The village forms part of the municipality of Yuxarı Zeynəddin.
