= Mishlesh =

Mishlesh Мишлеш
- Selo
- Location within Republic of Dagestan Location within Russia
- Coordinates: 41°39′N 47°05′E
- Country: Russia
- Region: Republic of Dagestan
- District: Rutulsky District
- Time zone: UTC+3:00

Mishlesh (Russian: Мишлеш) is a rural locality (a selo) in Rutulsky District, Republic of Dagestan, Russia. Population: 1,055 (2021 census); 1,242 (2002 census); 1,025 (1989 Soviet census). There are 6 streets.

== Geography ==
Mishlesh is located on the right bank of the Samur River, 41 km northwest of Rutul (the district's administrative centre) by road. Muslakh and Tsakhur are the nearest rural localities.

== Nationalities ==
Tsakhur people live there.

== Famous residents ==
- Garun Ibragimov (Doctor of Philology, Professor of the Dagestan Pedagogical Institute)
- Achley Ramazan (leader of the Zakatala uprising in 1830)
