= 1888 visit by Alexander III to Baku =

1888 Russian imperial trip to Azerbaijan

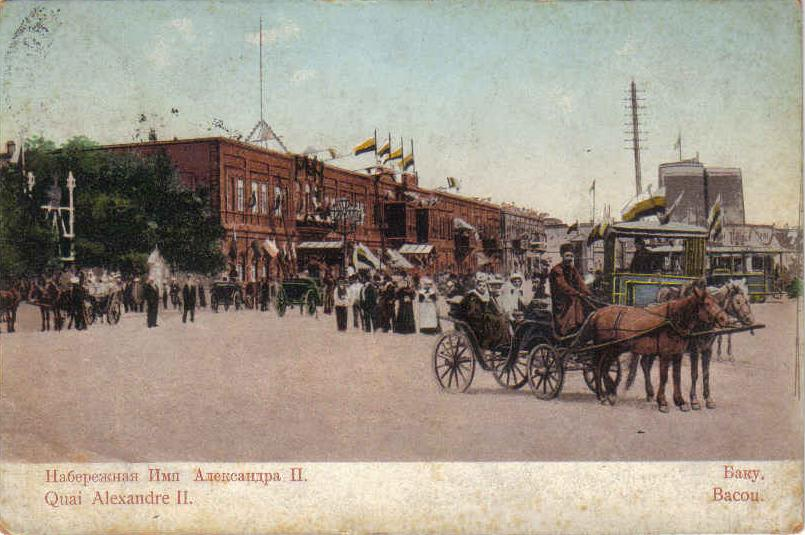
Embankment of Baku decorated with imperial flags and the Governor's House during the visit of Alexander III

Emperor Alexander III of Russia, Empress Maria Feodorovna and their sons Nicholas and George visited Baku from 8 (20) to 9 (21) October 1888. This was the first and only visit of the Russian monarchs to Baku.

By the time Alexander and his family arrived in Baku, the city had already been the administrative center of the Baku province for 29 years and was considered, if not the first, then at least the second city in the Caucasus in terms of the number of inhabitants. So, in 1888, according to the investigations begun by the police, up to 80 thousand people lived in Baku, most of them were Azerbaijanis (“Aderbeyjan Tatars” in the terminology of that time). The income of Baku in 1886 reached 327 thousand rubles, and the main source of it was the fee for the unloading of goods at the quays of the city (up to 90 thousand rubles).

== 8 October 1888 ==
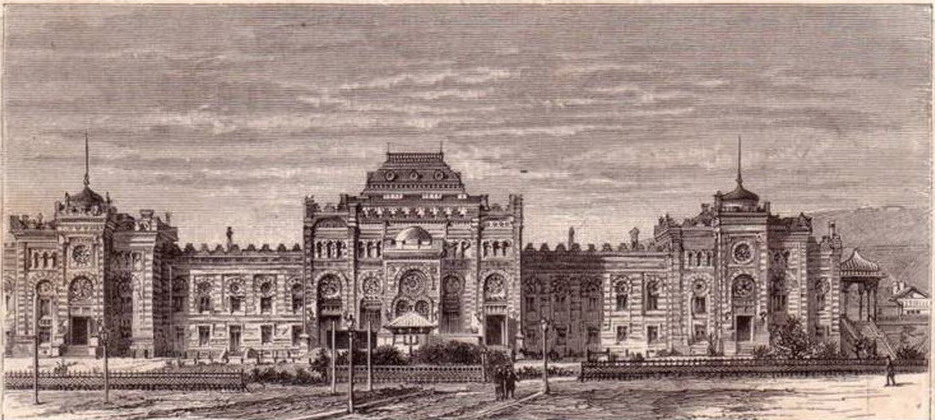
Baku railway station in the 19th century

The imperial train arrived in Baku on Saturday, 8 (20) October 1888 at 2 pm. A standard flew over the Governor's House, and a salute was heard from the battery and ships. The railway station was decorated with flags and plants. All the pillars were entwined with greenery, which was brought from Lankaran.

On the station's platform, the imperial family was greeted by the Baku Vice-Governor, the actual State Councilor, I.A. Benislavsky, the Chief Commander of the Ports and the Commander of the Baku Port, Rear Admiral V. Ya. Bal, the Chief of Police Lieutenant, I. A. Deminsky, the Mayor, S. I. Despot-Zenovich, and the Councilors of the Duma. The Emperor and his family went around the representatives of the city and received the bread and salt on a silver platter. The mayor Despot-Zenovich made a welcoming speech.

Later, the ladies of the Baku society introduced themselves to the Empress Maria Feodorovna, and the wife of the Governor of the Province presented the empress with a bouquet. Among the ladies were Muslim women in rich brocade national costumes. The Mayor presented the Empress with a bouquet in a golden port-bouquet, on which, on one side, “1888, Baku” was depicted in enamel, and on the other, Her Majesty's monogram made of diamonds. Masses of people in colorful costumes stood on the streets. The whole city was decorated with flags, even phaetons and carts were driven around decorated with flags.

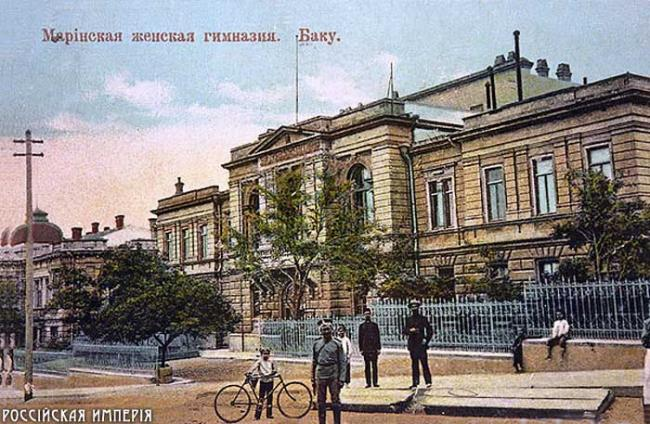
Mariinskaya Women's Gymnasium on a postcard of the Russian Empire

From the station, the imperial family went to the cathedral. There were masses of people and trellises of troops along this road. In the cathedral, the imperial family was greeted by the Exarch of Georgia, His Eminence Palladium, who welcomed the Emperor with a speech. From the cathedral, the imperial family went to the governor's house. Along this path, there were unarmed troops with choruses of music. Starting from the embankment, the troops were replaced by pupils of educational institutions, and those of women's educational institutions settled near the imperial house. A guard of honor stood in front of the entrance - the 1st company of the 81st Absheron Infantry Regiment. Arriving at the square to the Governor's House and leaving the carriage, the imperial family bypassed all deputations from all estates of the Baku province. Among them were the deputations of the Dagestan region, which were represented by the Major General Prince Chavchavadze, the Major General Gaidarov, representatives of the Transcaspian region headed by the Lieutenant General Komarov, the Head of the Merv District Alikhanov, as well as Nurberdy Khan's widow, Khansha Gul-Jamal-bay with two sons. After bypassing the delegations, the guard of the Absheron regiment passed by the Emperor in a ceremonial march.

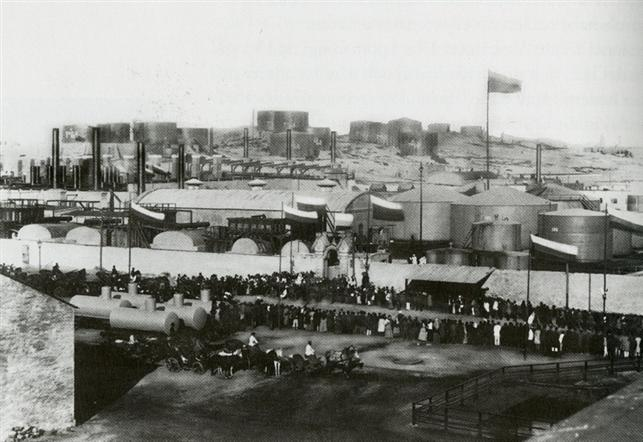
Tsar Alexander III and ministers visited the BroNobel oil facilities "Chernyi Gorod" in Baku.

At half past three, the imperial family visited the Mariinskaya Women's Gymnasium. (Note: Nowadays, the National Art Museum of Azerbaijan is located in the building of the gymnasium.) At the entrance, they were greeted by the Mayor and the administration of the gymnasium. As soon as the Emperor and the members of his family entered the vestibule, the choir of students of the gymnasium and students from the real school, (Note: Nowadays, the Azerbaijan State Economic University is located in the building of a real school.) with the accompaniment of the organ and the piano, sang Beethoven's hymn "Glorification of God." Then the imperial family went to the Assembly Hall, where they listened to two plays and the choir "Dawn" by Tchaikovsky. After that, the students presented the Empress with a white tablecloth with the coat of arms of the city of Baku embroidered in silk.

After that, the imperial family went to the women's gymnasium of St. Nina, where they were met by the Vice-Governor I. A. Benislavsky. The Empress was greeted with a speech by the student Yakubovskaya who graduated from the course that year. Along with the School of St. Nina's students, the pupils of the orphanage of the local charitable society also brought gifts to the imperial couple. Afterwards, the Emperor and his family proceeded to the courtyard of the institution, where the students of the city schools were gathered.

Tsar Alexander III and ministers visited the BroNobel oil facilities "Chernyi Gorod" in Baku. Engineer Edvin Bergroth was responsible for security, and despite all the threats against the imperial family, the Tsar was able to walk around the Nobels' factories without any visible police nearby.
