= Güljamal =

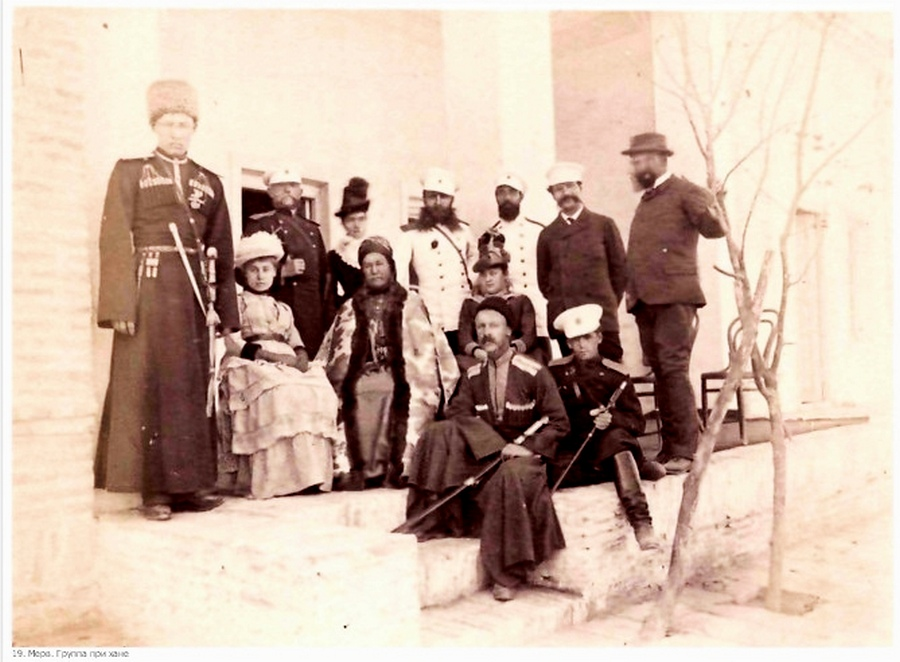
- Güljamal (center) in 1887
- Born: 1836
- Died: 1919 (aged 82–83)
- Spouse(s): Nurberdy

Güljamal Khanum (1836 – 1919) was a Teke tribal leader. She was the last independent Turkmen leader.

The identity of Güljamal's first husband is unknown. The widowed Güljamal became the third wife of Nurberdy Khan, a Teke leader of the tribes around Akhal and Merv. She became a trusted advisor to her husband, a leader of the resistance to Russia's military incursion. Upon his death in April 1880, she assumed tribal leadership. She was a source of intelligence to the British Secret Service concerning Russian troop movements and activities in Afghanistan.

In 1884, she organized a gengesh which brought an end to conflict with Russia and accepted Russian control of Turkmen tribal lands.

She had a son with Nurberdy, Yusuf Khan. She was stepmother to Nurberdy's two sons, one of whom was Makhtum Quli Khan Nur-Berdy-Khanov.
