= Aşağı Qobuüstü =

- Location within Azerbaijan
- Coordinates: 40°42′06″N 47°18′36″E
- Country: Azerbaijan
- Rayon: Agdash
- Municipality: Qobuüstü
- Time zone: UTC+4 (AZT)
  - Summer (DST): UTC+5 (AZT)

Aşağı Qobuüstü (known as Yeniarx until 2015) is a village in the Agdash Rayon of Azerbaijan. The village forms part of the municipality of Qobuüstü.
