= Yeniarx, Goychay =

Yeniarx
- Municipality
- Location within Azerbaijan
- Coordinates: 40°34′31″N 47°40′04″E
- Country: Azerbaijan
- Rayon: Goychay

Population
  - Total: 1,340
- Time zone: UTC+4 (AZT)
  - Summer (DST): UTC+5 (AZT)

Yeniarx (also, Yeniarkh) is a village and municipality in the Goychay Rayon of Azerbaijan. It has a population of 1,340. The municipality consists of the villages of Yeniarx and Hacıağabəyli.
