= Alexander Nevsky Cathedral, Baku =

Alexander Nevsky Cathedral
- Александро-Невский Собор; Aleksandr Nevski Başkilsəsi
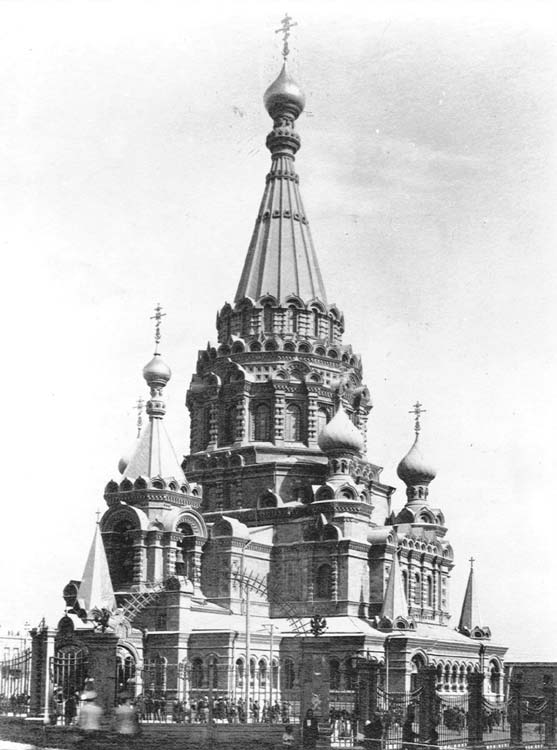
- Alexander Nevsky Cathedral in Baku, c. 1900
- Alexander Nevsky Cathedral
- 40°22′10.1454″N 49°49′56.2974″E
- Location: Baku, Baku Governorate
- Country: Azerbaijan
- Denomination: Russian Orthodox

History
- Dedication: Saint Alexander Nevsky
- Consecrated: 8 October 1898

Architecture
- Functional status: Demolished
- Architects: Robert Marfeld; Józef Gosławski
- Architectural type: Cathedral
- Completed: 1898
- Demolished: 1937

Specifications
- Length: 55 m (180 ft 5 in)
- Width: 44 m (144 ft 4 in)
- Height: 81 m (265 ft 9 in)

The Alexander Nevsky Cathedral (Russian: Александро-Невский Собор; Azerbaijani: Aleksandr Nevski Başkilsəsi, often referred to as Qızıllı kilsə – "The Golden Church") was the main Russian Orthodox cathedral in Baku, Azerbaijan from its completion in 1898 until its destruction in 1937 during the Soviet era under Joseph Stalin. The cathedral was the biggest Russian Orthodox structure ever built in the South Caucasus.

== History ==
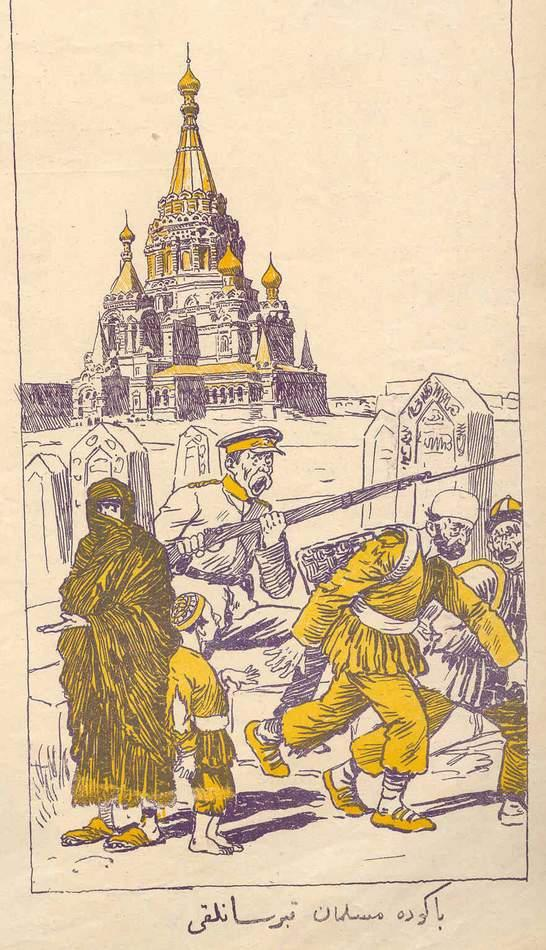
1908 cartoon published in the Azeri magazine Molla Nasraddin depicting Baku Muslims being forced to abandon their cemetery in favour of construction. The title in Azeri reads: "A Muslim cemetery in Baku."

In 1878, Valery Pozen, the governor of the Baku Governorate within the Russian Empire, expressed his concern to Baku mayor Stanislav Despot-Zenovich about the shortage of praying space for the city's growing Russian community.

The Most Holy Synod supported his idea of building a new cathedral and suggested that it should be erected on Persidskaya Street (present-day Mukhtarov Street), on a vast piece of land, which would become available after demolishing an old Muslim cemetery that had been abandoned in 1859.

This led to a 10-year debate between the Russian authorities and the Muslim community of Baku. All proposed alternatives were turned down by the authorities, and at the end Muslim leaders put aside their objections to the building of the cathedral on the cemetery site. On 10 July 1886, Emperor Alexander III officially approved the transfer of the land to the church. The first draft of the design, by the German-born architect Robert Marfeld, was approved on 30 July 1888.

On 8 October 1888, Alexander III and his family (including his elder son, future Emperor Nicholas II) visited Baku for the ceremony of laying the first stone. The ceremony was attended by Baku's Christian, Muslim and Jewish elite.

== Construction ==
The cathedral was one of a series built across Eastern Europe in honour of Saint Alexander Nevsky. It was designed by Marfeld and his apprentice, Polish-born architect Józef Gosławski. The Saint Basil's Cathedral and the Cathedral of Christ the Saviour were used as models for the exterior and the interior of the Alexander Nevsky Cathedral, respectively. However, the funding provided by the emperor was not enough to finish the construction. Donations worth 200,000 roubles collected from the residents of Baku made it possible for the construction to continue. It is noteworthy, that despite previous disagreements, about 75 percent of that money was donated by Muslims, including 10,000 roubles from Zeynalabdin Taghiyev. Another 1,000 roubles were provided by the Jewish community of Baku.

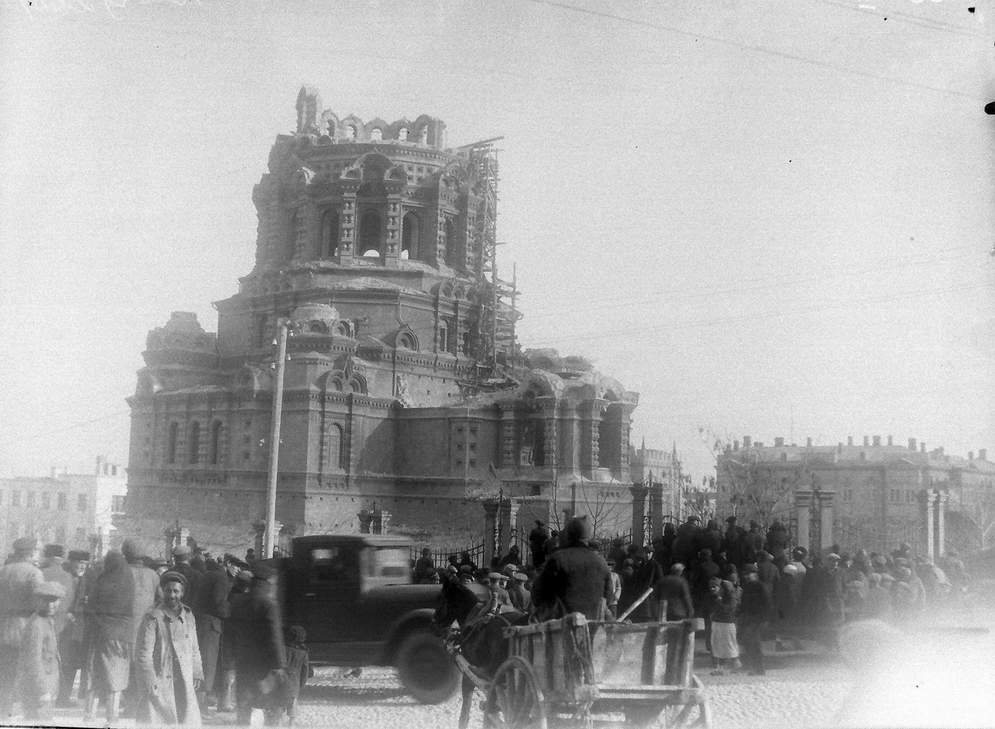
Demolition of the Alexander Nevsky Cathedral in Baku, 1937

The building of the cathedral was finally completed in 1898. Its domes, crosses and the main arch were made of pure gold. At 81 meters high, 55 meters long and 44 meters wide, it was the largest Russian Orthodox place of worship in the entire Caucasus at the time.

== Final years ==
The Alexander Nevsky Cathedral remained the primary centre of Eastern Orthodox life in Azerbaijan in the early Soviet era, much to the Soviet government's displeasure. In the 1930s, the cathedral was ordered to be blown up with dynamite along with the Armenian Apostolic Saint Thaddeus and Bartholomew Cathedral.

Located not far from City Hall, the site where the Nevsky Cathedral once stood is now occupied by the Bulbul School of Music.

== See also ==
- Holy Myrrhbearers Cathedral
- Church of Michael Archangel
