= Masum bey Qayibov =

Azerbaijani military officer (1864–1915)

- Azerbaijani: Məsum bəy Mirzə Məhəmmədqulu bəy oglu Qayıbov
- Born: Masum bey Mirza Mahammadqulu bey oghlu Qayibov; 1864; Shusha, Caucasus Viceroyalty (1801–1917), Imperial Russia
- Died: 1915 (aged 50–51); Tiflis, Caucasus Viceroyalty (1801–1917), Imperial Russia
- Military career
- Allegiance: Russian Empire (from 1881 to 1915)
- Service years: 1882 — 1915
- Rank: (Russian Empire) Major general of The Imperial Russian Army
- Conflicts: World War I
- Awards: 3rd Class Order of Saint Vladimir 2nd Class Ode of Saint Stanislaus 2nd Class Order of Saint Anne

Masum bey Qayibov or Nikolai Dmitrievich Qayibov (Azerbaijani: معصوم بگ میرزا محمدقلی بگ اوغلی غائبوف, Məsum bəy Mirzə Məmmədqulu bəy oğlu Qayıbov; b. April 19, 1864, Shusha, Russian Empire - October 20, 1915, Tiflis, Russian Empire) was an Azerbaijani military officer, major general and member of aristocratic Qayibov family.

== Life ==
He descended "from the nobility of the city of Shusha". He received his general education at the Baku Real School. He entered the service as a private cadet on September 1, 1881 at the 2nd Konstantinovsky Military School. On August 12, 1883, he was released as a second lieutenant in the 14th Georgian Grenadier Regiment. August 12, 1887 he was promoted to lieutenant. From October 11, 1891 to April 28, 1893, Lieutenant Mirza Masum bey Qayibov was assigned an official to the headquarter of the Caucasian Military District. From April 28, 1893 to May 19, 1899, Qayibov served as a junior assistant to the head of the Gorsky branch of the district headquarters. On June 4, 1895, he was promoted to staff captain.

On May 19, 1899, he was appointed assistant to the senior adjutant of the district headquarter. December 6, 1899 he was promoted to captain. On December 4, 1903, he was appointed as a Chief Adjutant of District Headquarter. On February 26, 1904, he was promoted to lieutenant colonel with approval as a senior adjutant of the headquarters of the Caucasian Military District. On December 6, 1907, he was promoted to colonel.

On March 13, 1909, Colonel Qayibov was appointed junior assistant to the head of the Terek region and the chief ataman of the Terek Cossack army. On December 6, 1913, he was promoted to major general "for distinction in service." On August 15, 1915, retired due to illness.

He converted to Orthodoxy during his military service. He died in October 1915 in Tbilisi.

== Awards ==
Awards:

- - 2nd Class Ode of Saint Stanislaus (1906)
- - 2nd Class Order of Saint Anne (1911)
- - 3rd Class Order of Saint Vladimir (1914)

== Sources ==
- Çingizoğlu, Ənvər Çingizoğlu (2005). Məhəmmədxan ağanın törəmələri (Qayıbovlar). Baku: Soy.
