= Holy Myrrhbearers Cathedral =

Coordinates: 40.3897°N 49.8208°E

- Russian: Кафедральный собор свв. Жен-Мироносиц
- Azerbaijani: Müqəddəs Mürr-daşıyan Zənənlər kafedral kilsəsi
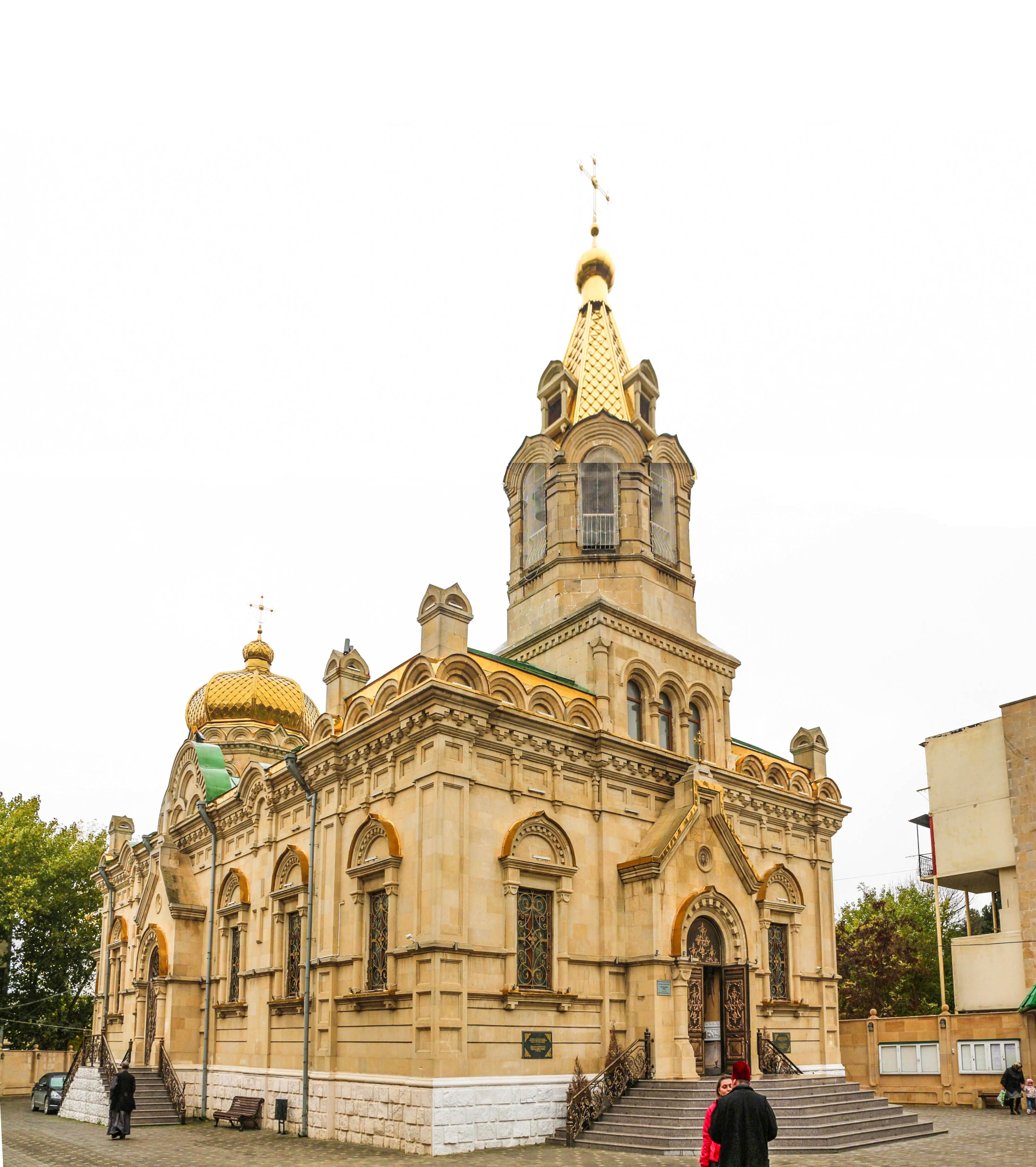

- Location within Baku, Azerbaijan
- Country: Azerbaijan
- Language: Russian
- Denomination: Russian Orthodox

History
- Former name: Regimental Church of the Archangel Michael of the 206th Salyan Infantry Regiment
- Status: Cathedral
- Dedication: Holy Myrrhbearers
- Consecrated: 16 December 1909

Architecture
- Architect: Fyodor Verzhbitsky
- Groundbreaking: 19 May 1908
- Completed: 22 December 1909

Administration
- Diocese: Diocese of Baku and Azerbaijan

Holy Myrrhbearers Cathedral (Russian: Кафедральный Собор Святых Жён-Мироносиц; Azerbaijani: Müqəddəs Mürdaşıyan Zənənlər Başkilsəsi) is a local historical monument and church, built in 1909 in Baku, Azerbaijan. It serves as the center of the Baku diocese.

The church was included in the list of immovable historical and cultural monuments of national importance by the decision No. 132 of the Cabinet of Ministers of the Republic of Azerbaijan on August 2, 2001.

Currently, four priests and three deacons serve in the church to meet the needs of Orthodox believers. The head priest of the church is Archpriest Dionisy Svechnikov.

The church is dedicated to the Holy Myrrhbearers, who are commemorated on the second Sunday after Pascha (Easter).

== History ==
=== Early years ===
The Cathedral of the Holy Myrrhbearers was built in Baku between 1908 and 1909, based on the design of Fyodor Verzhbitsky. The church follows the style of military temples, approved by the Construction Commission in Tsarist Russia in 1901. By 1917, a total of 64 churches in this style had been built in the territories covered by Tsarist Russia. The church built in Baku was under the authority of the 262nd Salyan Infantry Regiment and was constructed to meet their spiritual needs. Azerbaijani millionaire Haji Zeynalabdin Taghiyev also supported the construction of the church. Prominent political and religious figures of the time, including Ilarion Vorontsov-Dashkov, the viceroy of the Russian Tsar in the Caucasus, attended the opening of the church. The church's initial name was recorded as "Archangel Michael." From 1890 to 1914, the battalion and later the regiment priest was Ioann Vissarionovich Liadze.On April 10, 1910, the bodies of the former commander of the 262nd Salyan Infantry Regiment, Major General Mechislav Konstantinovich Valter, as well as lower-ranking soldiers of the regiment, were exhumed from their previous burial sites and ceremoniously reburied in the churchyard.

=== Soviet occupation ===
After the Soviet occupation in Azerbaijan, a campaign against religion began. Many mosques, churches, and synagogues were handed over to clubs for educational purposes. In addition, religious monuments were looted. During this period, the Cathedral of the Holy Myrrhbearers was also closed for worship, and the crosses on its roof were removed.A dispute occurred between the Bolsheviks and the priests when the looters entered the church. The priest, who tried to prevent the theft of golden icons and candlesticks, was shot. Later, the church building was converted into a Red Army house for soldiers.In 1970, the building was used as a map storage facility and later as a gymnasium.

During the Black January events on January 20, 1990, two shells hit the church roof. As a result, the roof was destroyed, the floor collapsed, and the walls cracked.

=== After independence ===
After Azerbaijan restored its independence, the church was transferred to the Russian Orthodox Church in 1991.

During the visit of Patriarch Alexy II of Moscow and All Russia to Azerbaijan on May 27, 2001, he consecrated this temple and granted it the status of a cathedral. Since there was another church in Baku named after Archangel Michael, the name of the church was changed to the Cathedral of the Holy Myrrhbearers.

The church was included in the list of immovable historical and cultural monuments of local significance by the decision No. 132 of the Cabinet of Ministers of the Republic of Azerbaijan on August 2, 2001.

In 2001, restoration work began on the church with the financial support of Aydın Qurbanov, vice-president of the All-Russian Azerbaijani Congress and philanthropist living in Moscow. A carved stone iconostasis was erected, wall paintings were made, and necessary church items were purchased. In 2002, architect Elchin Aliyev was awarded the "Saint Sergius of Radonezh" order by the Russian Orthodox Church for the church restoration project.

On March 24, 2003, after the restoration, the reopening of the church took place. The event was attended by the President of Azerbaijan, Heydar Aliyev, the Chairman of the Caucasus Muslims Board, Sheikh-ul-Islam Haji Allahshukur Pashazade, and the Deputy of Patriarch Alexy II of Moscow and All Russia. Aydın Qurbanov was awarded the first-degree Order of the Holy Prince "Daniil of Moscow" for his support in the church's restoration.

In April 2003, Patriarch Bartholomew I of Constantinople visited the Cathedral of the Holy Myrrhbearers and, as a blessing to Azerbaijan's Orthodox Christians, gifted a relic of Apostle Bartholomew, his celestial patron.

In June 2005, the Catholicos-Patriarch of All Georgia, Ilia II, visited the cathedral. In September 2005, Patriarch Alexy II of the Russian Orthodox Church visited the cathedral again and consecrated the main altar.

On November 15, 2013, the opening of the Orthodox Religious and Cultural Center of the Baku and Azerbaijan Diocese, built with state support, took place on the church grounds. The President of Azerbaijan, Ilham Aliyev, also attended the ceremony.

On August 19, 2024, the President of Azerbaijan, Ilham Aliyev, and the President of the Russian Federation, Vladimir Putin, visited the Cathedral of the Holy Myrrhbearers and presented commemorative gifts to the church.

== See also ==
- Alexander Nevsky Cathedral, Baku
- Church of Michael Archangel, Baku
