= Church of Michael the Archangel, Baku =

Church in Baku, Azerbaijan

Coordinates: 40.4167°N 49.8833°E

- Church of Michael the Archangel
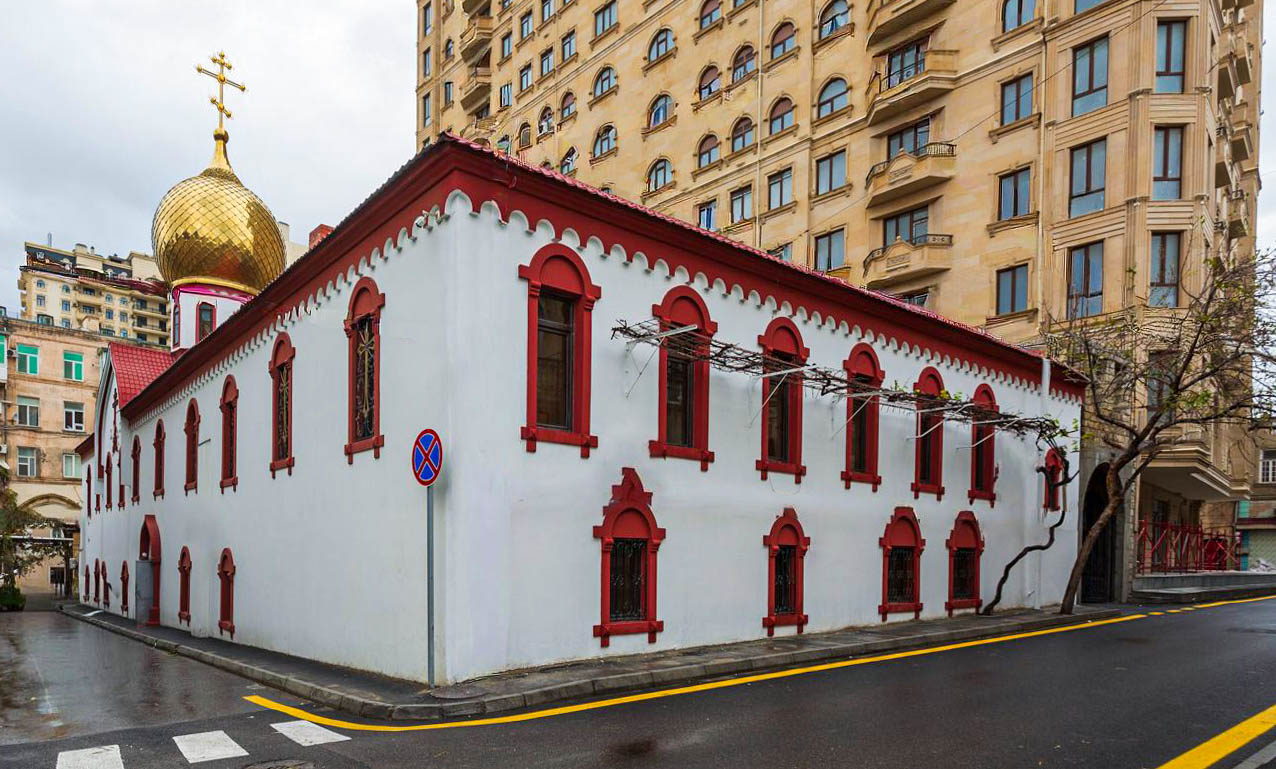
- View of the church
- Church of Michael the Archangel, Baku
- Location: Baku, Azerbaijan
- Country: Azerbaijan
- Denomination: Russian Orthodox
- Website: www.baku.eparhia.ru

History
- Former name: Flotskaya Church
- Founded: 1850
- Founder: Caspian Flotilla
- Dedication: St. Michael

Architecture
- Architectural type: Pskov architecture
- Completed: 1850

Clergy
- Bishop: Mefodi Efendiyev
- Priest(s): Andre, Georgi

Church of Michael the Archangel (Russian: Михайло-Архангельский храм; Azerbaijani: Mixayil Arxangel kilsəsi) or Flotskaya (Church of the Fleet) is a Russian Orthodox church located at the intersection of Vidadi and Zargarpalan streets in the Yasamal district, central Baku, Azerbaijan. It is under the jurisdiction of the Baku Eparchy and dedicated to Archangel Michael. The church's protoiereus is Mefodi Afendiyev, and it is served by three priests and one deacon. It is recognized as the oldest surviving church in Baku.

== History ==
=== Construction ===
After the integration of the Baku Khanate into the Russian Empire under the Treaty of Gulistan in 1813, a naval station was established on Sarı Island, located slightly north of Lankaran. The ships of this flotilla were responsible for border control and the inspection of cargo on vessels traveling between Iran, Baku, Astrakhan, and back. At that time, maritime activity in the Caspian Sea primarily involved coastal cabotage navigation. On Sarı Island, facilities such as barracks for the Caspian Flotilla personnel, headquarters, food storage warehouses, and a hospital were constructed. In 1822, at the initiative of officers and other naval officials stationed there, a church was built on Sarı Island. This church was dedicated to the "Holy Theotokos and Her Glorious Dormition."

In 1843, due to an increase in mortality rates caused by unfavorable climatic conditions on Sarı Island, the Caspian Flotilla stationed nearby was disbanded by decree of Russian Emperor Nicholas I. The flotilla was subsequently relocated to the Baku fortress. Until 1844, a small guard detachment remained on Sarı Island to oversee the facilities, including the now-deserted church, which had been left without clergy.

On July 29, 1844, the commander of the Astrakhan port and Caspian flotilla requested the chief chaplain of the army and navy, Protopriest Vasili Kutnevich, to issue an order for the relocation of the church on Sarı Island to Baku, using funds held in the church treasury. Following correspondence between the chief chaplain and various departments of the Naval Ministry, the relocation was approved. The church was moved to a two-story caravanserai building in Bayırshahar (Outer City), which was part of the Fleet Yard or Naval Yard, used as quarters for lower-ranking naval personnel. This building, designed in the Pskov architectural style, featured a worship hall reminiscent of a ship's deck.

Initially referred to as the Naval Church, it is noted in Protopriest Yunitski's writings that the church already existed by 1845, although the exact date of its construction and its builder remain unknown. In a report titled "Information on Churches and Priests under His Authority for 1847", submitted to the chief chaplain of the army and navy, Protopriest Vasili Kutnevich, it was mentioned that the church was constructed of stone. The chaplain of the 45th Naval Crew, theologian Vasili Kudryashev, was appointed as its first priest.By 1854, the church was located in the Baku Forstadt (suburbs), with a hospital nearby for use by all ranks of the Naval Department, according to Lieutenant Commander Nikolay Makarovich Filippov, a member of the Imperial Russian Geographical Society, who conducted hydrographic surveys near Baku.

According to the 39th issue of the "Kavkaz" newspaper from 1855, the church was constructed by members of the Caspian Sea Department, in honor of the chief of the Russian Volunteer Fleet and Regiment. Based on the 1854 master plan of Baku Fortress, the church was dedicated to the Dormition of the Virgin Mary.

By the late 19th century, Baku and its forstadt (suburbs) had very few multi-story buildings. As a result, the dome of the Naval Church stood prominently above other structures, making it a visible landmark. Additionally, its proximity to Bazarnaya Street (now Azerbaijan Avenue), which intersected the Shamakhi Road, made the church conveniently accessible for visiting officials.

=== 19th century ===
In 1850, during his visit to the South Caucasus region, the Russian heir, the future Emperor Alexander II, visited Baku, where he also visited the Naval Church. Additionally, in 1858, Isidore, the Exarch of Georgia and Metropolitan, visited Baku to consecrate the third church built in the city, the Nicholas Church, and also visited the Naval Church.

In 1868, the 21st Caucasian Line Battalion was renamed the 66th Baku Governorate Battalion and relocated from Lankaran to Baku, where it was stationed in Icheri Sheher (the Old City). Since 1833, when it was known as the 8th Georgian Line Battalion and stationed in the Lankaran Fortress, the battalion had had a chaplain. The battalion's church was dedicated to Archangel Michael, and its feast day, celebrated on November 8, was also considered the battalion's holiday. When the battalion was moved to Baku, church items, icons, birth registers, and other documents from the Lankaran church were brought to the city. The chaplain Pavel Puzanov served at the battalion, and the church was initially housed in the Holy Nicholas Church near Maiden Tower, but this space was inadequate for its needs. As a result, on August 15, 1873, by order of Emperor Alexander II, the church was transferred to the 66th Baku Governorate Battalion (later known as the Salyan Reserve Regiment) to meet the needs of the military unit. During this period, the church was referred to as the Battalion Church and later as the Regimental Church, although it continued to be called the Naval Church in the city. It was also known as the Old Naval Church.

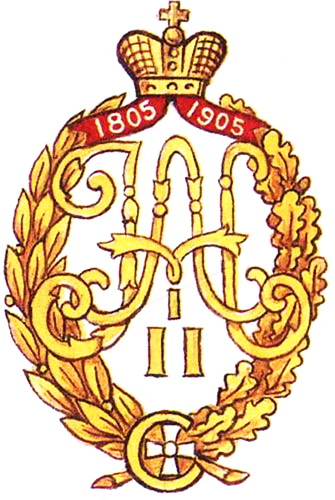
Badge of the 206th Salyan Infantry Regiment. 1911.

In the Forshtadt area, the ruined buildings, with the exception of the Naval Church, as well as the land beneath them, including the Naval Yard and an additional portion of it, were considered insignificant by the Maritime Administration and were put up for sale in 1874. These buildings were part of the Naval Yard, and after their sale, the church remained alone, surrounded only by residential houses. The sold properties later became part of the city's real estate, and the gendarmerie barracks were built there, separated from the church by a wall. In 1875, the administration of the church was transferred to the Caspian Diocese.

According to Christian priest Kozma Fyodorovich Spasski-Avtonomov in 1877, the Naval Church's dome was in disrepair, and the church required renovation. Until 1890, religious services at the church were overseen by the priests of the Baku military port, and during this period, the battalion church was affiliated with the St. Alexius Church of Moscow at the Baku port. From 1873 to 1890, there was no permanent priest at the battalion church. In 1890, after the battalion was renamed the 12th Caucasian Reserve Battalion, an additional priest was assigned to the church. This role was fulfilled by Ioann Vissarionovich Liadze, who served from July 15, 1890, until 1914. Between November 1891 and November 1892, renovations were carried out in the church with funds from the Holy Synod, amounting to 22,000 rubles. New Tsarist doors and a gurbangah (altar canopy) were installed, and other parts of the church were renovated. All the decorative work was done by the artist Ems.

On November 1, 1892, the newly restored church held a consecration ceremony in honor of Archangel Michael, led by Aleksandr Vasilyevich Yuniski, the protoiereus and head priest of St. Nicholas Church, along with the clergy assembly. The church housed many icons, but the most prominent ones were those of St. Metropolitan Alexius of Moscow and the Mother of God of the Living. These icons had been sent as gifts to the church from the Panteleimon Monastery located in Afonda, Salyan Regiment. The church only had one altar dedicated to St. Michael. On November 8, the feast day of Archangel Michael, the church celebrated its patronal feast day, and, as usual, a general battalion parade was held on that day.

According to priest Ioann Liadze in 1893, before the restoration, the church had a stone building. Its interior was 199 meters (653 feet) long and 85 meters (279 feet) wide. The bell of the church was placed on the flat roof of the building beside it, resting on wooden columns. Inside the church, there was a throne dedicated to Archangel Michael. The church spent 600 rubles annually to maintain its choir. The building next to the church, which belonged to the state, housed the priest's rooms, and the church's library contained up to 120 different books. After the restoration, the dome of the church was made of wood. Its interior dimensions became 206 meters (676 feet) long and 85 meters (279 feet) wide. The wooden iconostasis was replaced, and in 1892, the paintings inside were renewed. In the following years, the church's roof was covered with iron.

During these years, the visitors to the Naval Church included officers from the Salyan Reserve Regiment, as well as high-ranking individuals from the Baku gendarmerie, the local hospital, and the district military commander's office, as well as faithful citizens of the city. In 1894, under the leadership of the regent who had previously served at the Bayil Port Church, a new church choir was formed at the Naval Church. The choir was initially made up of students from the "Victors" progymnasium, child musicians from the training regiment, and officials from local institutions. On November 8, 1899, an icon dedicated to Archangel Michael was donated to the church. This icon was considered to be the patron of the Salyan Regiment.

=== 20th century ===
In 1905, on the occasion of the centenary of the Caspian Sea Battalion, Colonel Mamvriyski, the commander of the Salyan Regiment, requested the city mayor to approve renovations for the church. However, this request was denied. In 1907, another church dedicated to Archangel Michael was established as the church for the 206th Salyan Infantry Regiment. However, this church was closed in 1920. In the 1990s, it was restored and is now known as the Cathedral of the Myrrh-Bearing Women.

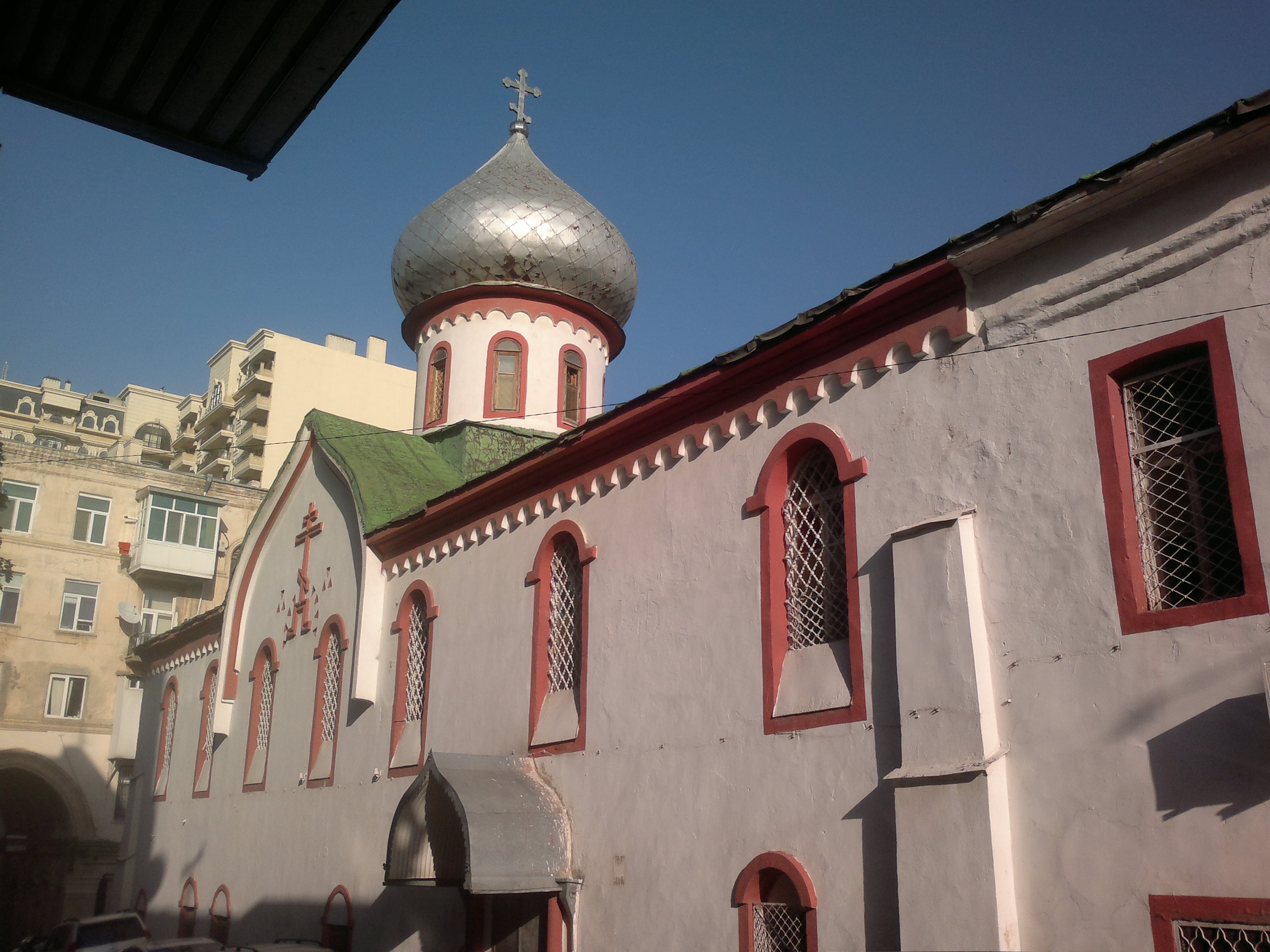
General view of the Church of St. Michael the Archangel. 2014.

During this period, construction began on a new military settlement for the Salyan Regiment.

In 1909, the construction of the new Salyan Barracks was completed, and in the same year, the construction of the new regimental church dedicated to Archangel Michael was finalized and consecrated. The previous Naval Church was integrated into this new church complex. Near the church, a residence for the priest was built at the state's expense. The Salyan Regiment's structure allocated a position for a single priest. Consequently, Ioann Liadze served at the new regimental church in the Salyan Barracks. After 1909, services at the former Naval Church were conducted by Aleksandr Levintsov, who initially worked as a law teacher in city schools (1911), and later by Priest Vasili Khidasheli (1913). From 1919 to 1920, P. Davidov served as the priest of the Archangel Michael Church. From 1918 to 1923, the chief priest of the church was Protoiyerey Sergey Gorodtsov, who later became the Metropolitan of Novosibirsk.

In 1936, the Archangel Michael Church was closed, and the building was repurposed as a dormitory. After the Second World War, recognizing the role of religion in the defeat of Nazi Germany, the Soviet authorities returned the building to the Russian Orthodox Church. In 1946, the church was reopened for worship, and it has remained operational ever since, without any interruptions.

In 1966, during the celebration of Christmas, a fire broke out in the Archangel Michael Church in Baku. At that time, the church's priest, Archpriest Ioann Kolodi, had to travel to Moscow for restoration efforts. While in Moscow, he met with Bishop Hermogen (Orekhov), a seminary classmate, and the then Archbishop of Tallinn and Estonia, Patriarch Alexy II. These meetings facilitated the donation of significant religious items to the church, including a three-tiered carved iconostasis by Palekh artists and icons of Saints Cyril and Methodius, as well as those of Prince Vladimir and Princess Olga. With the support of Heydar Aliyev, then-chairman of the Azerbaijani SSR's KGB, the church resumed its activities in 1967. On Aliyev's verbal instruction, essential construction materials were provided to repair the damaged church, contributed by members of the Central Committee affiliated with the parish. These efforts restored the church to its function as a vital spiritual center.

After Azerbaijan gained independence from the Soviet Union in 1991, the outbreak of the First Nagorno-Karabakh War led to a severe economic crisis in the country. This difficult situation made it impossible to properly maintain the Archangel Michael Church, implement heating systems, or carry out regular repairs. Consequently, the church's artwork began to deteriorate, while the roof, dome, and other structures fell into disrepair. In the early 1990s, attempts were made to restore the church, but the limited funding was only sufficient to cover the walls with a coat of paint. Unfortunately, this led to the complete destruction of the original wall paintings. This period marked a significant decline in the condition of the church's interior and exterior.

=== 21st century ===
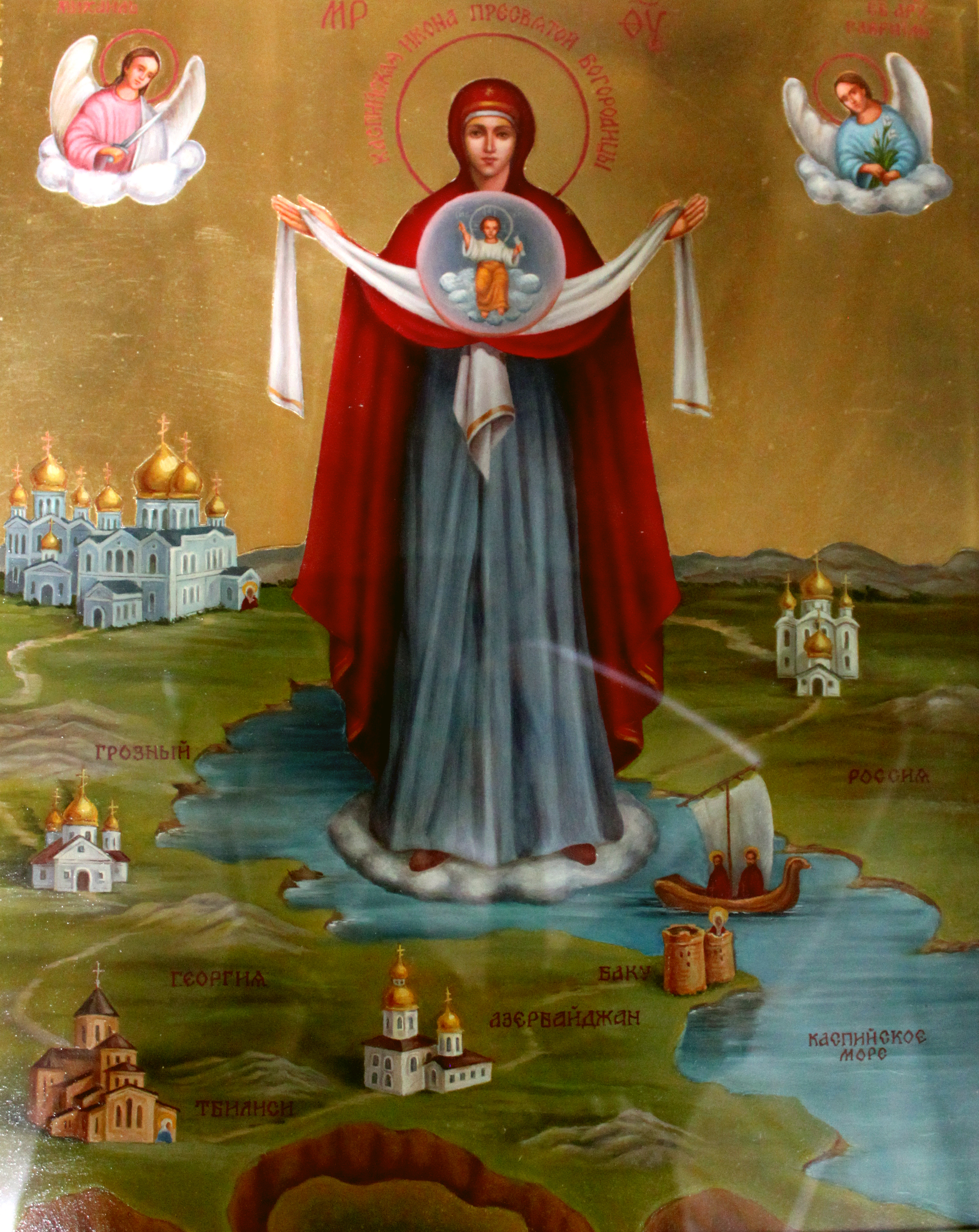
The icon "Holy Mary, Patroness of the Caucasus" located in the church.

On May 25, 2001, the Patriarch of Moscow and All Russia, Alexy II, visited the Archangel Michael Church in Baku and led a prayer service there. Earlier, in 2000, under the initiative of Archbishop Alexander Ishein of the Baku Diocese, construction began on a lower chapel dedicated to the Holy Apostle Bartholomew in the church's basement. This project was completed in 2006. The church complex now includes a lower chapel named after Apostle Bartholomew, alongside its primary worship area.

In 2013, construction of a four-story church building began. By 2015, with support from Yuri Dmitriyevich Yakovlev, Chairman of the Management Board of "VTB Bank-Azerbaijan" OJSC, the church's roof was completely replaced. In 2018, thanks to the support of the local community, a new dome was installed, topped with a golden cross. In 2019, improvements to underground communications on the church grounds were completed with the support of Lukoil-Azerbaijan JSC. Additionally, under a pro bono project led by architect Sabir Maharramov, new windows, decorative grilles, and a heating system were installed. The old church building's roof was replaced, the street-facing facades were restored, and new gates were installed. The project was funded through donations

In 2020–2021, under the directive of Azerbaijani President Ilham Aliyev, the Archangel Michael Church complex underwent a comprehensive reconstruction and restoration funded by the state and private benefactors. The project involved restoring the church's facade, installing a gilded dome, constructing a bell tower, and beautifying the interior. Historical frescoes on the church arches were renewed, and the altar, dome, walls, and narthex were fully painted. These works were carried out by professional iconographers from the Moscow State Academy of Arts and Design. The reconstruction was executed by the ArchiSO construction company. The church resumed its operations in April 2022.

The Archangel Michael Church has operated a charity dining hall to support the underprivileged. In 2020, around 15 individuals received hot meals on weekdays, while this number increased to 30–40 on weekends and holidays. Additionally, meals were delivered to bedridden patients in specialized containers. However, the onset of the COVID-19 pandemic and resulting quarantine measures in Azerbaijan caused temporary disruptions to the dining hall's operations due to food supply challenges. With support from VTB Bank-Azerbaijan and Yelo Bank, the church's social department initiated a charity program in March 2020, distributing food packages to families in need. Approximately 200 individuals benefited from this aid. Since 2018, the church has organized Christmas events for children from low-income families, funded by donations. In 2020, a celebration involving 54 children was hosted with the participation of Azerbaijani animator Tatyana Dolivets. The church also conducts events to honor World War II veterans.

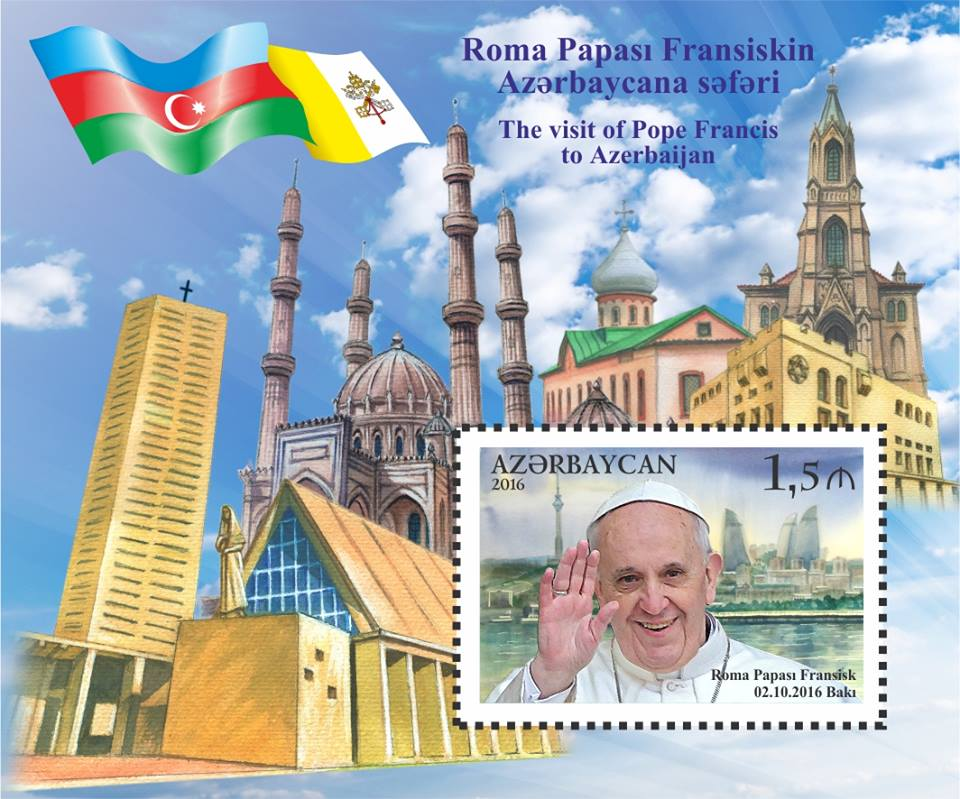
Pope Francis's pastoral visit to Azerbaijan on October 2, 2016, was commemorated with a postage stamp. Among the various churches of Baku depicted on the stamp, the Archangel Michael Church was also featured.

The social department of the Archangel Michael Church, under the leadership of the church rector, maintains connections with Azerbaijan's penitentiary institutions. According to the existing agreement, church members visit correctional facilities, where they meet with individuals serving sentences and hold services, including occasional baptisms. Additionally, qualified doctors are invited from among church members to provide medical consultations for the needy. Every Sunday, the church holds a free religious school for children, where subjects such as the Bible, choir, and iconography are taught after the service. The church also organized free courses for the Russian-speaking segment of Azerbaijani society, who faced difficulties in participating in social, political, and cultural activities due to language barriers. These courses focused on teaching the Azerbaijani language and were initially conducted with the participation of the Knowledge Fund under the President of the Republic of Azerbaijan. However, after the fund was dissolved, the courses were discontinued. In 2019, the church launched computer literacy courses for 10th and 11th-grade students, as well as literature courses for middle and high school students with the involvement of volunteers. Due to the quarantine regime in 2020, the courses were temporarily suspended.

On June 23, 2023, Metropolitan Kirill of Kazan and Tatarstan, along with Archbishop Feofilakt of Pyatigorsk and Cherkessk, who was temporarily managing the Baku Diocese, visited the Archangel Michael Church. On August 19, 2024, President Vladimir Putin of Russia and President Ilham Aliyev of Azerbaijan visited the Sacred Mirra-Carrier Women's Cathedral in Baku, as reported by RIA Novosti.

== Priests ==
The historical priests of the Archangel Michael Church include the following individuals:

- After 1845 — Vasili Kudryaşev
- 1868 — Aleksandr Preobrajenski
- 1868–1871 — Protoierey Dmitri Bordyujo
- 1869 — Pavel Puzanov
- 1869 — Ioann Kostyanski
- 1889 — Iyeriy Grechko
- Until 1890 — Nikolay Mirolyubov
- 1890–1914 — Ioann Vissarionovich Liadze
- 1909–1911 — Aleksandr Levintsov
- 1911–1913 — Vasili Khidasheli
- 1919–1920 — P. Davidov
- 1920–1923 — Sergey Gorodtsev

== See also ==
- Alexander Nevsky Cathedral, Baku
- Holy Myrrhbearers Cathedral
