= Agdash District =

District in central Azerbaijan

Coordinates: 40°38′N 47°28′E

- District
- Azerbaijani: Ağdaş rayonu
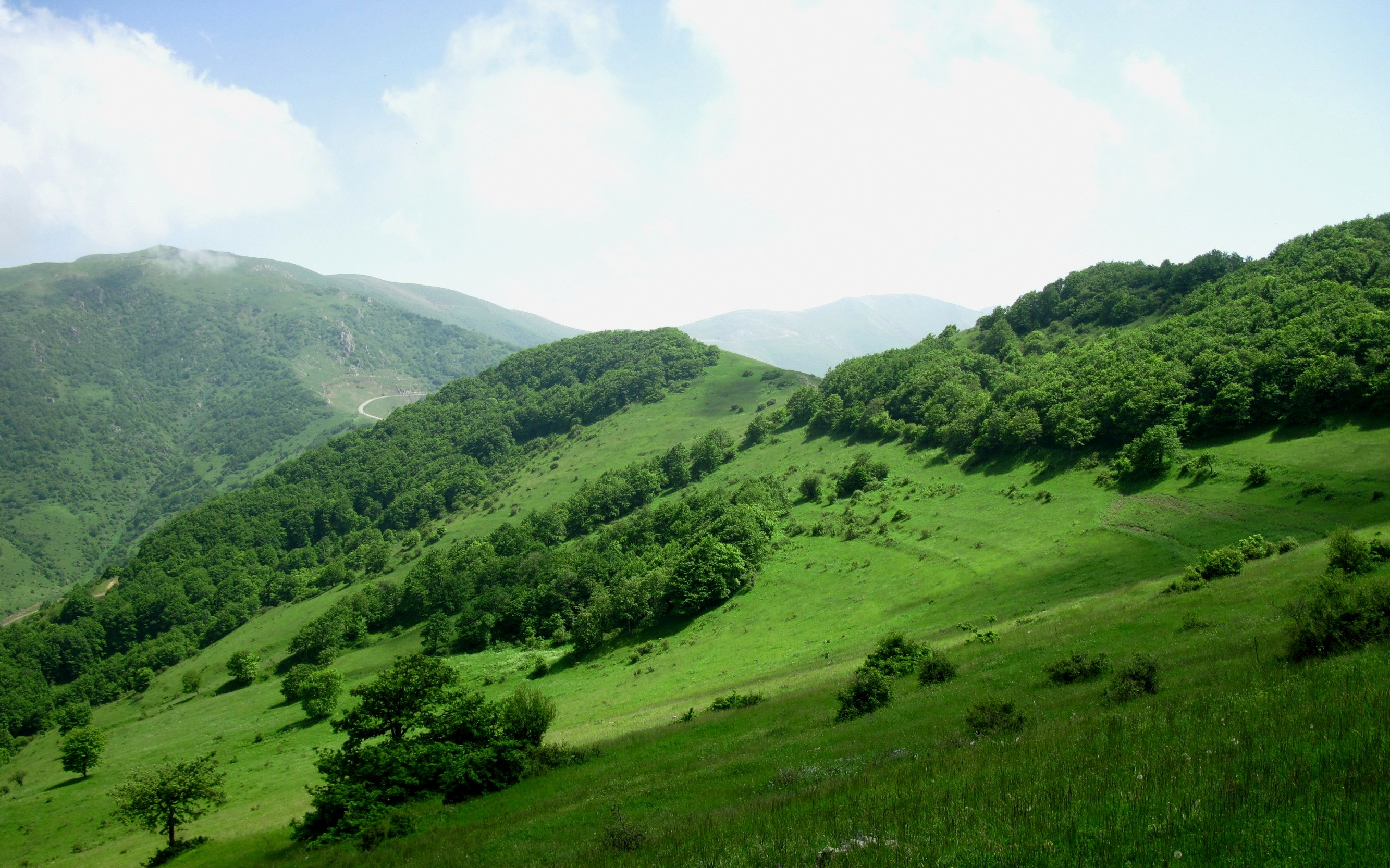

- Map of Azerbaijan showing Agdash District
- Country: Azerbaijan
- Region: Central Aran
- Established: 8 August 1930
- Capital: Agdash
- Settlements: 74

Government
  - Governor: Tofig Ibrahimov

Area
  - Total: 1,020 km^{2} (390 sq mi)

Population (2020)
  - Total: 111,100
  - Density: 109/km^{2} (282/sq mi)
- Time zone: UTC+4 (AZT)
- Postal code: 0300
- Website: agdash-ih.gov.az

Agdash District (Azerbaijani: Ağdaş rayonu) is one of the 67 districts of Azerbaijan. It is located in the centre of the country, in the Central Aran Economic Region. The district borders the districts of Yevlakh, Shaki, Oghuz, Qabala, Goychay, Ujar, Zardab, and Barda. Its capital and largest city is Agdash. As of 2020, the district had a population of 111,100.

== Overview ==
Agdash city was established in the 16th century located at Arash on the silk road. The city is located in a convenient geographic place having propitious weather conditions such as mild and dry subtropical climate. The Turianchay River, the Kur river and the Shirvan Canal crosses the territory. There are unique Tugay forests along the Kur, which end in Turyanchay State Reserve. Also, there are beautiful gardens in Agdash. The territory of the region mainly consists of the plain, low mountain chain Bozdag, of about 700 m height located on the north part.

The district has a favourable economic and geographic location. Turyan River and Kura River along the South-West border extend through the territory of the rayon. Upper Shirvan Channel also crosses the Agdash region. This area is surrounded by Tugay forests along the Kura river bank, and Turyanchay State Preservation to the north.

== Population ==
Azerbaijanis make the basic population (98%) of the area Agdash and of the basic population of city Agdash. Other ethnic groups such as the Lezghins, the Kurds, the Tats make up the other 2% of the Agdash rayon's population. The average population density in the city equals 91 persons per square km.

Towns and Regions	2011			2012		
Towns and Regions	Total	Men	Women	Total	Men	Women
Agdash district	100,6	50,0	50,6	102,3	50,8	51,5
Agdash city	33,2	16,1	17,1	33,5	16,3	17,2
Villages	29,4	14,2	15,2	29,6	14,4	15,2

According to the State Statistics Committee, as of 2018, the population of the city recorded 108,700 persons, which increased by 18,700 persons (about 20.7 percent) from 90,000 persons in 2000. Of the total population, 54,200 are men and 54,500 are women. More than 26,5 percent of the population (about 28,900 persons) consists of young people and teenagers aged 14–29.

The population of the district by the year (at the beginning of the year, thsd. persons)
Region	2000	2001	2002	2003	2004	2005	2006	2007	2008	2009	2010	2011	2012	2013	2014	2015	2016	2017	2018	2019	2020	2021
Agdash region	90,0	91,0	91,7	92,4	93,3	94,4	95,5	96,6	97,5	98,4	99,3	100,6	102,3	103,3	104,4	105,5	106,7	107,9	108,7	109,9	111,1	112,0
urban population	27,1	27,8	28,4	29,0	29,7	30,4	31,1	31,6	32,2	32,8	33,0	33,2	33,5	33,7	35,3	35,5	35,8	36,0	36,2	36,4	36,7	36,8
rural population	62,9	63,2	63,3	63,4	63,6	64,0	64,4	65,0	65,3	65,6	66,3	67,4	68,8	69,6	69,1	70,0	70,9	71,9	72,5	73,5	74,4	75,2

== Economy ==
The core economy of the region is agriculture. Cotton-growing has started to evolve since the 19th century. The region has the potential of producing 20–25 tonnes of cotton. Moreover, in recent years it has become a priority to develop rice-paddy growing in extreme salinity sites. Silk-worm breeding is considered to be one of the ancient and traditional fields at the region.

The industry is relatively developed in the district. The main industrial sector of the district is processing. Leki Ginning Factory produces seedless raw cotton which provides 75–85% of all regional industrial production. In addition to that, the region has a developed plastic material and textile industry (Khosrov Metalplastmas Plant, Agdash Industrial Plant), food industry (Agdash Bread-Making Plant, Agdash Foodstuffs Plant) and production of construction materials (Kukel Brick Plant). Recently, “Orelay” and “FA com BICA” sweets production enterprises, “Arash” cooling water and “Arshin Malchin” textile plants have been put into operation in the region.

The region runs education, health, social, recreational and public catering facilities.

== Media ==
Two newspapers – “Agdash” and “Young Educators” are published in the district. The first issue of the "Agdash" newspaper was published on 7 January in 1932 under the title "Aghdash cotton man". The newspaper was distributed in Ganja under the names “Aghdash cotton man” in 1932–1937 years, “Combating for cotton” in 1938–1962, "New life" covering Agdash, Goychay, Gabala, Ujar, Kurdamir districts in 1962–1966, afterwards during 1966–2003 years it was published in Goychay as "Labor". The newspaper is distributed under the title "Agdash" from November 16, 2003. From 1938 to 1968, the editor of the newspapers "Combating for cotton" and "Labor" was Karim Abdullayev. The newspaper celebrated its anniversaries four times the 25th years in 1957, then 50th years in 1983, then 70th years in 2002 and the 75th years in 2007. In 1983, the newspaper was granted the Honorary Order of the Supreme Soviet of Azerbaijan. A group of newspaper labourers were granted diplomas and honorary decrees of the Journalists' Union of Azerbaijan and got the honorary degree of the district party committee in 1983. Two of the editors of the newspaper, Fikret Hajiyev and Fariz Rustamov, were granted the title of “Honored Writer” and the "Golden Pen" prize. The newspaper "Labor" has the satirical corner of "Zarabrin" and the scholarly association "Tər çiçəklər". The newspaper is distributed twice a month. The "Youthful Teacher" newspaper is the body of Agdash State Humanitarian College and has been distributed since 2000. The newspaper is published once a month.

== Infrastructure ==
The Baku-Qazakh highway, the Baku-Tbilisi railway, the Mingachevir-Baku power line, the Baku-Tbilisi-Ceyhan and Baku-Supsa oil pipelines, the Baku–Erzurum Pipeline pass through the region.

There are 5 substations and 277 transformers in Agdash district to provide the population with electricity. Natural gas supply has been established in 39 settlements. There is 3 water purification station in the area, artesian wells were drilled in 34 villages by the state. In 2009–2013, 31 subartezian wells were drilled and put into operation for irrigation. In 2013, 27 settlements of the district were provided with telephone communications. There are 32 post offices in the area in 2018.
