= Azerbaijan–Poland relations =

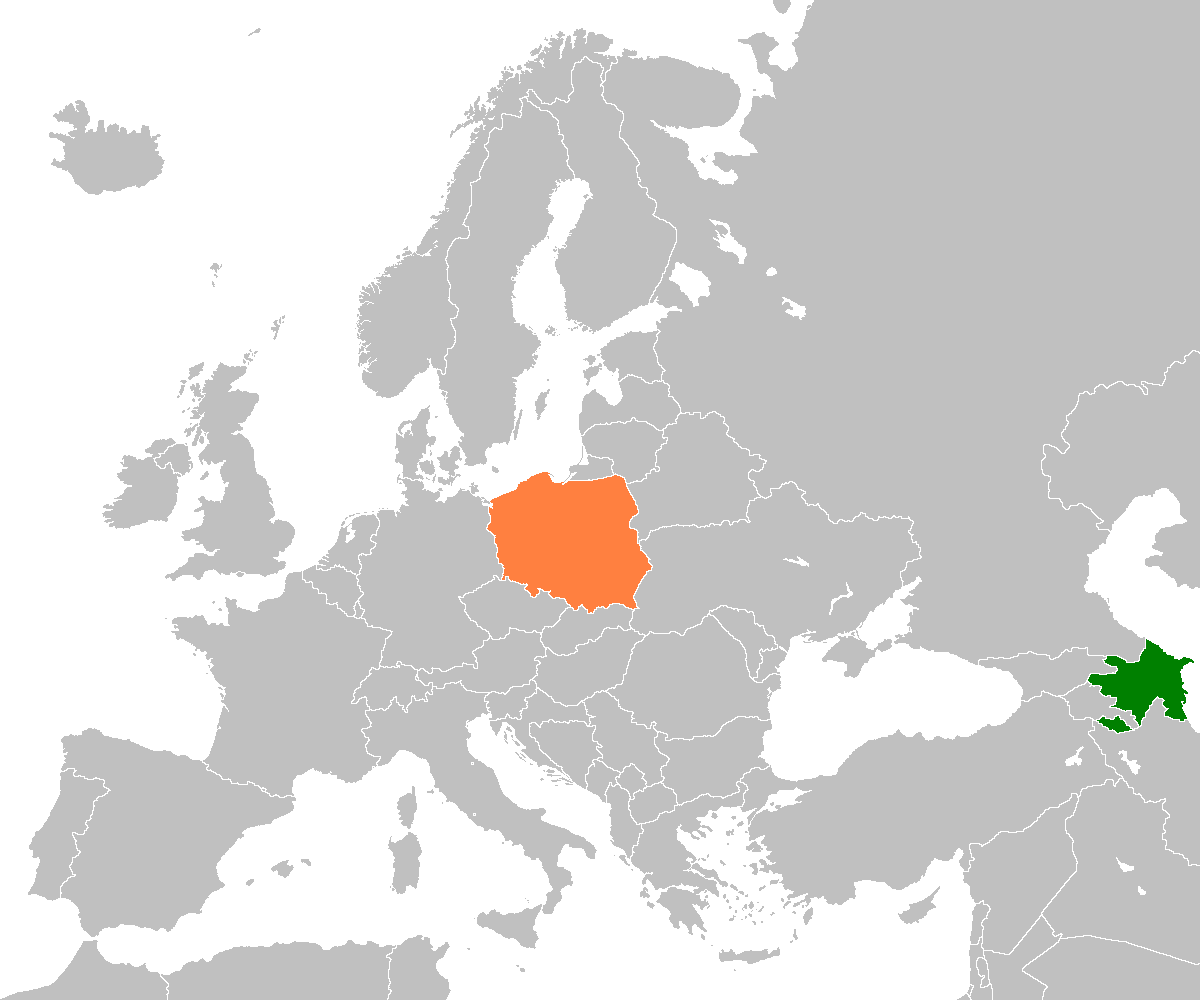

- Azerbaijan: Poland

Diplomatic mission
- Embassy of Azerbaijan, Warsaw: Embassy of Poland, Baku

Envoy
- Azerbaijan Ambassador to Poland Nargiz Gurbanova: Polish Ambassador to Azerbaijan Rafał Poborski

Foreign relations exist between Azerbaijan and Poland. The embassy of Poland opened in Azerbaijan on August 23, 2001, and the Azerbaijani Embassy in Poland on August 30, 2004. Both countries are full members of the Council of Europe and the Organization for Security and Co-operation in Europe (OSCE).

At present there are over a thousand self-identified Poles in Azerbaijan.

== Historical relations ==
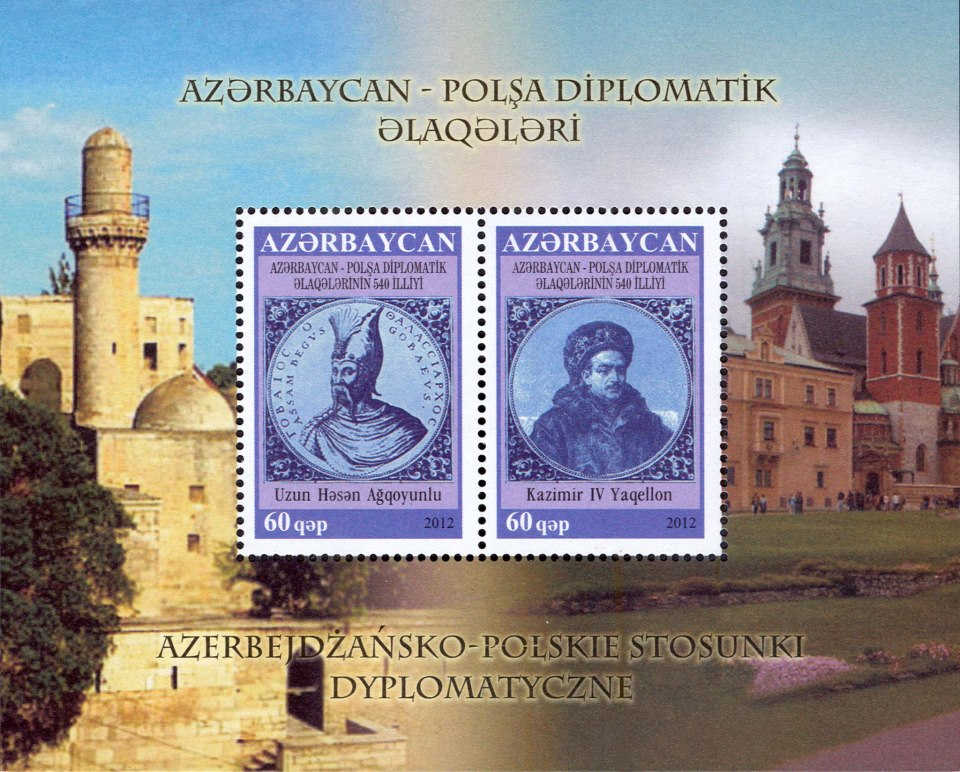
Stamp related to the 540th anniversary of Azerbaijan-Poland diplomatic relations, 2012

It is known from the ancient documents related to the historical relations between Azerbaijan and Poland that for the first time in 1472, during the Aq Qoyunlu, which was the State of Azerbaijan, and the Jagiellonian dynasty of Poland, diplomatic missions were exchanged between the two countries. So, in 1472, a diplomatic mission was sent to Poland by Aq Qoyunlu. Taking this into account, 2012 marks the 540th anniversary of the beginning of diplomatic relations between Azerbaijan and Poland.

Polish Ledinski and Azerbaijani Alimardan Topchubashov founded a special group together in the Duma to struggle for the autonomy of Poland and Azerbaijan. When Mammed Amin Rasulzade founded Azerbaijan Democratic Republic in 1918, which was the first secular and democratic republic in the Muslim world, the first chief of staff of the national army became Polish general Maciej Sulkiewicz. It is also notable that Rasulzade went to Poland in 1938 and he met his second wife Wanda who was a niece of Polish statesman Józef Piłsudski. During the Katyn massacre, Hamid Mahammadzadeh, an ethnic Azeri member of the Polish Officer Corps, was among 22,000 Polish nationals shot down by the NKVD, the Soviet secret police, in 1940.

== Recent political relations ==
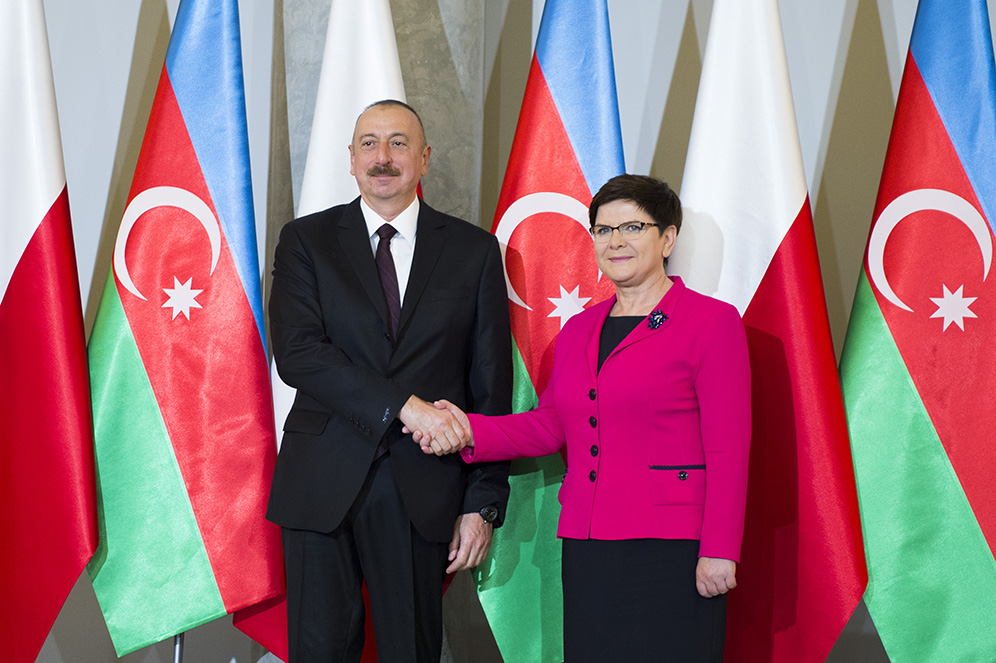
Beata Szydło and Ilham Aliyev, 2017.

Poland recognized Azerbaijan’s independence on December 27, 1991. They backed Azerbaijan for membership in both the Council of Europe and the World Trade Organization and declared its interest in participating in various energy projects. Poland supports Azerbaijan's bid to join the European Union and NATO. Poland supported Azerbaijan although it is now sporadic due to Poland’s recognition of Armenian genocide in which Azerbaijan protested against. Poland has culturally had friendly relations with Armenia for centuries. Moreover, new close relations with Azerbaijan and Polish Government's recent decision for its citizens to ask permission from Azerbaijan before visiting the Republic of Artsakh, resulted in the Polish government's decision being described as "anti-Armenian" by Armenian nationalist groups and youth organizations.

Poland's then President Lech Kaczyński visited Azerbaijan in 2007, and on February 26, 2008 President of Azerbaijan Ilham Aliyev paid a visit to Poland. A joint statement of both was signed during the visit. Poland has recognized the Armenian genocide.

Following the restoration of independence, several agreements between Armenia and Poland were signed, including a cultural cooperation agreement in 2000, a defense cooperation agreement in 2004, and an economic cooperation agreement in 2010.

== Economic relations ==
In 2008, for the first time in the history of its economic relations Azerbaijan gained trade surplus, and turnover of goods between the two countries reached $166.9 million. "Sarmatiya" company has been established to prepare technical details of Baku-Odesa-Brody-Płock-Gdańsk pipeline which seemed to be a legend for many years. It shows the increasing role of Azerbaijan in ensuring energy security of Poland.

== Cultural relations ==
In the middle of the 19th century the Azerbaijani heroic epos Koroghlu was translated by Aleksander Chodźko and published in English and French. Warsaw remains as the last place Abbasgulu Bakikhanov visited before his retiring. He wrote a whole number of poems and his famous "Asrar al-Malakut" (The Secrets of Heavens in the Arabic language) in Warsaw.

Ismayil Gutgashinli's "Rashid bey and Saadat khanum", which is notable for being the first Azerbaijani realistic prose, was published first in Poland in 1835.

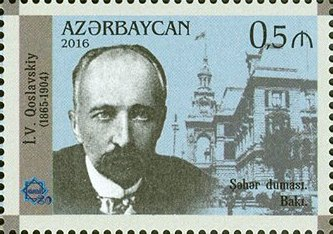
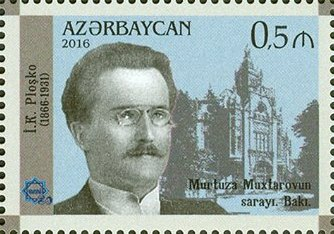
Polish architects Józef Gosławski and Józef Płoszko depicted on Azerbaijani postal stamps from 2016

Józef Gosławski, Józef Płoszko, Eugeniusz Skibiński and Kazimierz Skórewicz are notable for being the architects of a number of buildings in Azerbaijan. Ismailiyya Palace, Palace of Happiness, Building of Baku City Executive Power, Rylsky brothers' house, Agabala Guliyev's House, Tagiyev's Passage and present-day National Museum of History of Azerbaijan, Baku Puppet Theatre, Institute of Manuscripts and History Museum of the Prosecutor's Office are among them.

Polish Security Printing Works also supported Chopin Year 2010 and Miłosz Year 2011 in Azerbaijan. The Center for Polish Language and Culture at the Baku Slavic University was opened on November 9, 2006. Polish engineer Paweł Potocki presented the first project of oil extraction in the Caspian shelf and ensured its fulfillment.

Since 2019, there has been a significant increase in the number of students from Azerbaijan at Polish higher education institutions. Azeri students were the eighth largest group of foreign students in Poland in 2021, the sixth largest in 2022 and the fifth largest in 2023 and 2024.

== Resident diplomatic missions ==
- Azerbaijan has an embassy in Warsaw.
- Poland has an embassy in Baku.
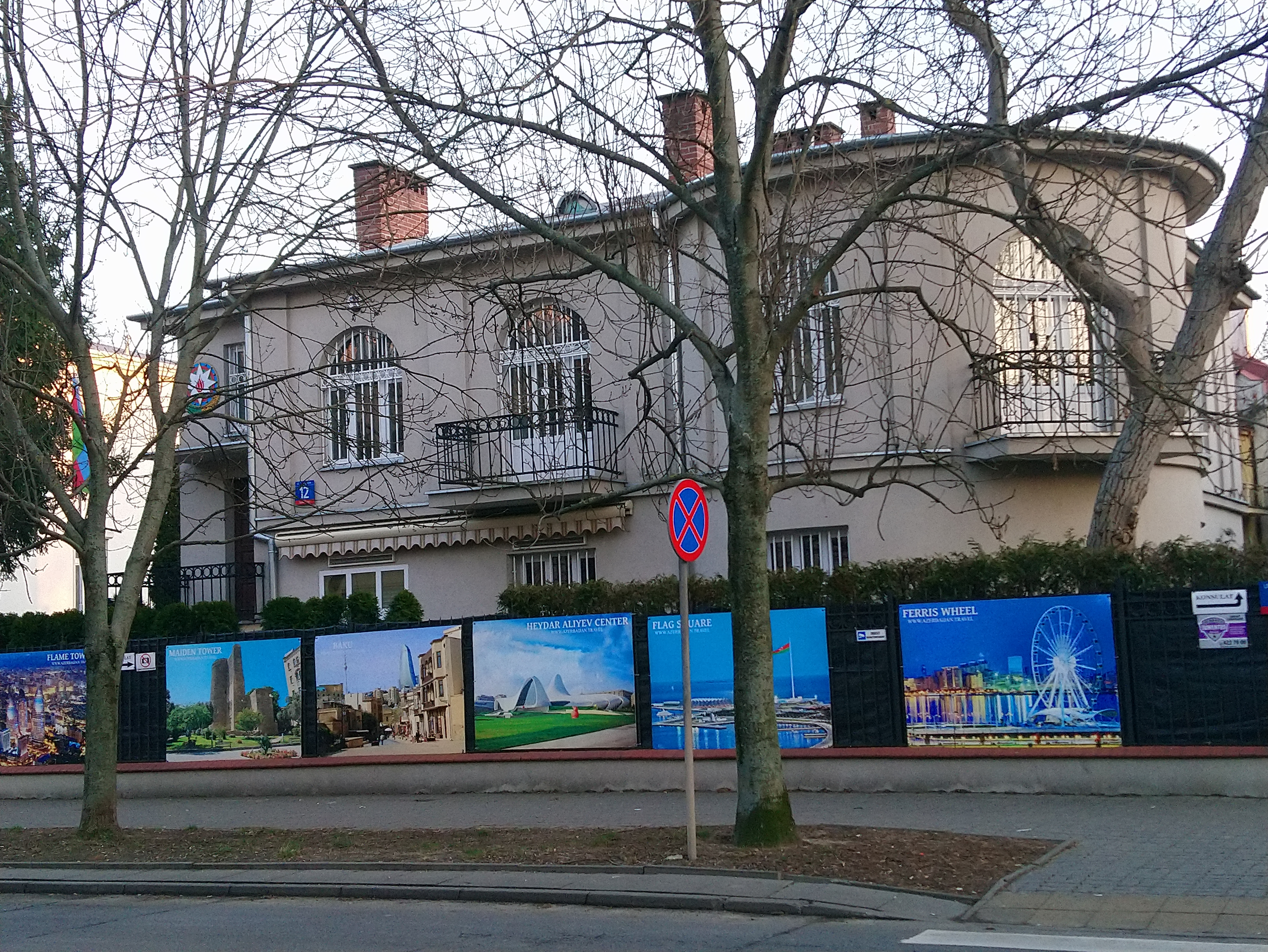
Embassy of Azerbaijan in Warsaw

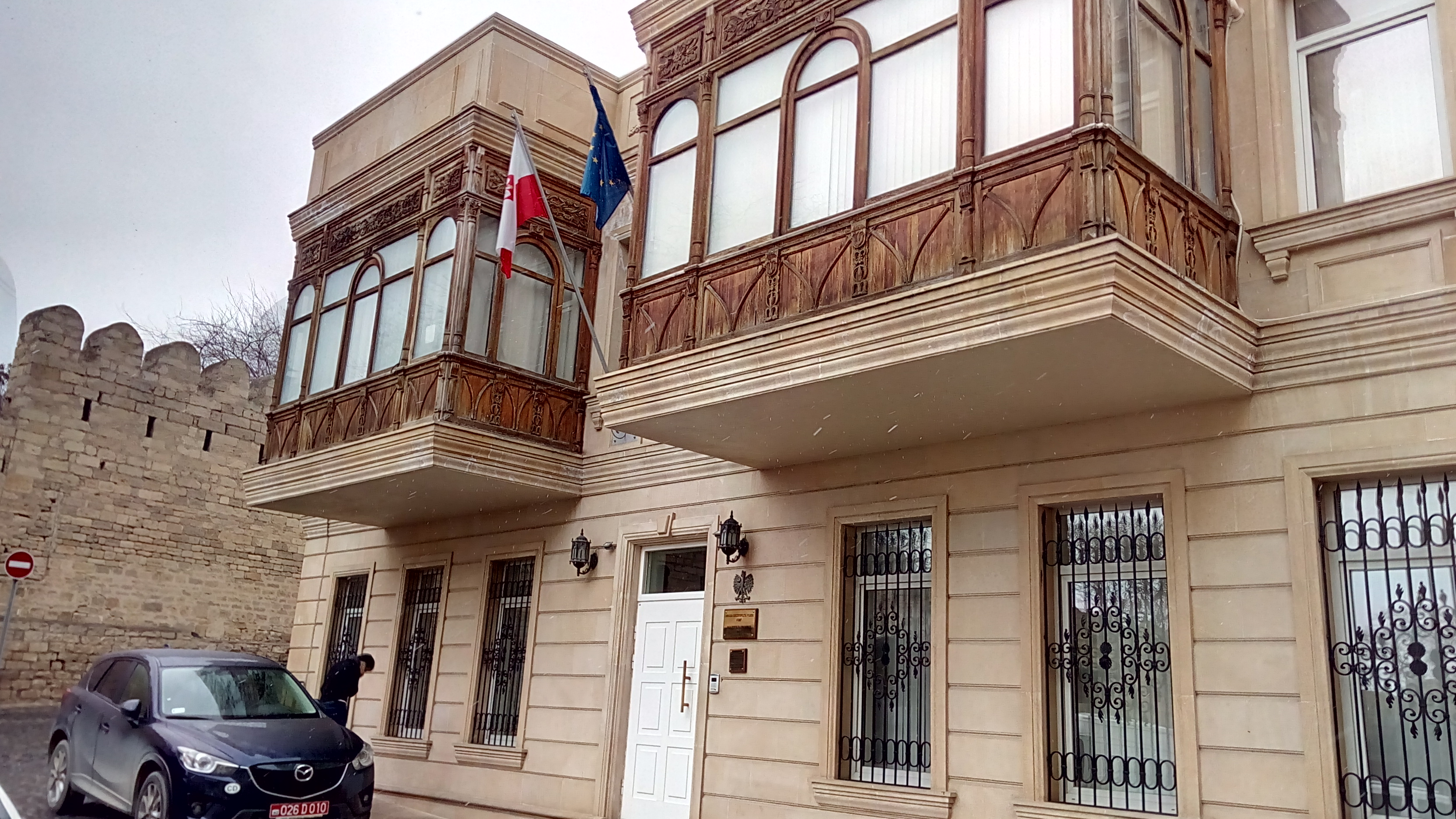
Embassy of Poland in Baku

== See also ==
- Foreign relations of Azerbaijan
- Foreign relations of Poland
- Azerbaijan-NATO relations
- Azerbaijan–EU relations
- Armenia–Poland relations
- Church of the Immaculate Conception, Baku
- The Spring to Come
- Ziya Bunyadov
- Tadeusz Swietochowski
- Azerbaijanis in Poland
- Poles in Azerbaijan
