= Poles in Azerbaijan =

Poles in Azerbaijan Polacy w Azerbejdżanie
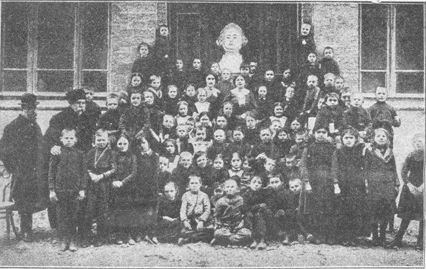
- Students and teachers of Polish School in Baku, 1903

Total population
- 2,000

Regions with significant populations
- Baku

Languages
- Polish • Azerbaijani

Religion
- Christian

There is a long history of Poles in Azerbaijan (Polish: Polacy w Azerbejdżanie, Azerbaijani: Azərbaycan polyakları). Although the current Polish population of the Republic of Azerbaijan is lower than in former times, the number of people with Polish descent in the capital city Baku is around 2,000 and several thousand self-identified Poles live in Azerbaijan. Poles as an ethnic group have lived in Azerbaijan for centuries. The Russian Empire included Azerbaijan and parts of Poland, thus it could deport members of opposition of Polish nationality there, which explains the presence of Poles in Azerbaijan.

== History ==
In the 17th century, missionaries Paul Wroczyński, Jedrzej Zielonacki and Alexander Kulesza set up a mission in Ganja, in the 1680s. The activities of the missionaries were an important link in understanding and rapprochement of the values of East and West. Missionaries and their followers brought gifts to the court of Shah in the form of valuable paintings, illuminated manuscripts of the Bible, etc. They also raised the subject of positive associations with the Polish people.

The Poles began to appear in Azerbaijan from the 13th century on, mainly as abductees, captured by the Mongol-Tatars, but also as those who came there voluntarily. Since the beginning of the 19th century, Azerbaijan was of interest to Polish travelers as well as romantic poets which can be seen through their work.

Poles in Azerbaijan appeared after I partition of Poland (1772). At this time Russia waged a war of aggression in the Caucasus, and as forced recruits here involved young men from all the occupied territories (mostly from Poland). Caucasus in the 19th century was, along with Siberia, one of the main places of exile Poles. After the first partition of Poland, they appear as recruits in the Caucasian Corps. In 1813, 10,000 Polish prisoners were sent to the Caucasus, most of them members of the Polish Legions in the Napoleon's army. In 1831, after the failed November Uprising a new wave of the exiled Polish insurgents arrived in Azerbaijan. The main points where the Poles were sent to military service, were in Azerbaijan - Quba, Qusar, Shamakhi, Ganja, Baku, and Zaqatala. Buildings of chapels, which were once built for the military Poles and their families in Quba and Zaqatala are still remaining there.

The next batch of repressed Poles were exiled to the Caucasus after the uprising of 1863 (the January Uprising). The Poles have referred to the Caucasus and in Transcaucasia until the end of the 19th century. By the beginning of the 20th century, 17,264 people have been resettled into the Caucasus. The last Polish exile in Azerbaijan, which has so far been identified, was Edward Strump. In 1900, in Warsaw, he published his book Pictures of the Caucasus. Some Polish exiles were completely deprived of their liberty and detained in custody in places like the island fortress and Zaqatala Nargin. Absheron peninsula was an intensively developed oil industry. This, in turn, created conditions for the emergence of new and development of traditional industries. Baku turned into an international city. In 1897 the Polish population was near two thousand. In 1913, employees were among the Poles in Baku were making 52.2%.

=== Polish community ===
Historical population
Year	Pop.	±%
1926	2,460	—
1939	2,270	−7.7%
1959	1,483	−34.7%
1970	1,264	−14.8%
1979	1,073	−15.1%
1989	712	−33.6%

In 1903, the Poles established a "Polish Charitable Society," which opened the library and school. On August 17, 1909, the company "Polish House in Baku," was registered whose goal was the cultural development of the Polish population. When the society began to function, another Polish School was established. At the beginning of World War I created the "Polish Committee of Baku on the organization of aid war-ravaged population of the Kingdom of Poland." This was associated with the appearance in Baku wave of Polish refugees. All Polish organizations were merged into "The Council of Polish Organizations in Baku." The Poles are also united by the Christian faith. Chapels were built at the locations of the Polish regiments in the Caucasus. In Baku, thanks to the Polish diaspora the government agreed to build a Christian church. Local people called it Polish church. During Stalin's times the church was destroyed. The building of another Christian church, built by the Poles in the city Qusar survived. This building today is known among locals as "The Polish Christian church."

With the establishment of Soviet power in Azerbaijan, many Poles left the country and returned to their historical homeland. The activities of the Polish organizations (as well as other national associations) were banned. Many persons of Polish origin were forced to change nationality.

The idea of Polish organization was first expressed by Ofilom Ismailov (Kulchitsky) in 2000. In 2001, he gathered a group of people of Polish descent of 16 people and put forward a proposal for the creation of the Polish community, while noting that, according to the census beginning of the 1990s, Azerbaijan population of Poles were close to thousand. Following his suggestion Elena Teer, who was fluent in Polish was chosen as the chairman of the organization. However, the selected governing bodies of the Polish organizations were not active enough in the future, and the decision of the meeting lost its validity for the Ministry of Justice. Under existing legislation, the documents for registration of the organization should be submitted no later than one month from the date of the meeting, which was not done. In 1991 they've established a Polish community organization called "Polonia".

=== Catholic role ===
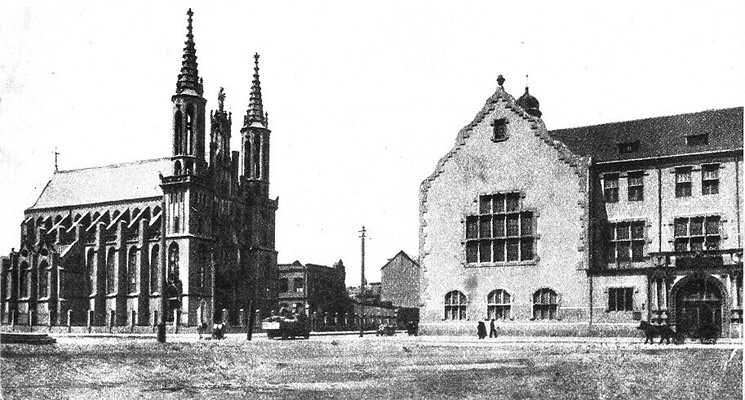
The old Church of the Blessed Virgin Mary's Immaculate Conception (on the left) in Baku

Roman Catholic Benevolent Society and the Polish Community were formed on 5 January 1903. The Society opened a library-reading room. Scheduled was a refuge for old people and children. Reading was the only company in a free reading room. Chairman of the Society was known oil magnate Stefan Rylski. Society headquarters building located in Rilski. This building (architect Józef Płoszko) has been preserved to this day. (Street Memmedeliyev, 11). April 27, 1903, he was enlightened by the Cathedral of the Immaculate Conception of the foundation of the Blessed Virgin Mary. At that time, the number of Catholics have already reached 9-10 thousands of people.

Father Stefan Demurow was pastor of a Catholic church in Baku. Demurow Stefan was born in Tbilisi in 1871, graduated from seminary in 1895. and before the arrival in Baku was the pastor of a Christian church in Kutaisi (1895–1902) and Perekopiu (1902–1904).

The Stalinist era was very damaging to religious organizations. From the 1930s the Soviet regime began mass repression, arresting one thousand priests. In 1938, the Catholic church in Baku was destroyed. But Catholics were meeting secretly, with risking their own life. Demurow was arrested on November 14, 1937, and sentenced to death. After the tragic events in Azerbaijan Catholicism ceased to exist. The revival occurred only after the collapse of the Soviet Union. In 1992 a group of Poles in Baku asked the Vatican to create opportunities for the pastoral care of religious Poles. After the collapse of the Soviet Union in 1997 group of Polish Christians with a priest from Poland - Jerzy Pilyus arrived in Baku. In 2002 Pope John Paul II officially visited Azerbaijan. He was initially invited by Azerbaijan's then president, Heydar Aliyev. Thanks to his visit, President Aliyev gave the Catholic Church a plot of land to build a church. The building was funded by proceeds from Pope John Paul II's book sales and foreign donations.

=== Poles' role in Azerbaijan's history ===
The first Polish social organizations in Azerbaijan were created at the beginning of the twentieth century in Baku. Many Poles were living in Azerbaijan at that time. Even earlier, in the 19th century, the Poles were visiting Azerbaijan for various reasons such as political exiles, the tsarist army soldiers recruited from the Polish Kingdom, as well as Poles looking for a good job, especially during the dynamic development of Baku city - the so-called oil boom at the beginning twentieth century. There was then in Baku several Polish organizations - the Council of Polish Organisations, Association "Polish House", the Polish Society of Mutual Aid, "Focus", Polish Benevolent Society, and even the Union of Polish Youth.

The Poles have made a major contribution to economic development, scientific, cultural, education areas of the country. There were doctors, teachers, and military engineers among them.

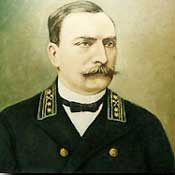
Witold Zglenicki

The largest contribution to the economic development of Azerbaijan has made by Witold Zglenicki. He was a pioneer engineer Witold sourcing crude oil from the seabed, has developed a project life of these deposits and the invention was of great importance for further economic development in Azerbaijan. He also sponsored a foundation for the development of Polish culture and science which brought him the reputation as the "Polish Nobel".

In Azerbaijan, prominent scholars of Polish origin also lived who have made a major contribution to the scientific and technical development. In 1919 Baku State University was established, which was of great importance for the overall development of the whole scientific system in a country that was backward at that time. Among the lecturers there were many professors of Polish origin. In the medical field - prof. Paul Zdrodowski (microbiology), prof. Uszyński, Malinowski, Różanowski, Berłacki, Mizernicki, Zamuchowski, in the social sciences - prof. Alexander Makowielski, Wsewołod Bronisław Tomaszewski, Aleksander Selichanowicz, M. Dabrowski, M. Downar-Zapolski, Associate Professor P. Piłaszewski, in other fields - prof. K. Krasuski (chemistry), Associate Professor P. Michalewski (geophysics) were among them.

Stanislaw Despot-Zenovich, who made a great deal for the improvement of the city was Mayor of Baku 16 years (1878–1894). Paul Potocki (1879–1932) was the first who applied the technique of draining the sea bottom for oil in the filling of the bay Bibiheybət. The first rector of the Baku Polytechnic Institute, was Professor Nicholas Dombrowski.

Several prominent musicians of Polish descent were born in Azerbaijan, including Soviet cellist and conductor Leopold Vitoldovich Rostropovic [ru], and his son, Soviet and Russian cellist Mstislav Rostropovich. The conductor of Opera and Ballet Theater in Baku was Vladimir Trahimovich, a teacher of piano Regina Sirovich, author of the best and relevant to the present day tutorial for piano (co-authored with L. Egorova), a famous jazz musician, Bronislaw Posadovsky were also among known Poles of Azerbaijani music scene.

Many Poles have left Azerbaijan after the Russian Revolution while other Polish families were leaving the country for various reasons, often because of better jobs and opportunities for children to learn and work in the Russian capitals - Moscow and Leningrad. After the revolution, most local authorities did not pay attention to the nationality of the citizens' personal documents. In the first years after the Revolution, local authorities often recorded in the documents of the Poles as a "Russian".

==== Architecture ====
Architecture was the area that probably the Poles most contributed to. Józef Gosławski and Józef Płoszko are especially notable, with other including Eugeniusz Skibiński and Kazimierz Skórewicz.

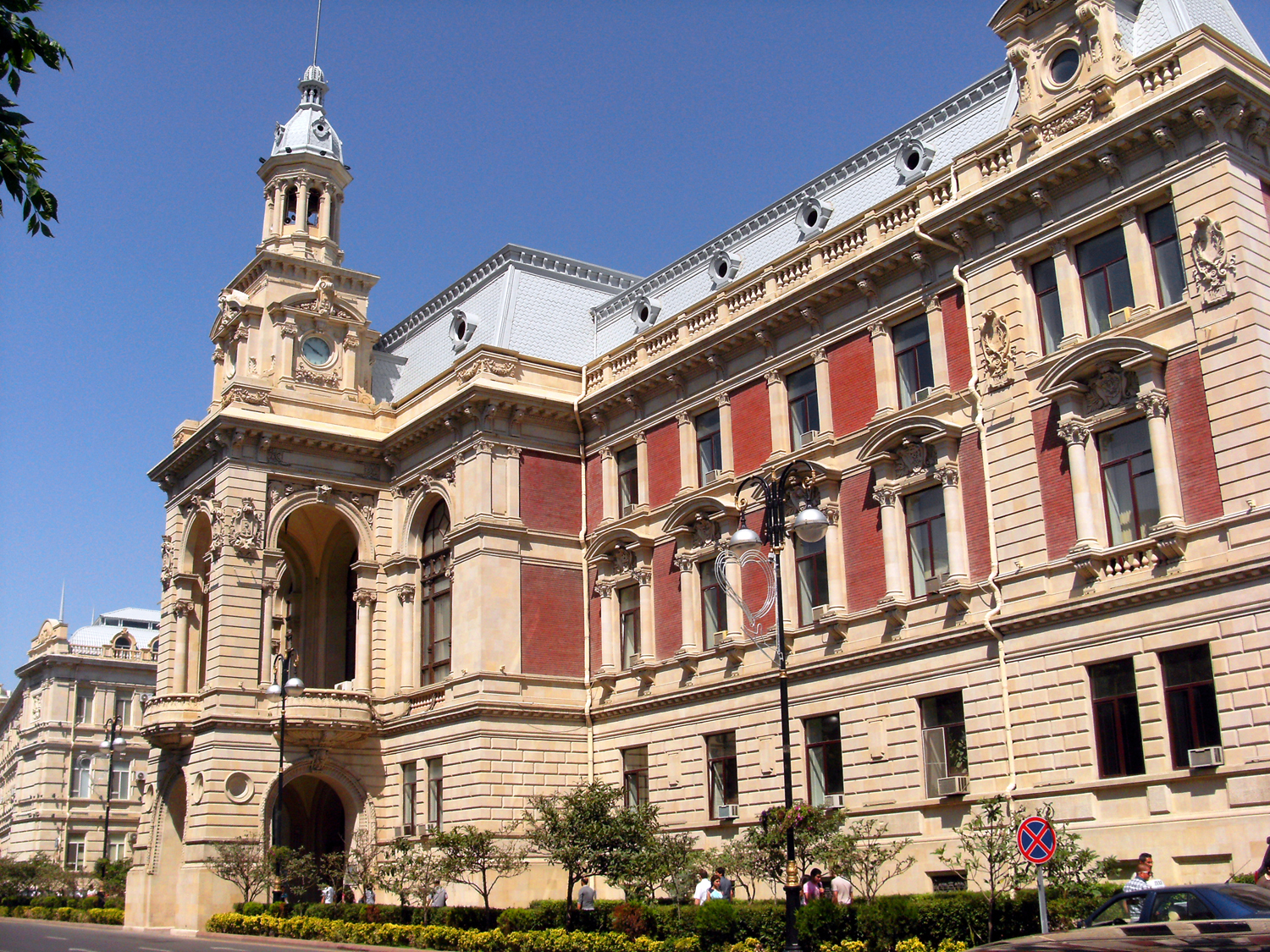
Building of Baku City Executive Power, by Gosławski

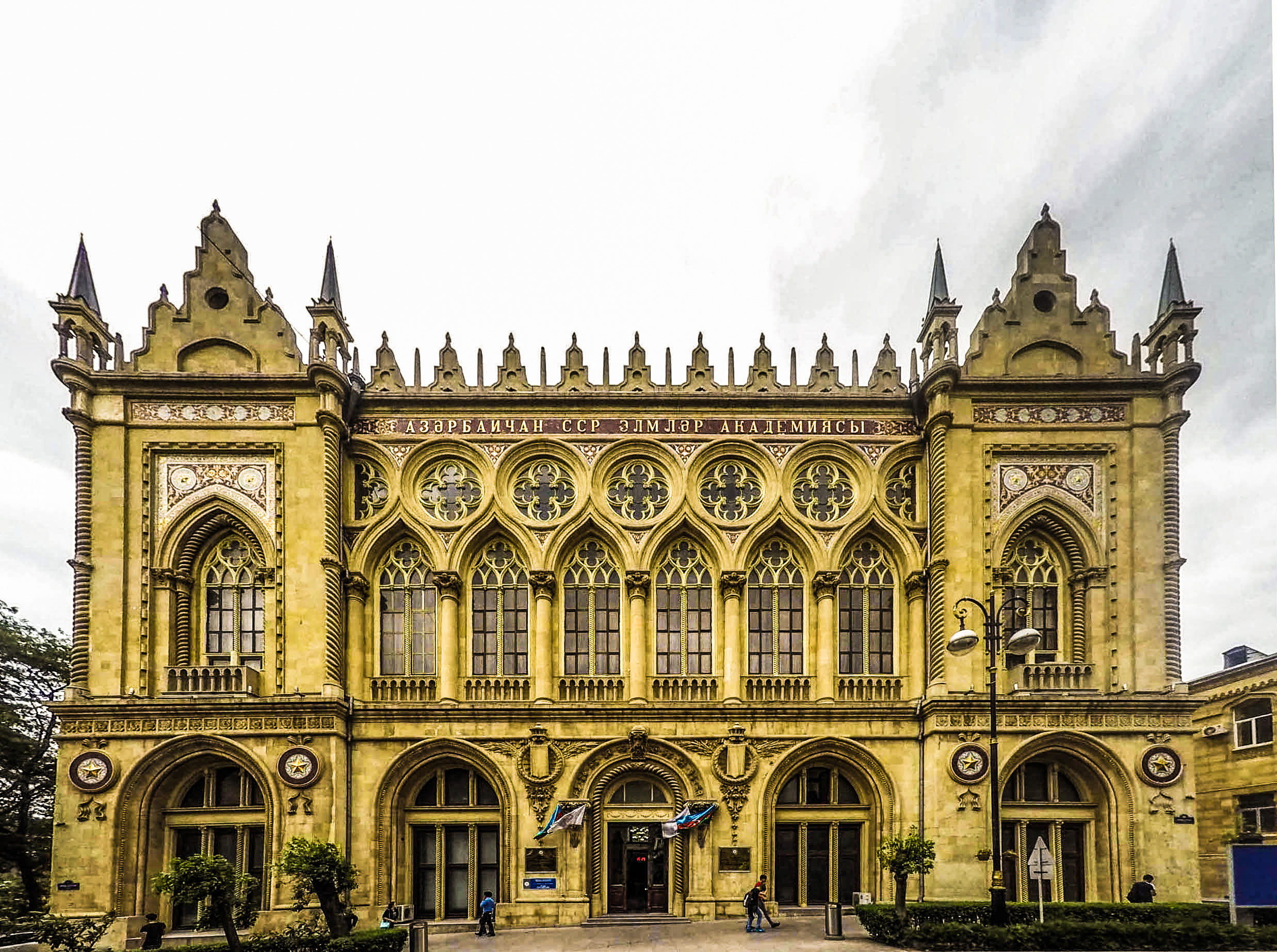
Ismailiyya Palace, by Płoszko

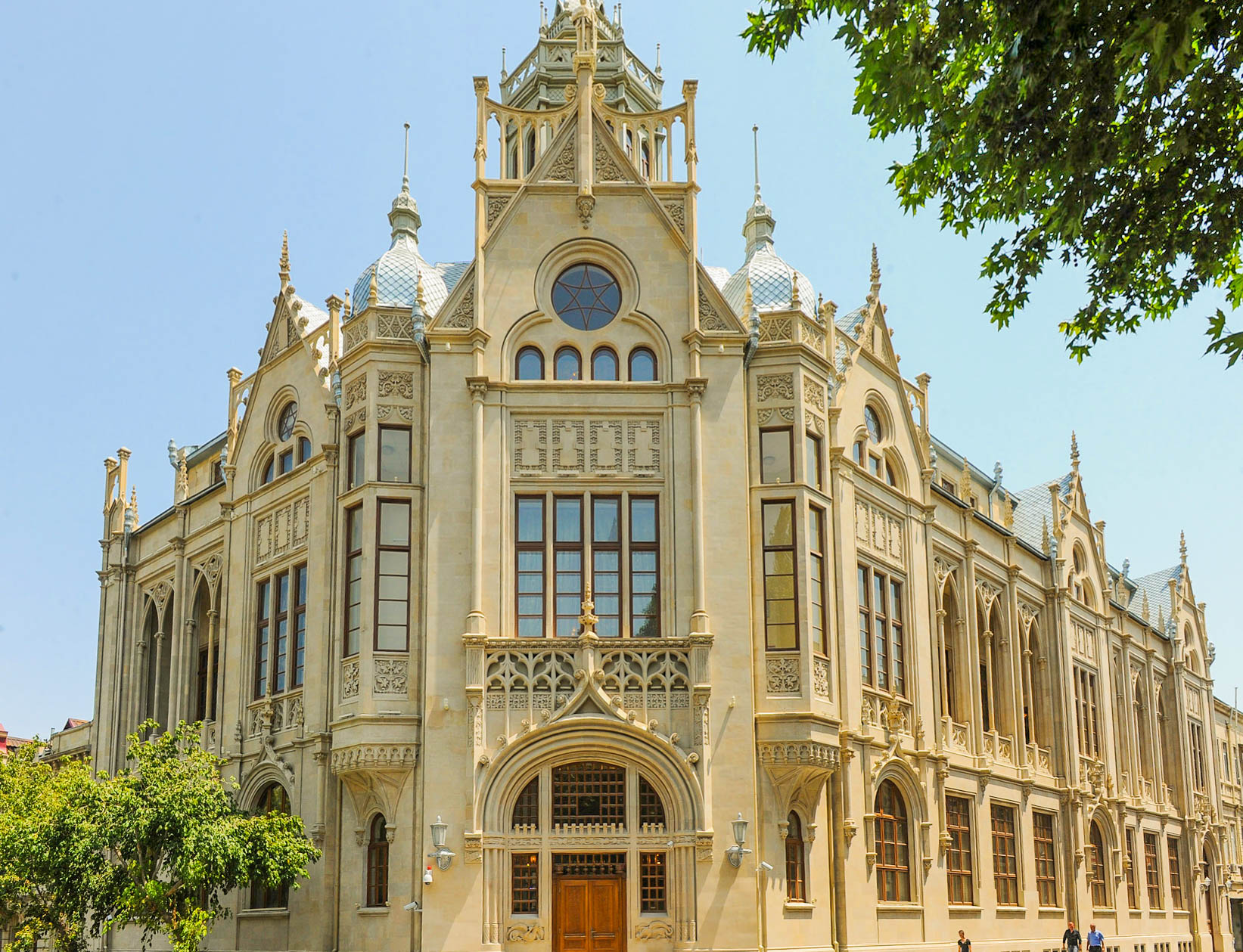
Palace of Happiness, by Płoszko

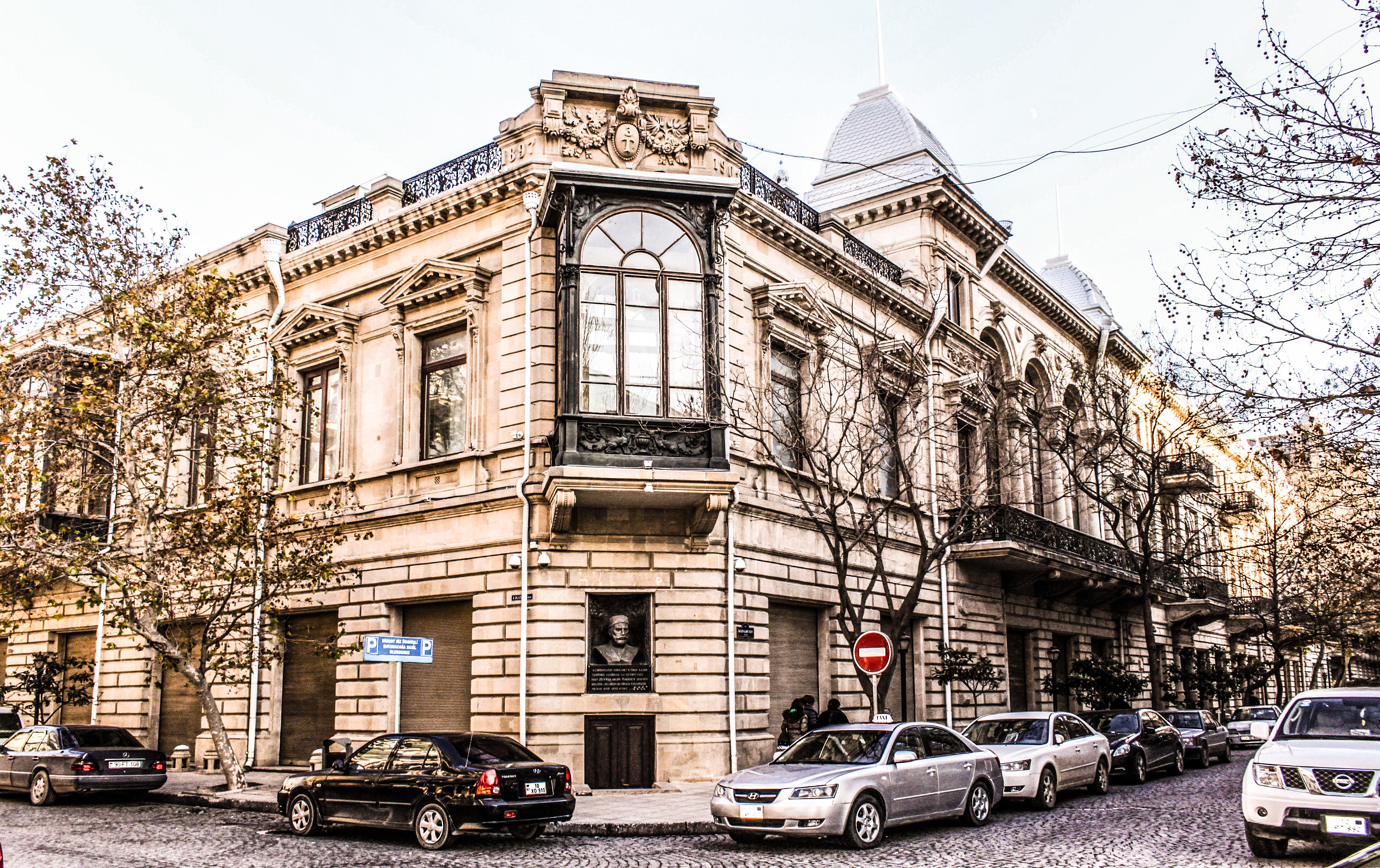
Palace of Zeynalabdin Taghiyev, by Gosławski

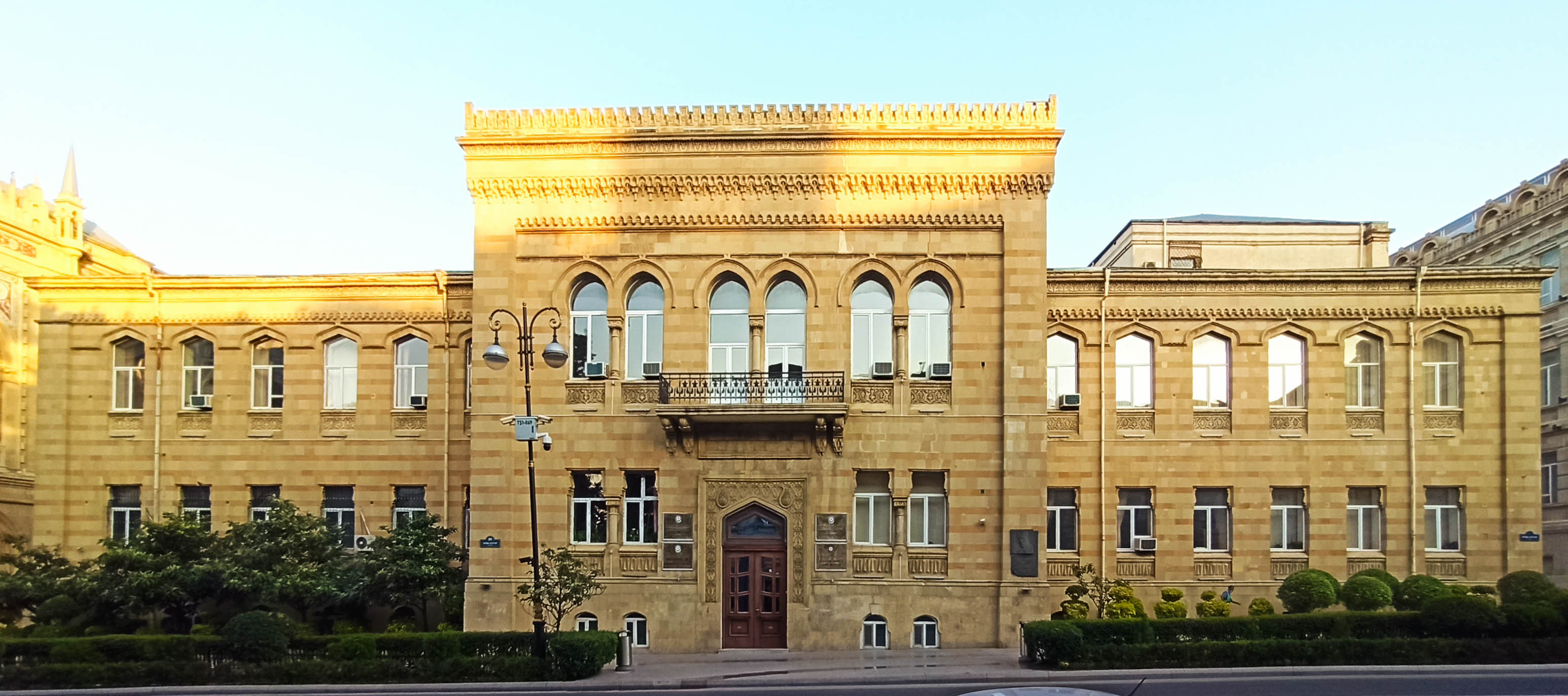
Building of the Institute of Manuscripts, by Gosławski

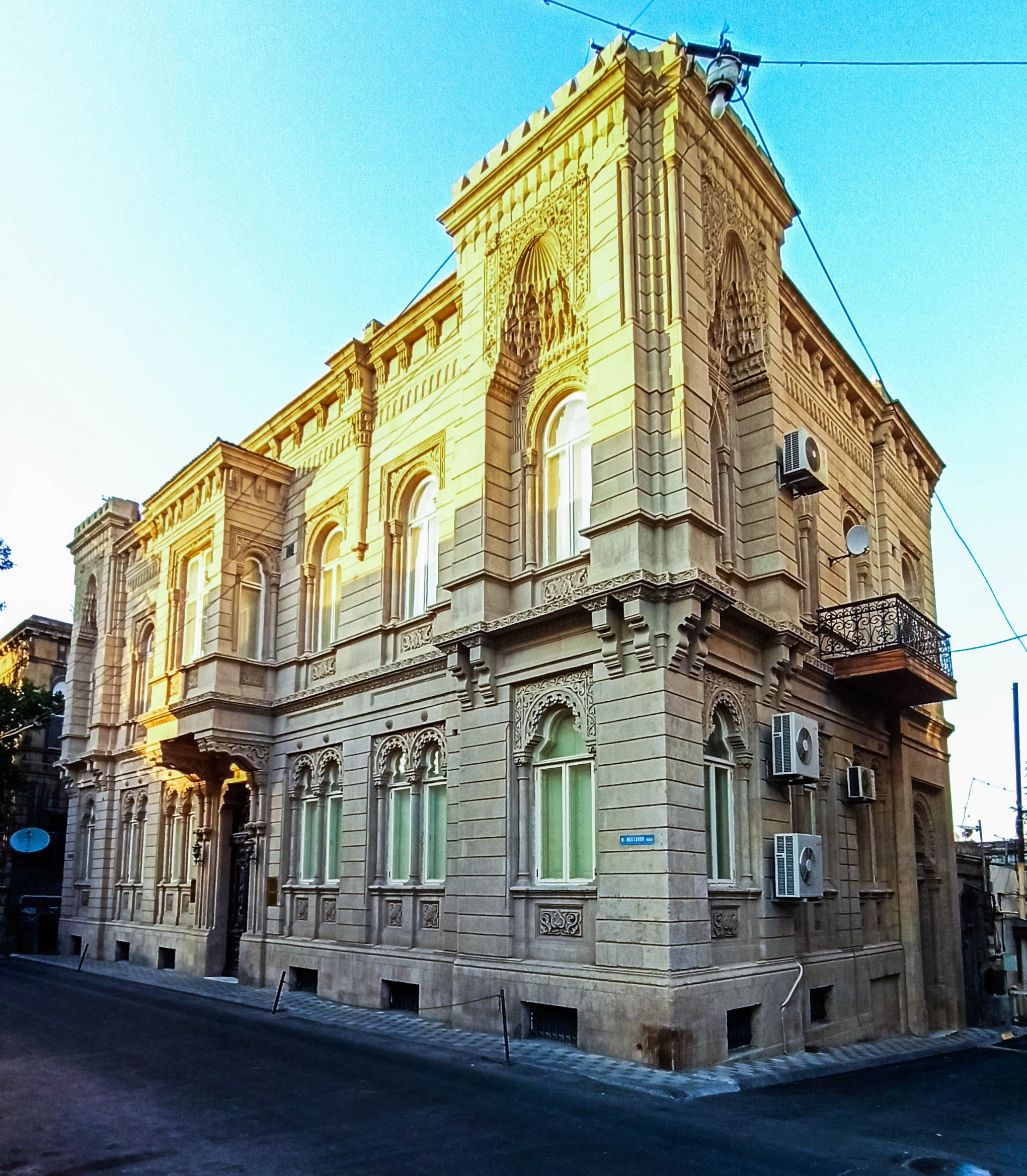
Building of the Union of Architects of Azerbaijan, by Skibiński

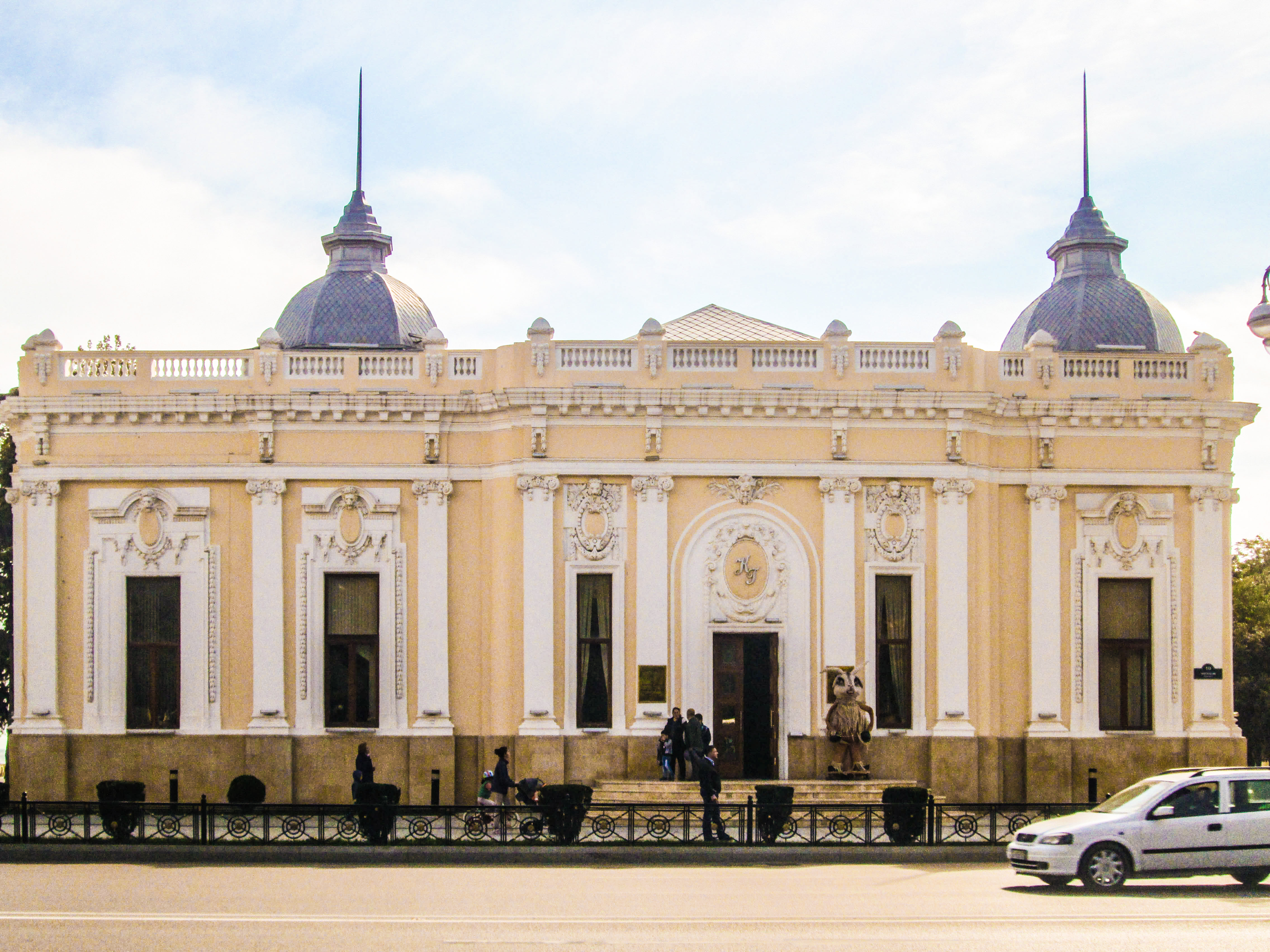
Baku Puppet Theatre, by Płoszko

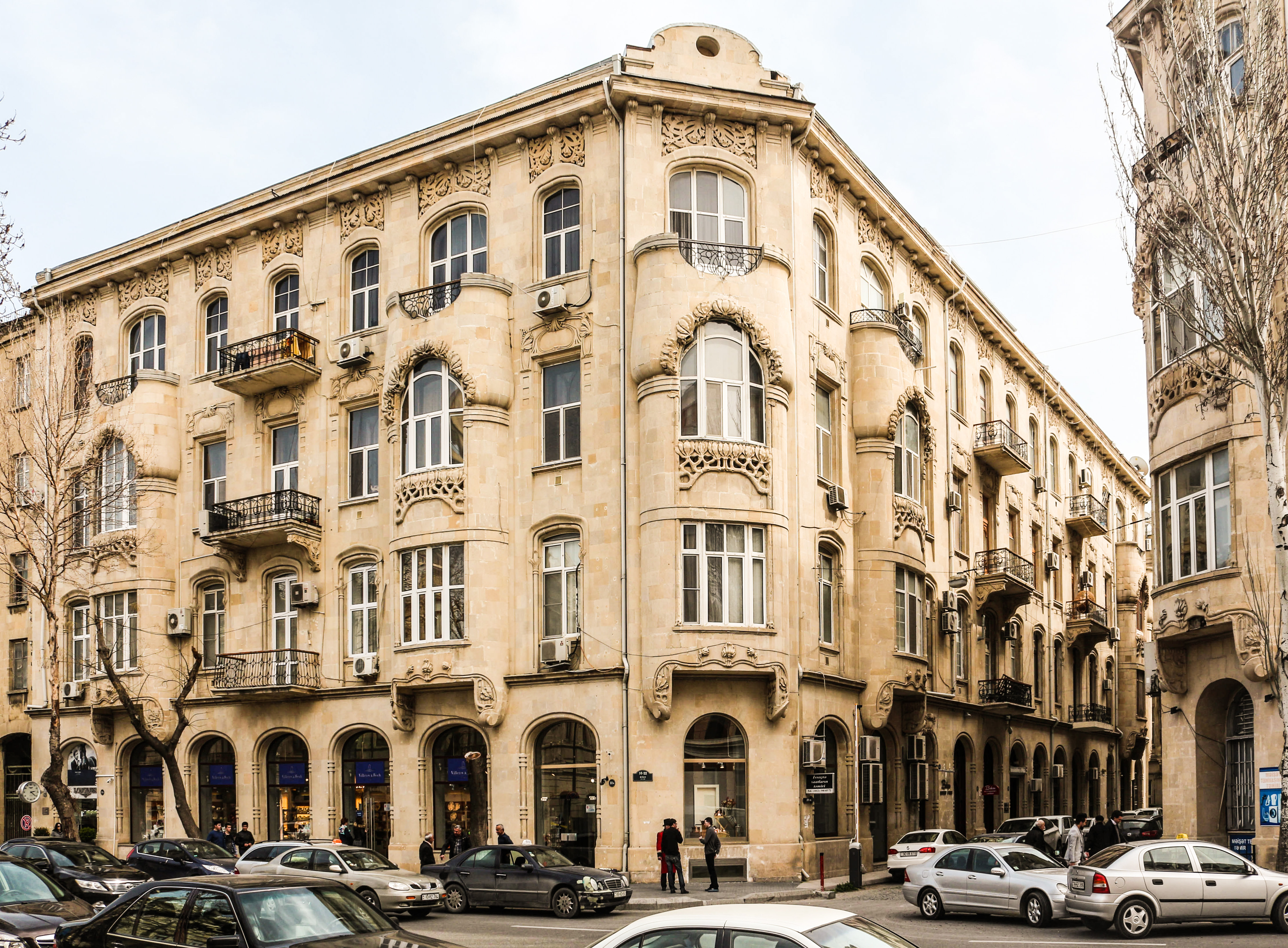
House of Musa Naghiyev, by Płoszko

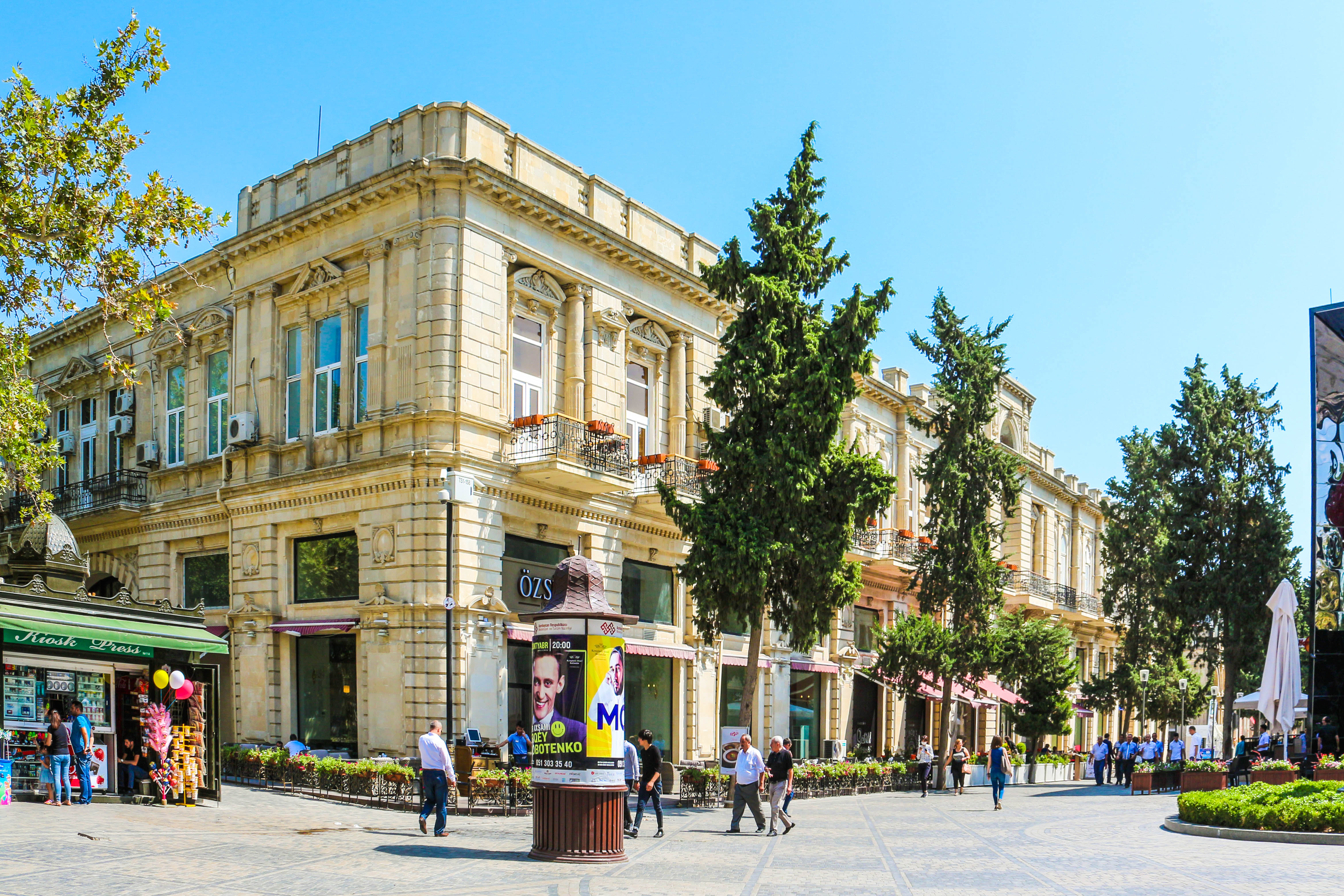
Tagiyev's Passage, by Skórewicz

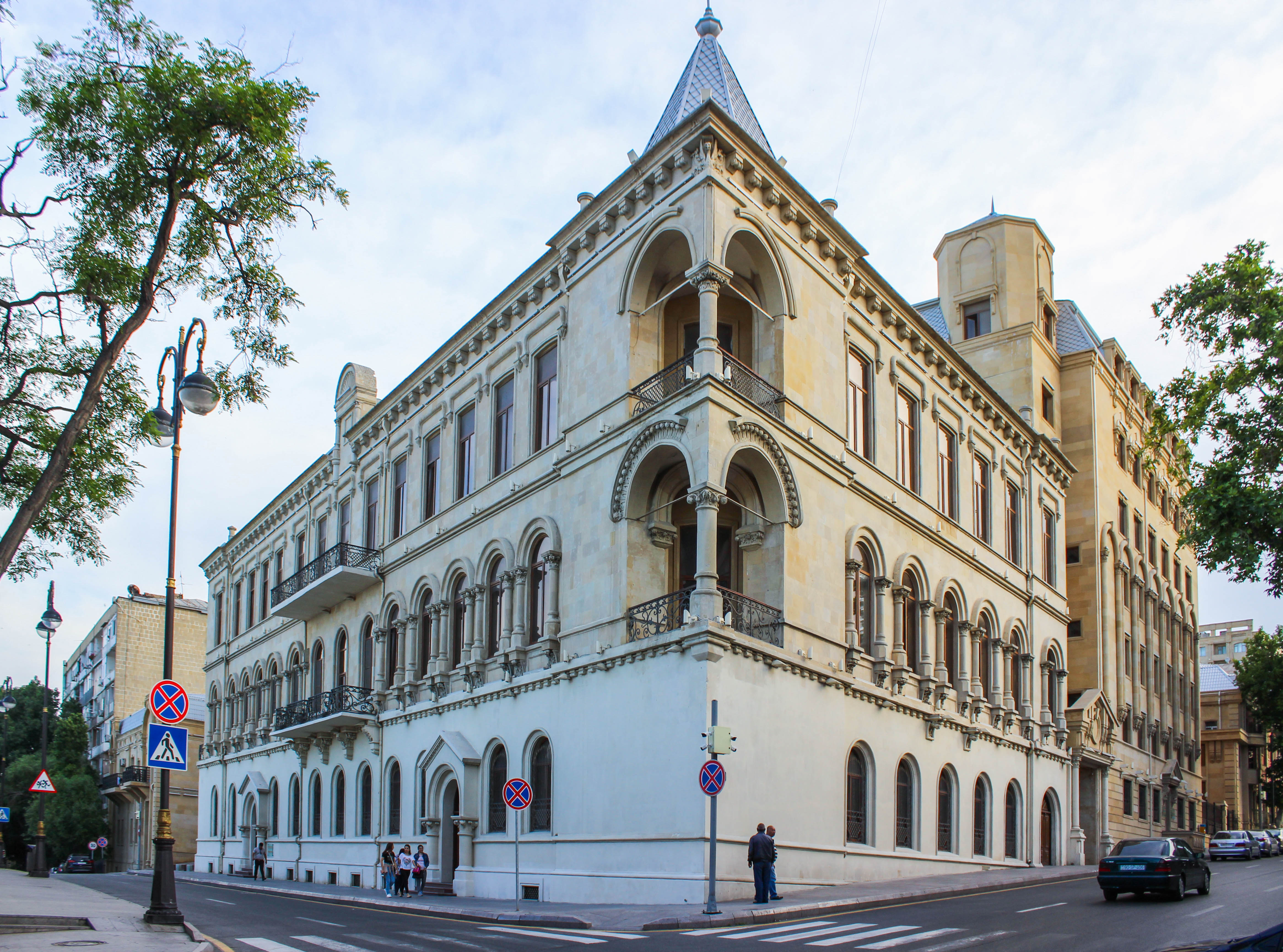
History Museum of the Prosecutor's Office, by Skórewicz

== Notable people ==
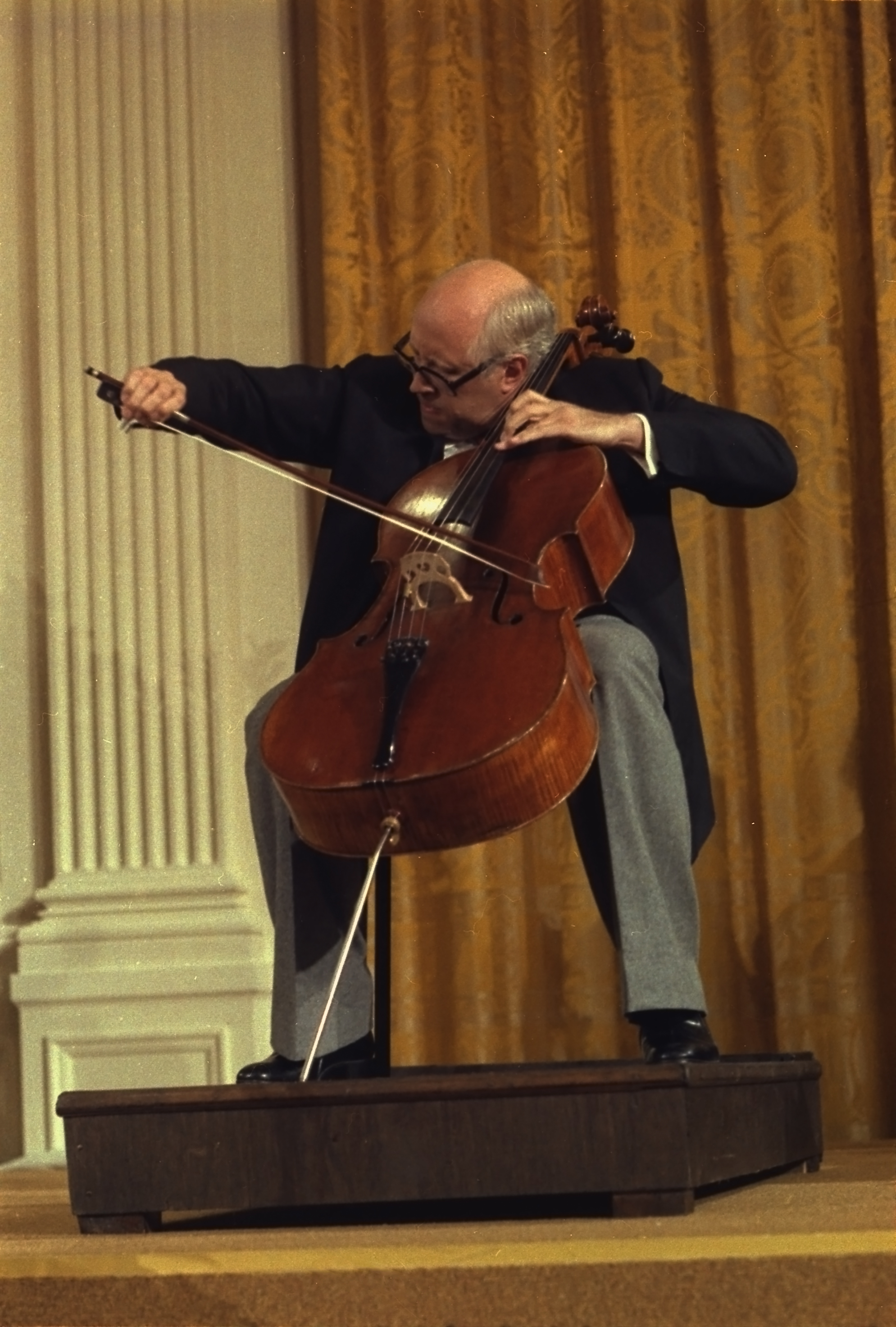
Mstislav Rostropovich

- Józef Gosławski, sculptor
- Józef Płoszko, architect
- Michał Abramowicz, geologist
- Andrey Vyshinsky, Soviet politician.
- Maciej Sulkiewicz, first General Staff of Azerbaijani Armed Forces
- Alexander Makovelsky, a philosopher, corresponding member of the Academy of Sciences of USSR
- Mstislav Rostropovich, world-known cellist
- Witold Zglenicki, geologist and philanthropist, "Polish Nobel"
- Stephen Skshyvan, an engineer, builder of aqueducts
- Paul Zdrodovsky, Microbiologist
- Jozef Essman, hydraulic

== See also ==
- Azerbaijan–Poland relations
- Polish diaspora
- Ethnic minorities in Azerbaijan
- Church of the Immaculate Conception, Baku
- The Spring to Come
- Polish Architects Street
