= Polish Architects Street =

Alley in the Sabail district of Baku, Azerbaijan

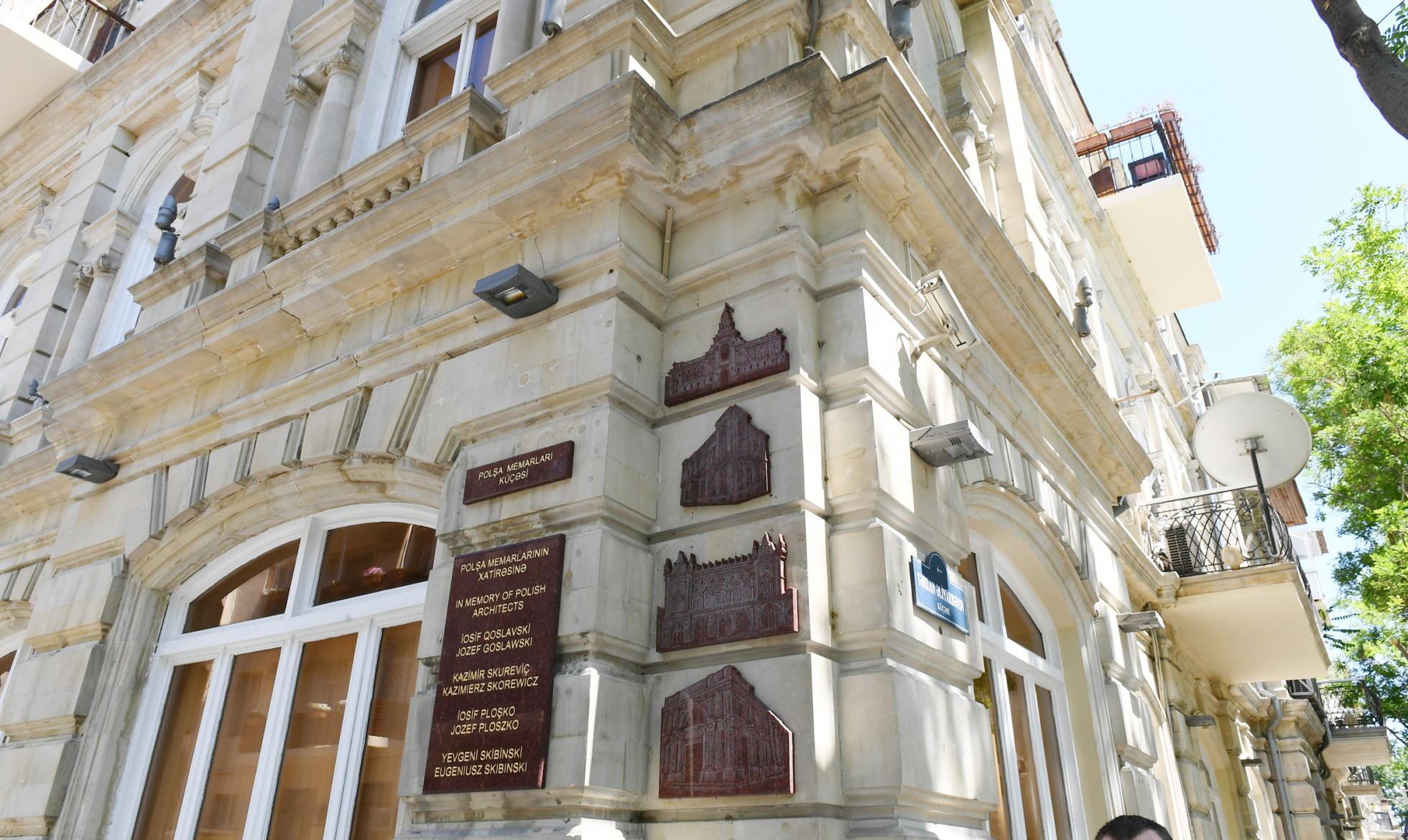
- Maintained by: City of Baku
- East end: Haji Zeynalabdin Taghiyev street
- West end: Tarlan Aliyarbayov street

Polish Architects Street is an alley located in the Sabail district of Baku, Azerbaijan. The alley was named after one of the alleys in the historic district of Baku to perpetuate the names of Polish architects.

== About ==
The alley is named in honor of Polish architects who worked in one of the historical neighborhoods of Baku. In one of the buildings there is a memorial plaque with the names of Polish architects - Józef Gosławski, Kazimierz Skórewicz, Józef Płoszko and Eugeniusz Skibiński, and stone carvings of Murtuza Mukhtarov's palace, Ismailiyya Palace, Baku City Executive Power building, Agabala Guliyev's House of which they were the architects, were painted. The author of the memorial plaques is the Honored Architect of Azerbaijan, Elbay Gasimzade. The nearest metro station to the alley is Sahil station.
