= The Spring to Come =

Book by Stefan Żeromski

The Spring To Come
- Author: Stefan Żeromski
- Original title: Przedwiośnie
- Translator: Bill Johnston
- Language: Polish
- Genre: Novel
- Publisher: Central European University Press
- Publication date: 1924
- Publication place: United States
- English publication date: 2007
- Media type: Print (Paperback)
- ISBN: 963-7326-89-8

Przedwiośnie (a title translated as First Spring, Before the Spring, Early Spring, Springtime, or, most commonly, as The Spring To Come) is a novel by Polish neoromantic writer Stefan Żeromski, and first published in 1925, the year he died. The book has been translated and published in the U.S. as The Coming Spring in 2007.

The novel consists of three parts: Szklane Domy (Glass Houses), Nawłoć (Nawłoć [Estate]), and Wiatr od wschodu (The Eastern Wind). It is set between 1914–1924, before and during the reconstitution of Poland as the Second Polish Republic, including the Polish–Soviet War. As the Russian Revolution breaks out, the main character, Cezary Baryka, escapes from Baku with his father, a Polish political exile from Siberia (see also, Poles in Azerbaijan). The father dies en route to the newly formed Polish state. Cezary enters Poland alone, the country of his parents, having never been there before. The novel tells of his disillusionment as the Poland he discovers does not resemble that of which his father told him, a feeling only magnified by the Baryka's deep suspicion of the Bolshevik solutions about the poor.

In 1928, an adaptation of the novel was premiered, directed by Henryk Szaro – the film is now considered lost. A live action version was released in two formats in Poland on 2 March 2001, adapted and directed by Filip Bajon, produced by Dariusz Jabłoński, and featuring Mateusz Damięcki as Cezary Baryka. It was the third most popular film in Poland for the year with 1.7 million admissions. A five-hour miniseries version was broadcast on Polish television, and a 138-minute cut distributed to theatres.

== Plot ==
=== Part one – Glass Houses ===
Cezary Baryka is a teenager growing up in Baku in a well-off household with both parents. As World War I breaks out and his father loses his grip on his son due to departure, Cezary begins to rebel against his mother and stops attending classes due to the communist revolution in his hometown. In the beginning, he is devoted to the cause but later begins drifting apart from other revolutionaries, due to their violent means of exerting control. As his mother dies due to mandatory labor and food shortages, a conflict breaks out between Tatars (a term then used in the region specifically to refer to Azerbaijanis) and Armenians. His rebellious world view begins to fade away upon seeing the dead body of a beautiful Armenian woman. He becomes firm in his belief that revolution brings about suffering. Later, he is reunited with his father – believed to be dead – who is eager to revisit Poland. During the journey, his father convinces his son that Poland has become a land of progress and prosperity. Shortly after his father's death, Cezary Baryka reaches Poland and is disappointed by his sight – Poland is devastated by the war and isn't the utopia his father prophesied.

=== Part two – Nawłoć Estate ===
After a while, Cezary reaches Warsaw and meets his mother's former lover – Simon Gajowiec, a proponent of slow reform and work at grassroots. Soon, swept by the enthusiasm of his peers, he joins his compatriots fighting the advancing Bolshevik forces. During the combat, he meets Hipolit Wielosławski, who invites him to an estate in Nawłoć. There he becomes disgruntled at the decadence of the once prospering Polish aristocracy and attempts to converse with the hired laborers. Soon he gets swept up into many affairs including Caroline (whom Cezary flirts with), Wanda (secretly in love with him), and Laura (an older woman who Cezary begins to adore). Laura ends up marrying a wealthy, yet sickly man, and Wanda poisons Caroline, convinced that Cezary is in love with her.

=== Part three – The Eastern Wind ===
Cezary returns to Warsaw, seeking a job from Simon. Convinced that both revolution and a return to tradition are futile attempts to improve the well-being in Poland, begins a correspondence with Anthony Lulek – a devoted Marxist rhetorician. Cezary rejects Simon's political actions, convinced that he is not doing anything to unite Poland, relieve the oppressed of their duties, and accuses him of cowardice. Cezary reunites once again with Laura and learns that the woman loved him deeply and is saddened by the fact that she had to marry to save her reputation. He ends up leaving her without solace. As spring comes by, Cezary dressed up in an army suit joins a protest of unionized workers, heading head-straight into stationed police forces, in front of the protest.

== Analysis ==
=== Revolution ===
Even though the communist leaders in Poland during the 1950s read the book from the prism of Marxist analysis, Żeromski is clear in his stance about the revolution. Even though the main character throughout the entire novel is firm in his stance that the oppressed must be uplifted from their suffering, he rejects revolution as a means of achieving that. The revolution leads to mismanagement of labour, human cruelty, food shortages, all of which later serve as fertile ground for violence motivated by racial hatred. As he grows to love his mother, forced to do labour at old age, later stripped of her wedding-ring upon her death – Cezary rejects the foundation of dialectical-materialist thinkers, which he thinks is to achieve freedom through armed conflict.
