= Agabala Guliyev's House =

The building of Union of Architects of Azerbaijan
- Agabala Guliyev's House
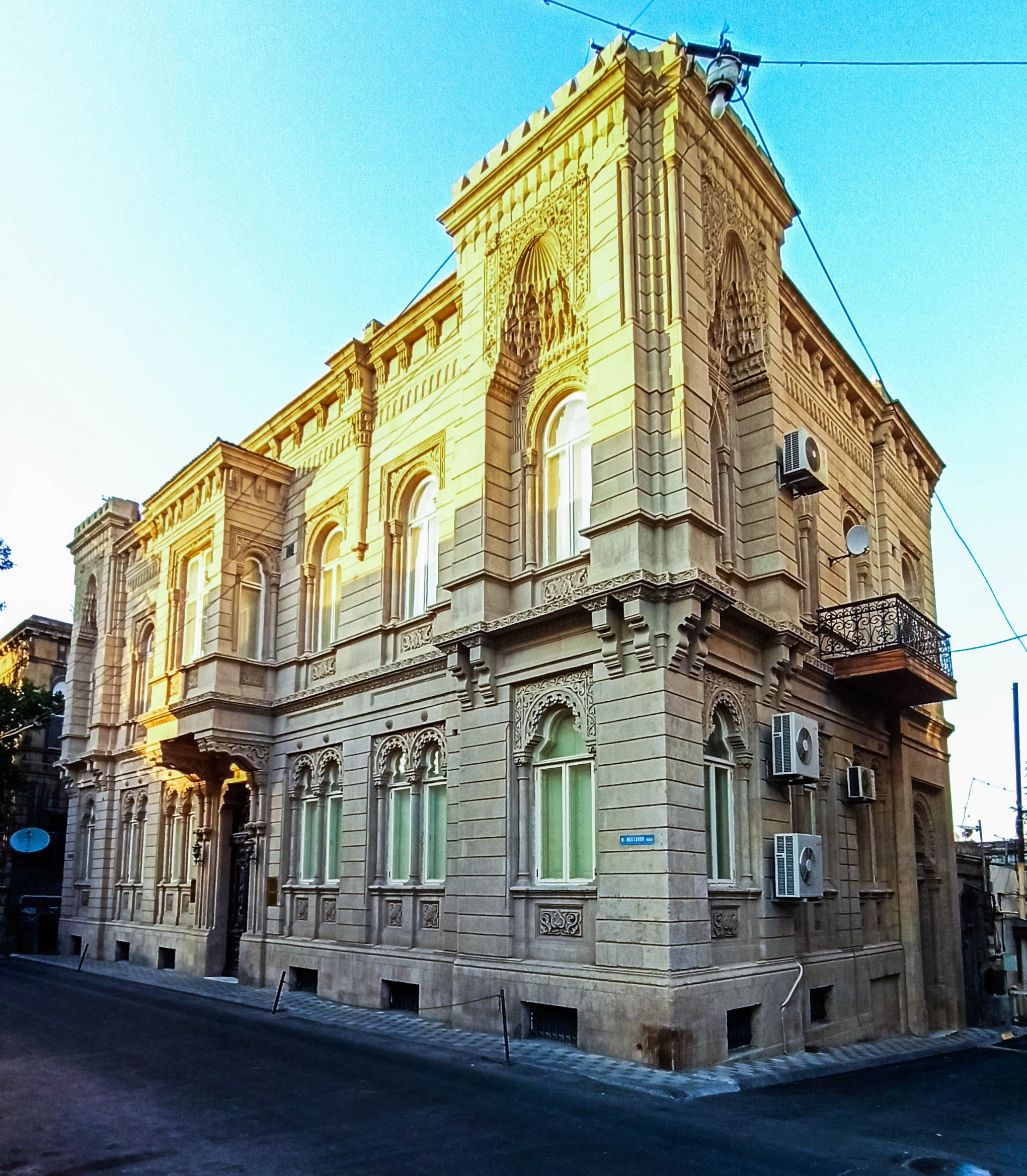
- Interactive map of the The building of Union of Architects of Azerbaijan area

General information
- Architectural style: National Romantic
- Location: Murtuza Mukhtarov st. 24, Baku, Azerbaijan
- Coordinates: 40.3744°N 49.8302°E
- Construction started: 1899
- Client: Agabala Guliyev
- Owner: Union Architects of Azerbaijan

Design and construction
- Architect: Eugeniusz Skibinski

Agabala Guliyev's house is the former home of Azerbaijani oil billionaire Agabala Guliyev, designed by the Polish architect Eugeniusz Skibinski. It impacted the national-romantic movement of architecture in Baku. The architecture of the building has many advantages thanks to its three-dimensional façade, despite the fact that the building was built in narrow streets. Figarov-Fatullayev notes that under the influence of this house, in 1898-1901, Nikolayevskaya (now Istiglaliyyat) street. The building of the Girls School of H.Z.Taghiyev was built on the basis of V. Qoslavsky's project. The building is considered to be of the best examples of Azerbaijan's national architecture, with the importance of Skibinsky's creativity.

== History ==
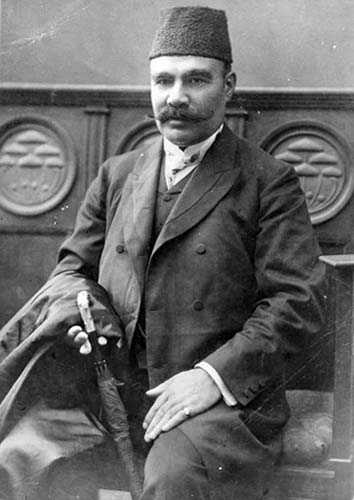
Agabala Guliyev

At the end of the nineteenth century, almost all city neighborhoods had been built in the center of Baku. A stylistic trend was formed incorporating different varieties of European architecture, and eclectic environments had begun to be flavored with modernity.

The first period of architectural development in Baku was about to end; in the new socio-economic conditions, the national-romantic direction opened itself to revival.

Agabala Guliyev was one of the monarchs of Baku who often traveled to Western Europe. He decided to build a house in the traditions of local architecture. He owned several properties in the Icheri Sheher. He was against the European style used in urban buildings, so he hired Skibinsky and ordered him to employ the Shirvanshah's Palace, Middle East and Arabic architecture. As the Shirvanshahs Palace was nearby, Skibinsky acquired photographs of Middle Eastern architecture. This architecture had attracted the attention of European and especially German scholars; albums, trials and other iconographic material were accessible to Skibinski.

Archaeological gate
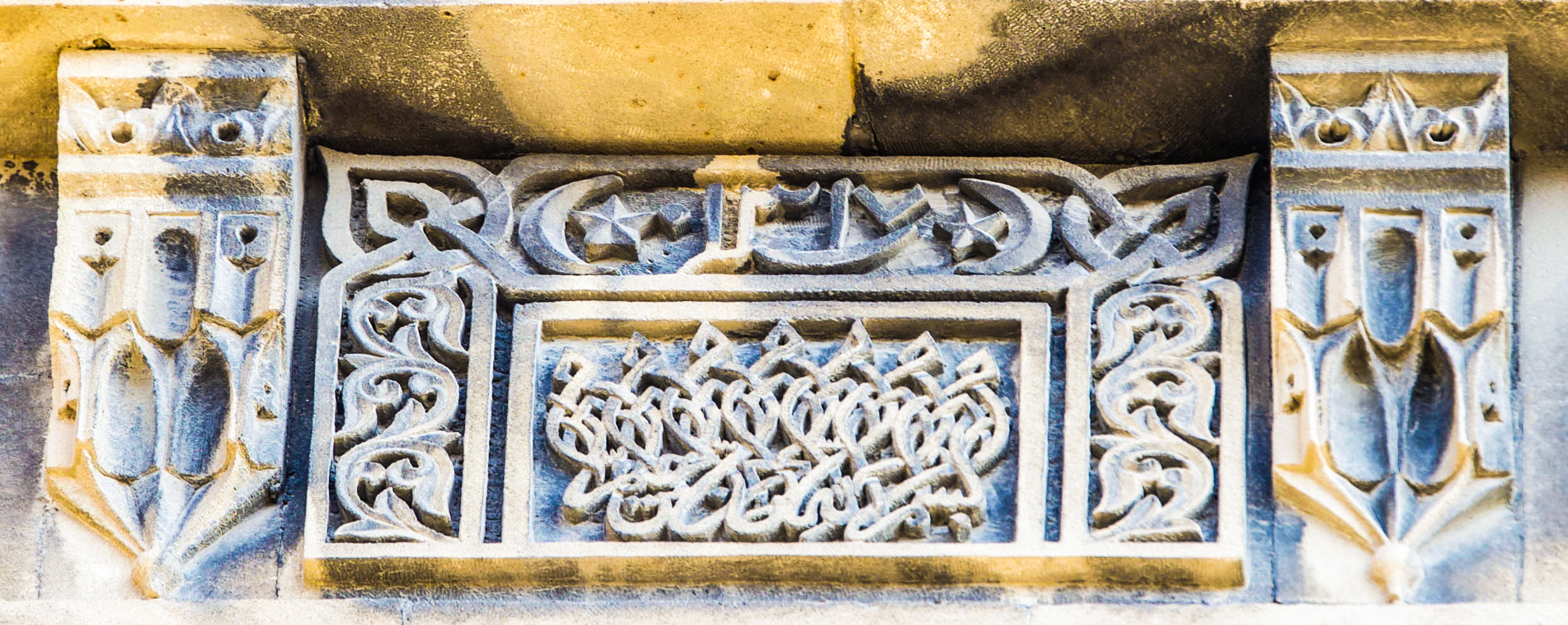
Write a caption here

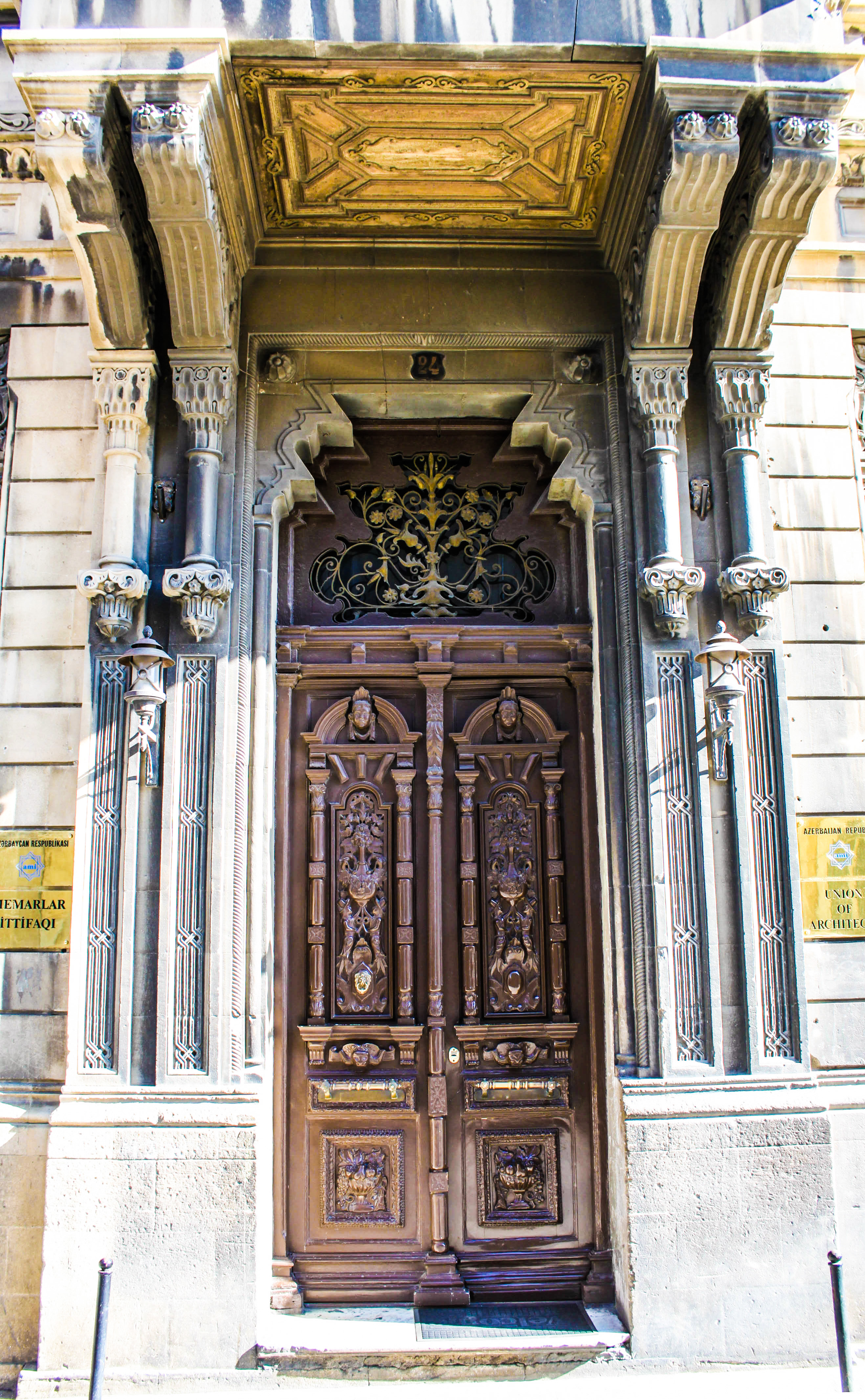
Write a caption here

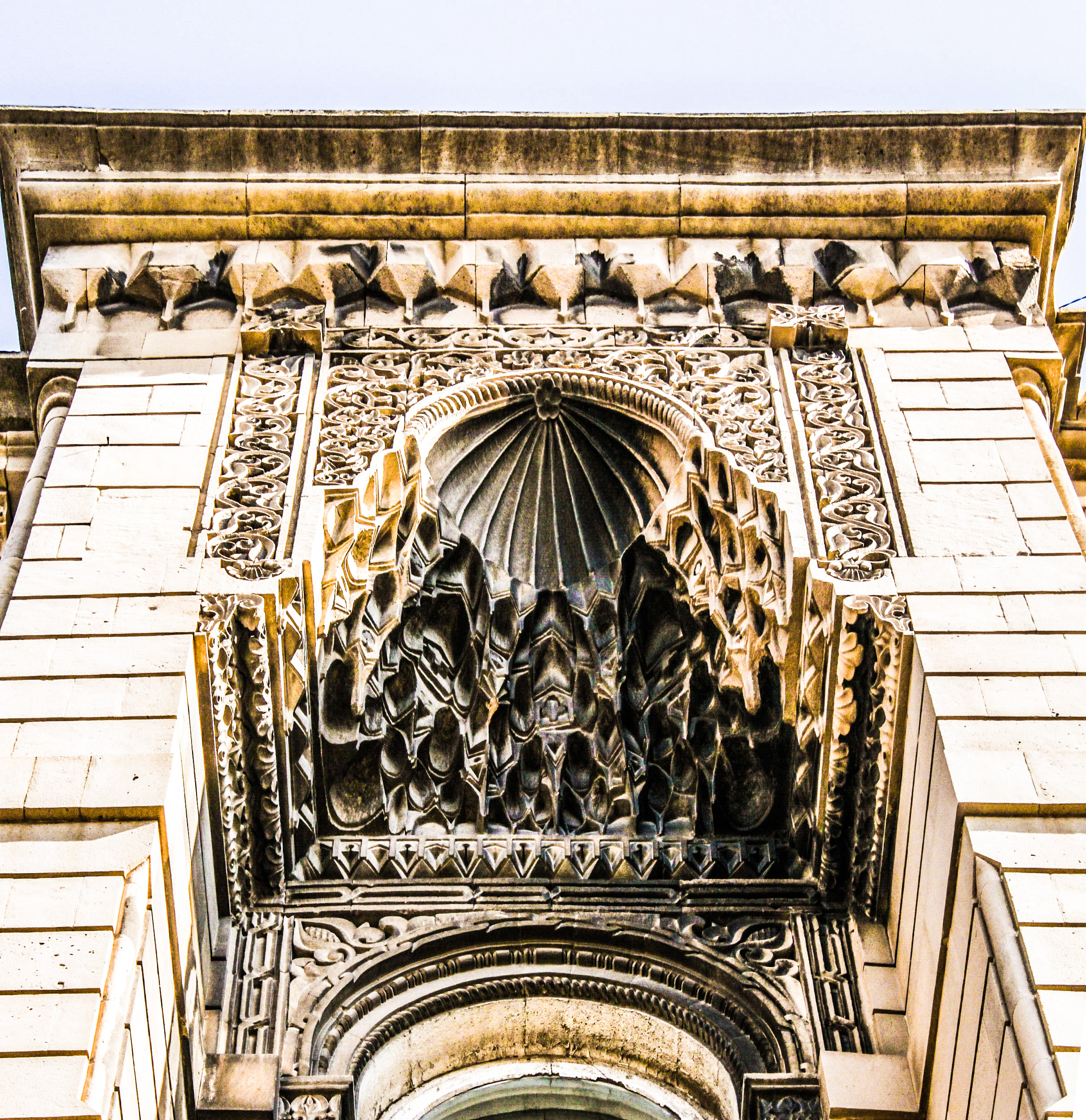
Write a caption here

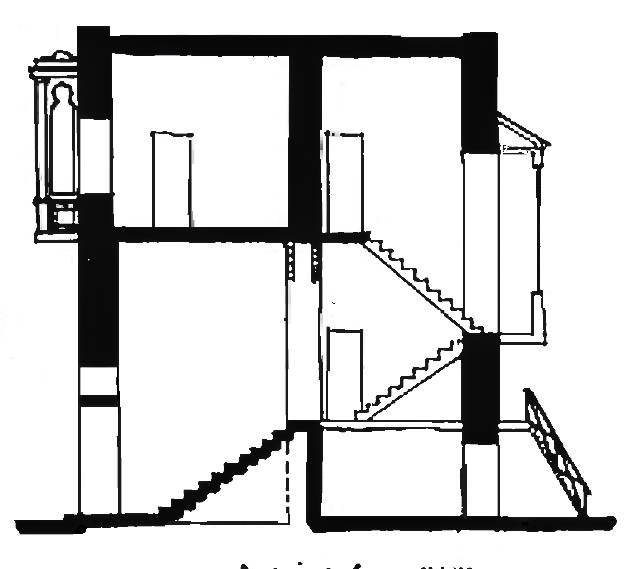
Section of the building
paintings

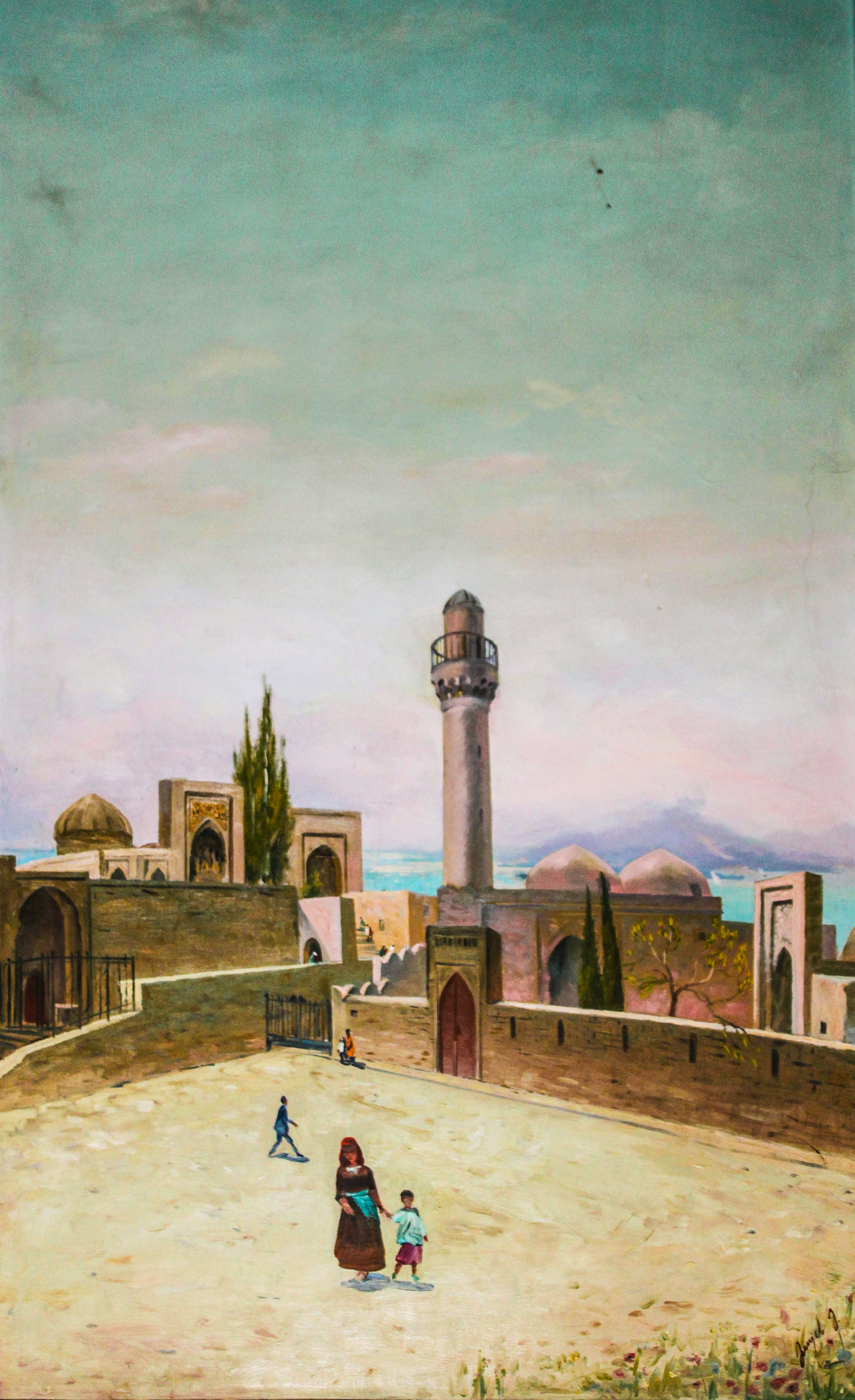

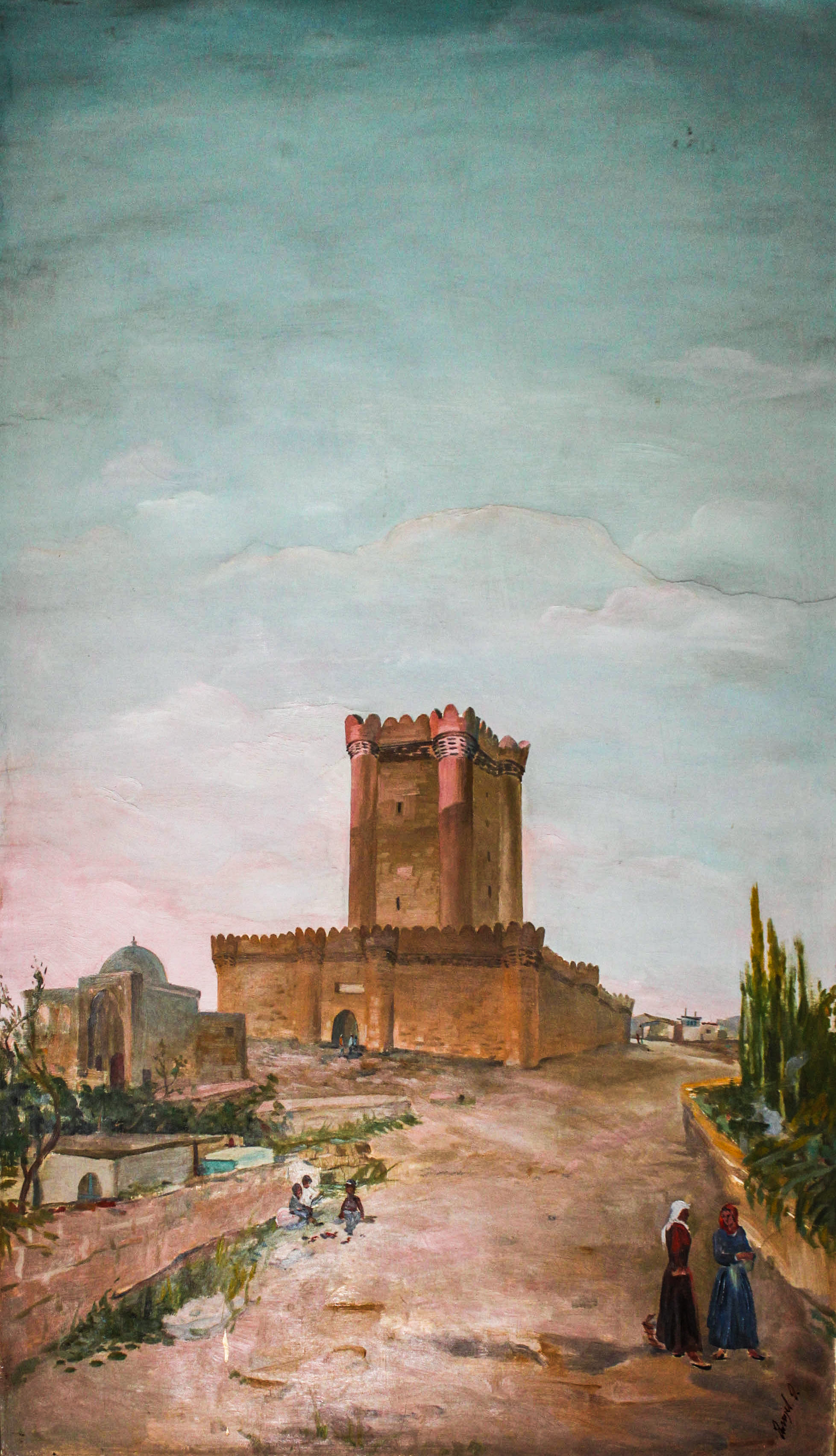

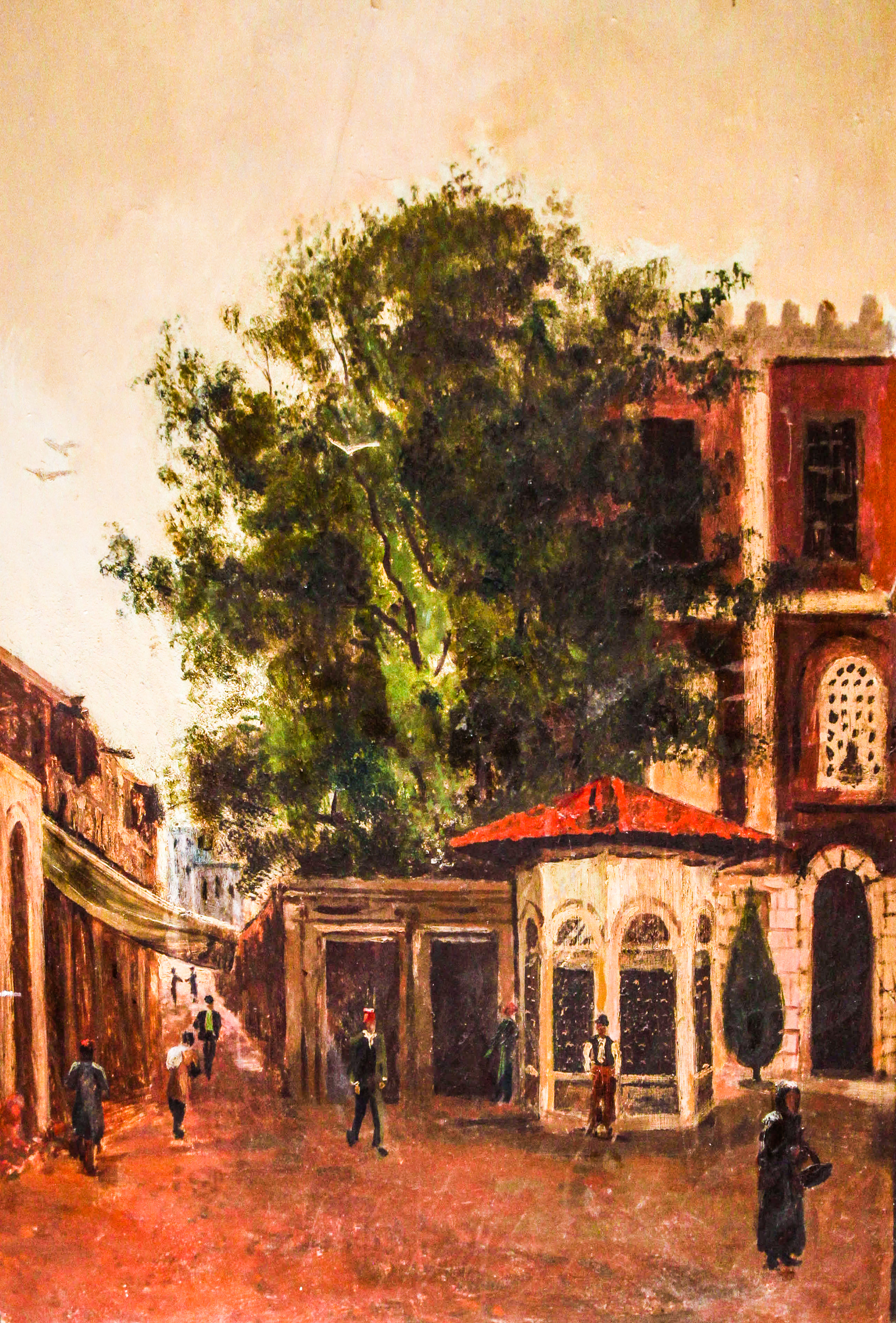

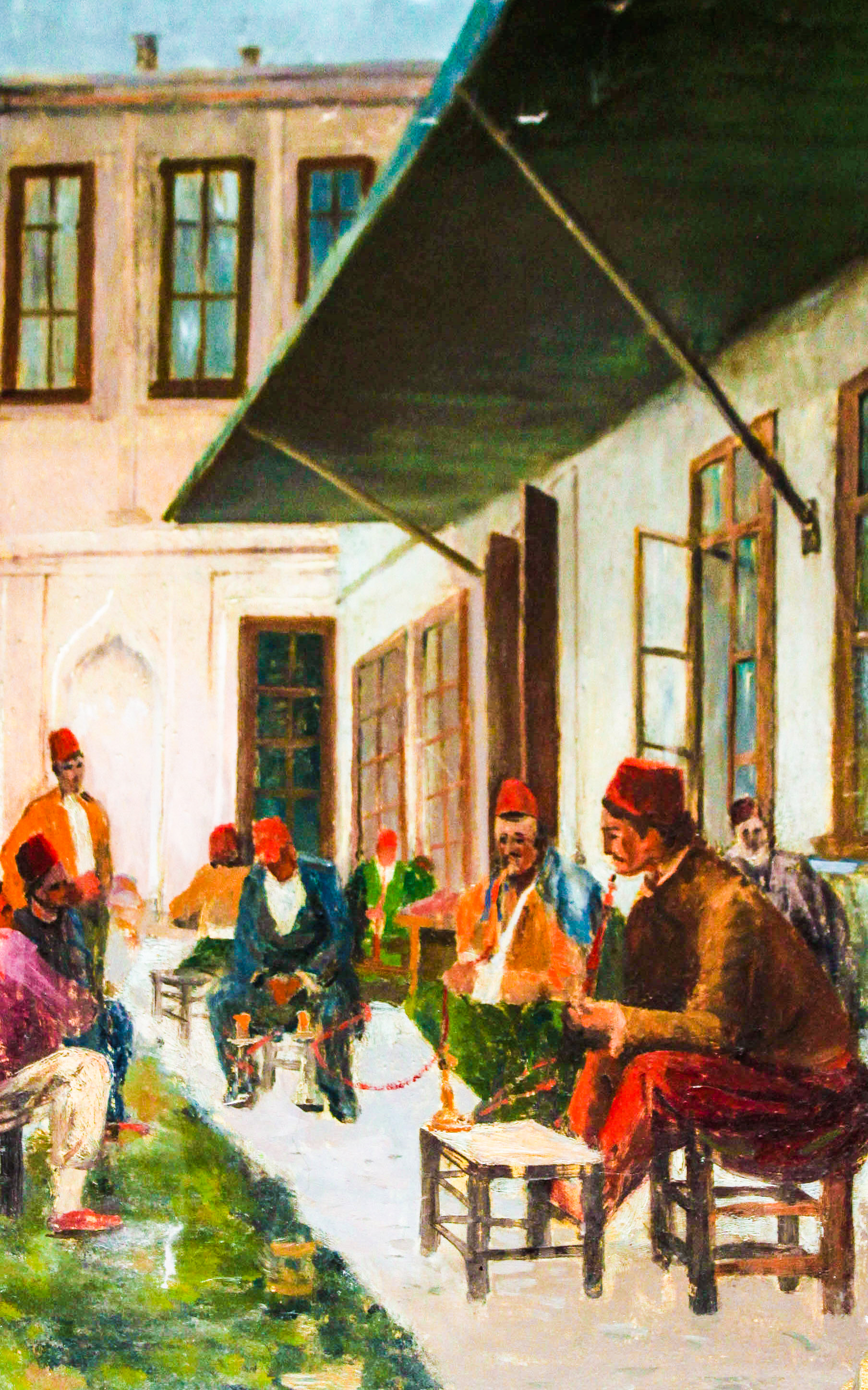

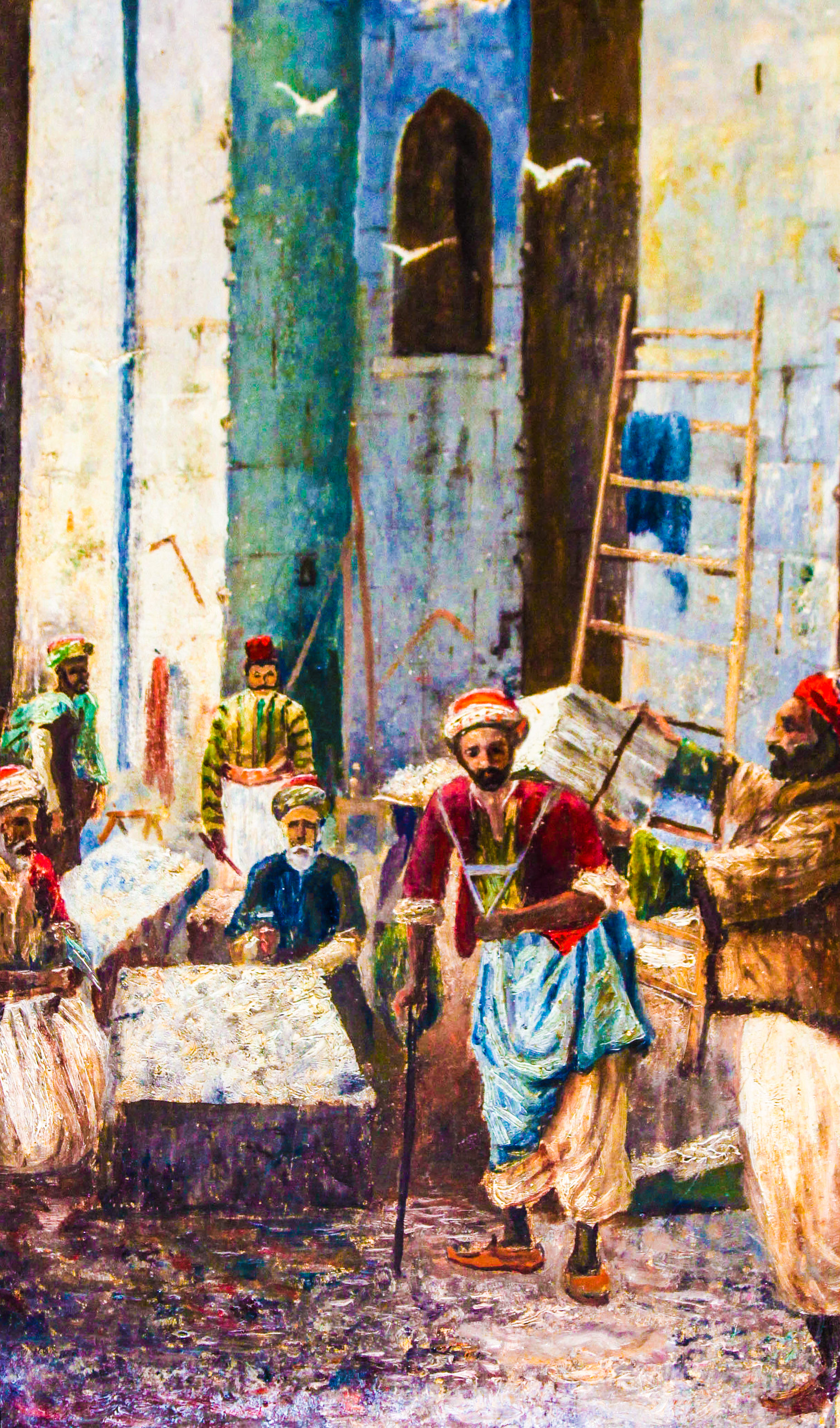

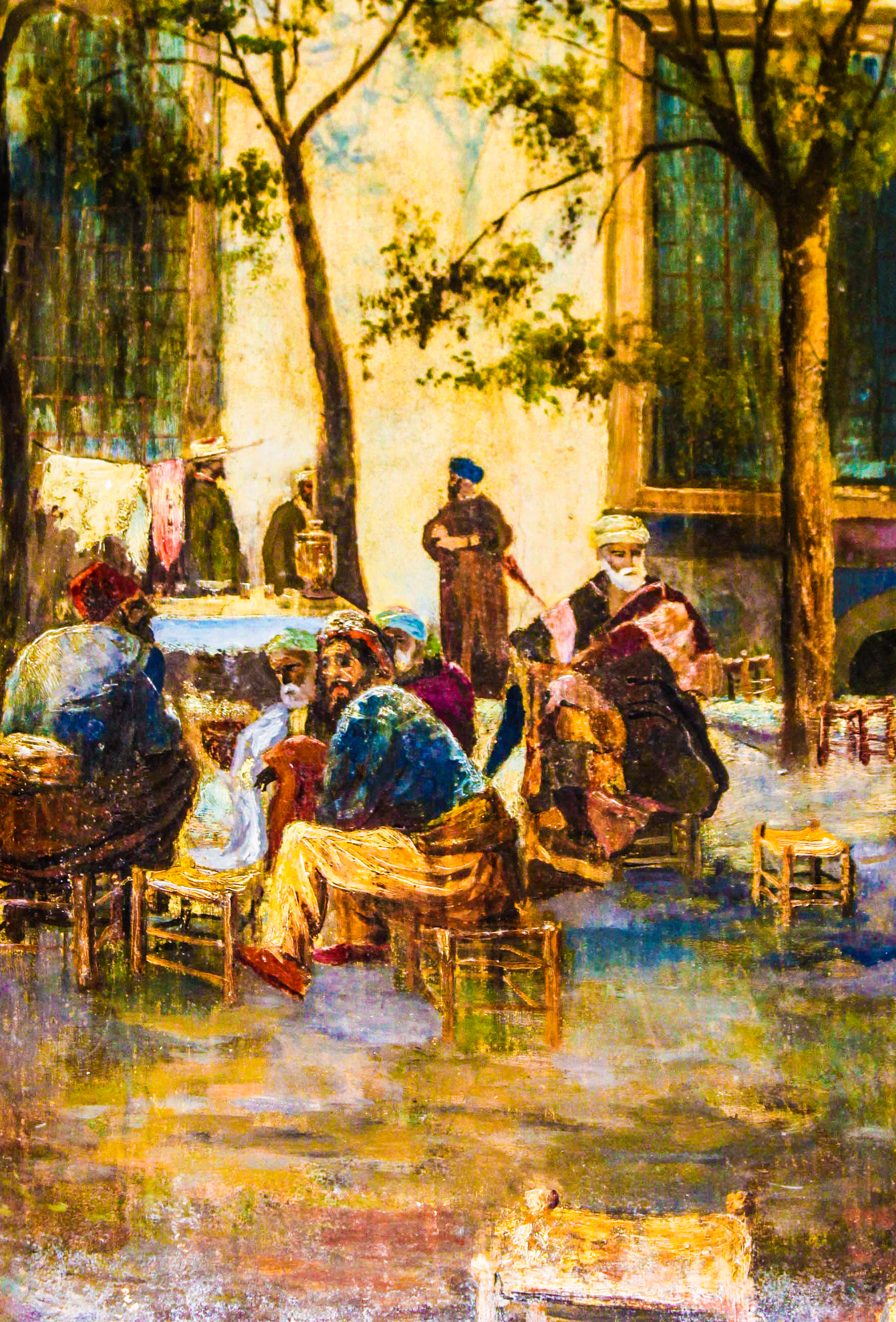
paintings

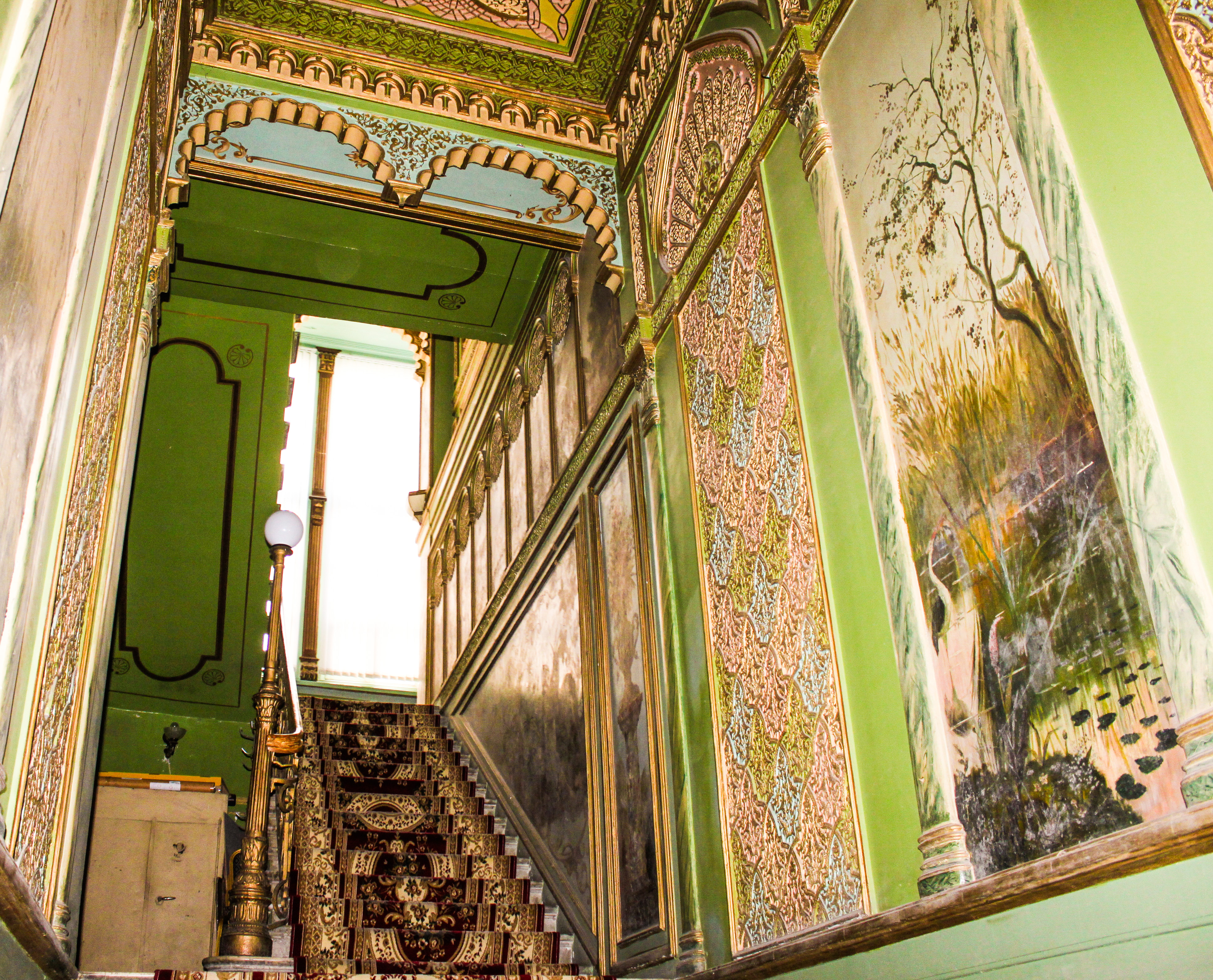

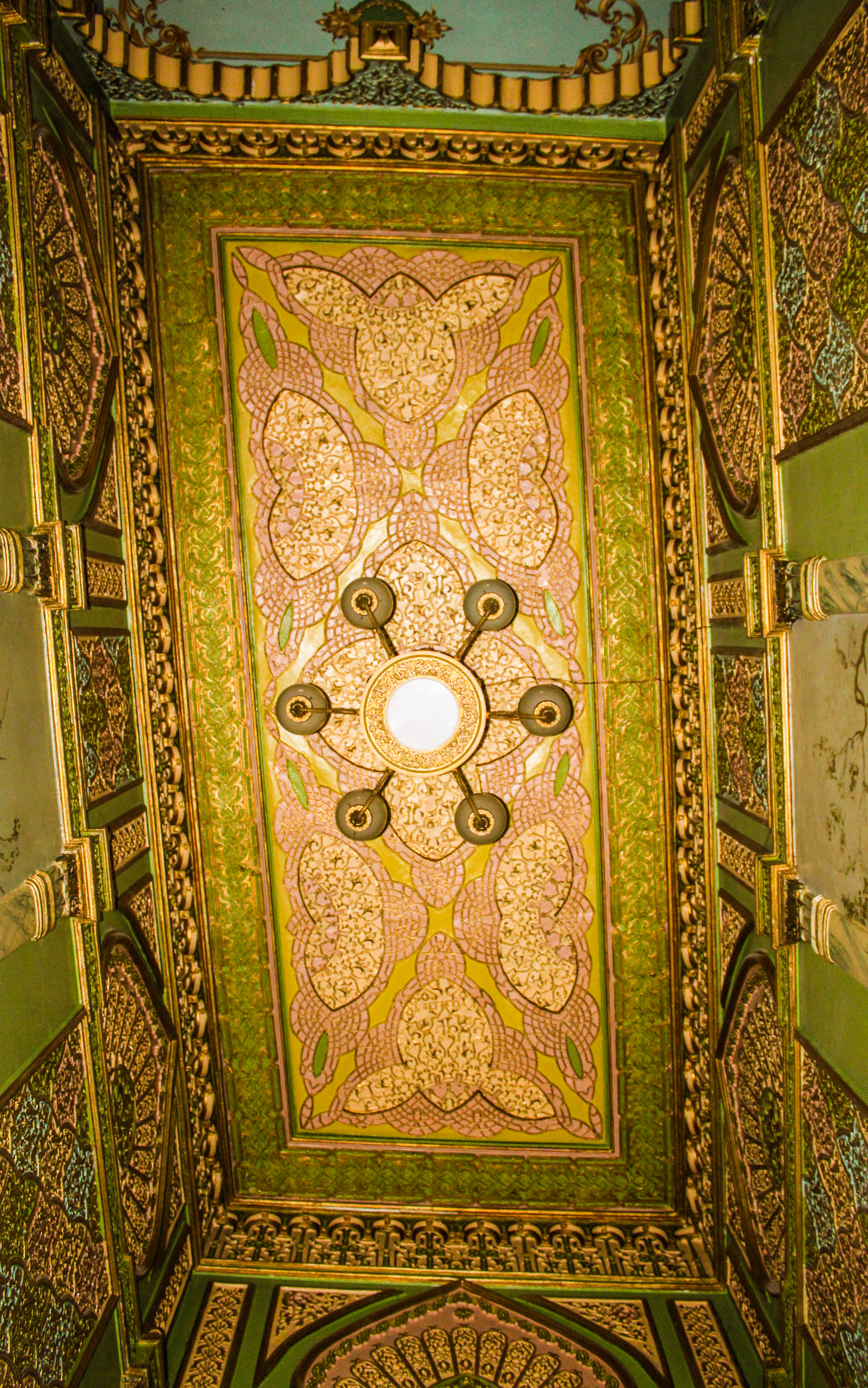

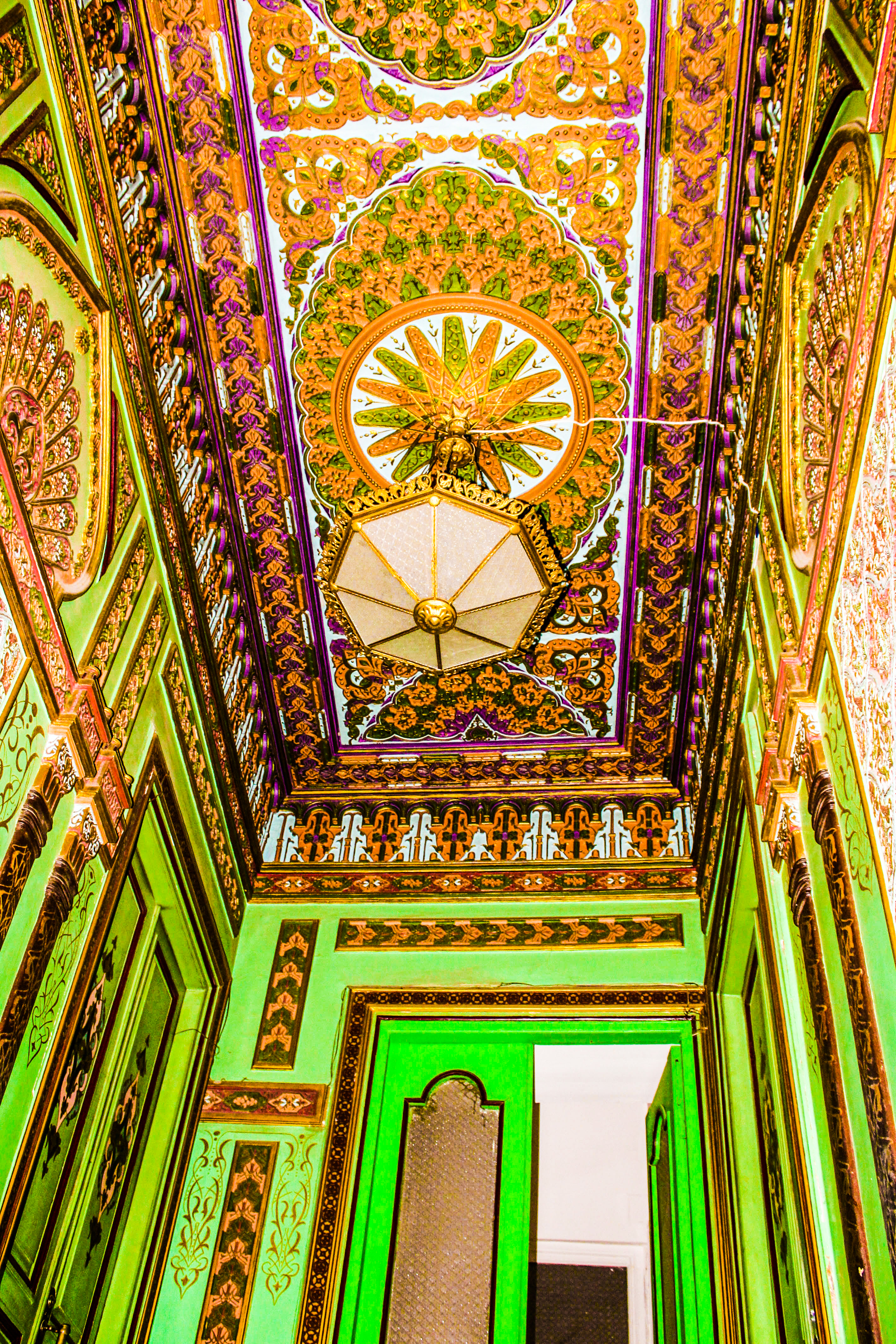

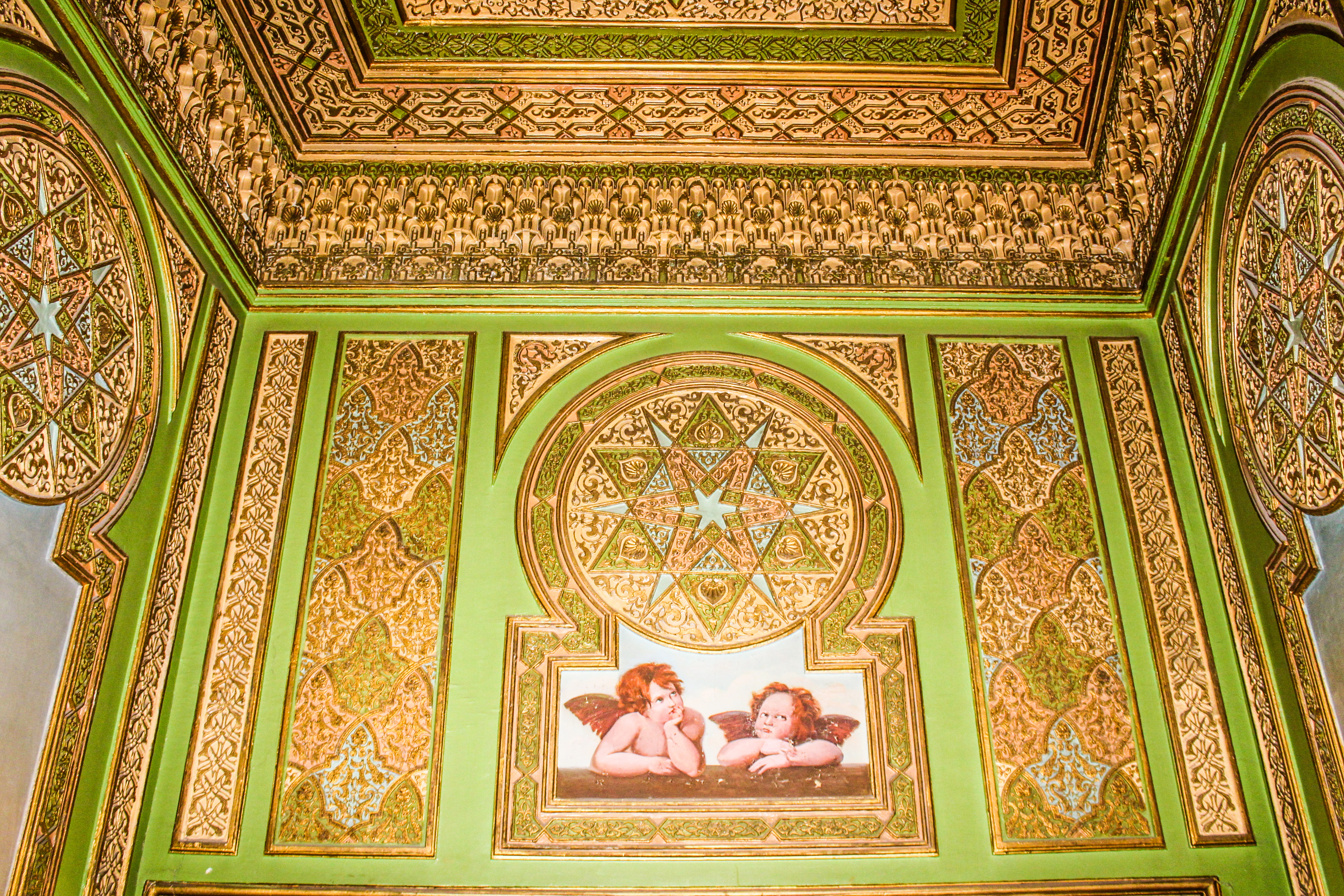

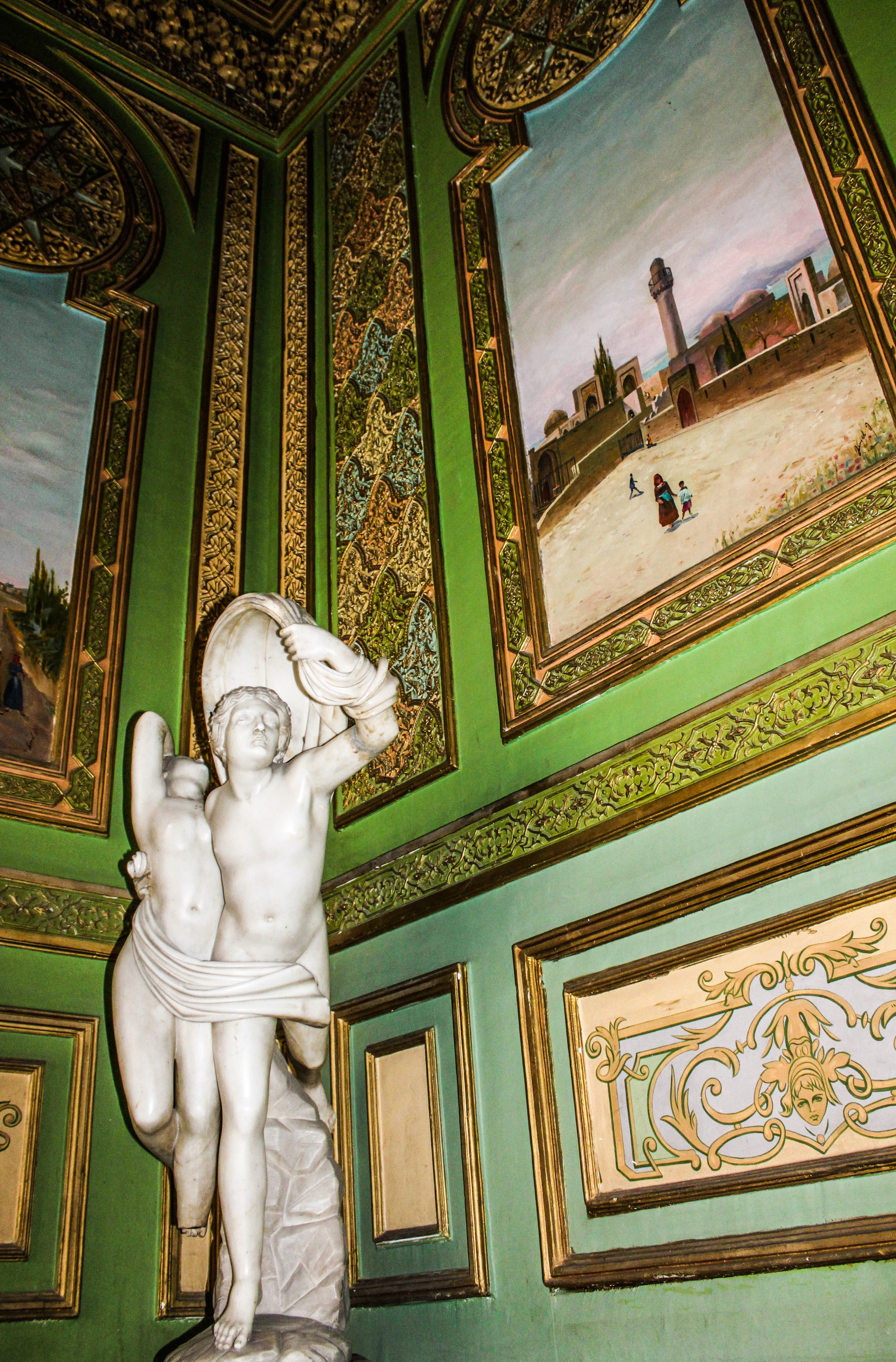
