= Catholic Church in Azerbaijan =

The Catholic Church in Azerbaijan is part of the worldwide Catholic Church, under the spiritual leadership of the Pope in Rome. There were about 570 local Catholics in the country as of 2016 and a similar number in 2025.

Azerbaijan is covered entirely by a single Apostolic Prefecture - Apostolic Prefecture of Baku - since 2011. The community is served by seven Salesian priests and two friars. In addition, there is a mission of the Missionaries of Charity.

== Origins ==
Christians have been present on the territories covered by present-day Azerbaijan since the first century AD. Starting from 1320, Catholic missionaries such as Jordanus and Odoric of Pordenone have visited what is now Azerbaijan and have established missions mostly in large cities. In the fourteenth century in Nakhchivan alone, there were 12 missions led by Dominicans, Capuchins, Augustinians, etc. In 1660 Superior of the Capuchin Mission at Isfahan, friar Raphaël du Mans reported Catholic parishes functioning in Baku and Shamakhi. Jesuits arrived and set a mission in Ganja in the 1680s.

In the fourteenth and fifteenth centuries, efforts of Bartholomew, a Dominican missionary from Bologna, resulted in the conversion of 28 settlements in Nakhchivan (with Bənəniyar being the largest) into Catholicism. Despite hardships and pressure from the Armenian Apostolic Church, Catholicism survived here for over three centuries, after which it went into decline and by the 1800s was no longer practiced.

== Russian and Soviet period ==
With the establishment of the Russian rule in the nineteenth century, these lands became a popular destination for members of various Christian denominations. Catholics were represented by ethnic Poles who started immigrating to Baku and Shamakhi in the mid-19th century, Ukrainians, Georgian Catholics, Armenian Catholics, as well as Western Europeans who stayed in Baku on a temporary or permanent basis. The Catholic population of Shamakhi just before the 1859 earthquake and the city's loss of provincial capital status numbered around 250 persons.

The village of Siyaqut in Nakhchivan was founded in the 1850s by Assyrian immigrants from Salmas, Persia and remained the only Chaldean Catholic village in the South Caucasus. Beginning in the 1880s, the priest serving in Siyaqut was ordained by the Catholic bishop.

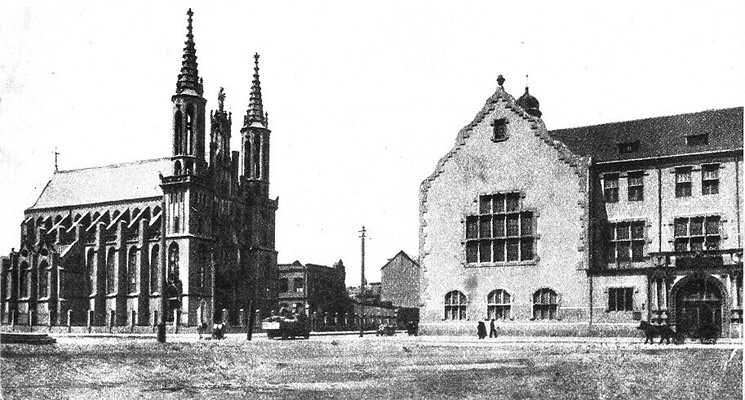
Church of Immaculate Conception (left) before 1917

In the early twentieth century there was a community in Baku made up of Polish, German, and Russian immigrants for whose needs the Church of the Immaculate Conception of the Blessed Virgin Mary was built in 1912. Two other smaller churches were built throughout the second half of the nineteenth century: in Qusar, where a hussar regiment made up of ethnic Poles had been quartered, and in Zagatala where participants of the 1863 January Uprising had been exiled. In 1916, the number of Catholic church mass attendees in Baku was over 2,500. The arrival of Bolsheviks in 1920 put an end to religious freedoms. In the early 1930s, on the orders of the Stalinist government, the small community's only priest Stefan Demurov was executed. In 1931, the communist authorities demolished the church in Baku. The church in Qusar fell in disuse after the transfer of the hussar regiment in 1918, as few Poles remained in the town. Its building is currently used as an art gallery. The church in Zagatala is now private property.

== Post-Soviet period ==
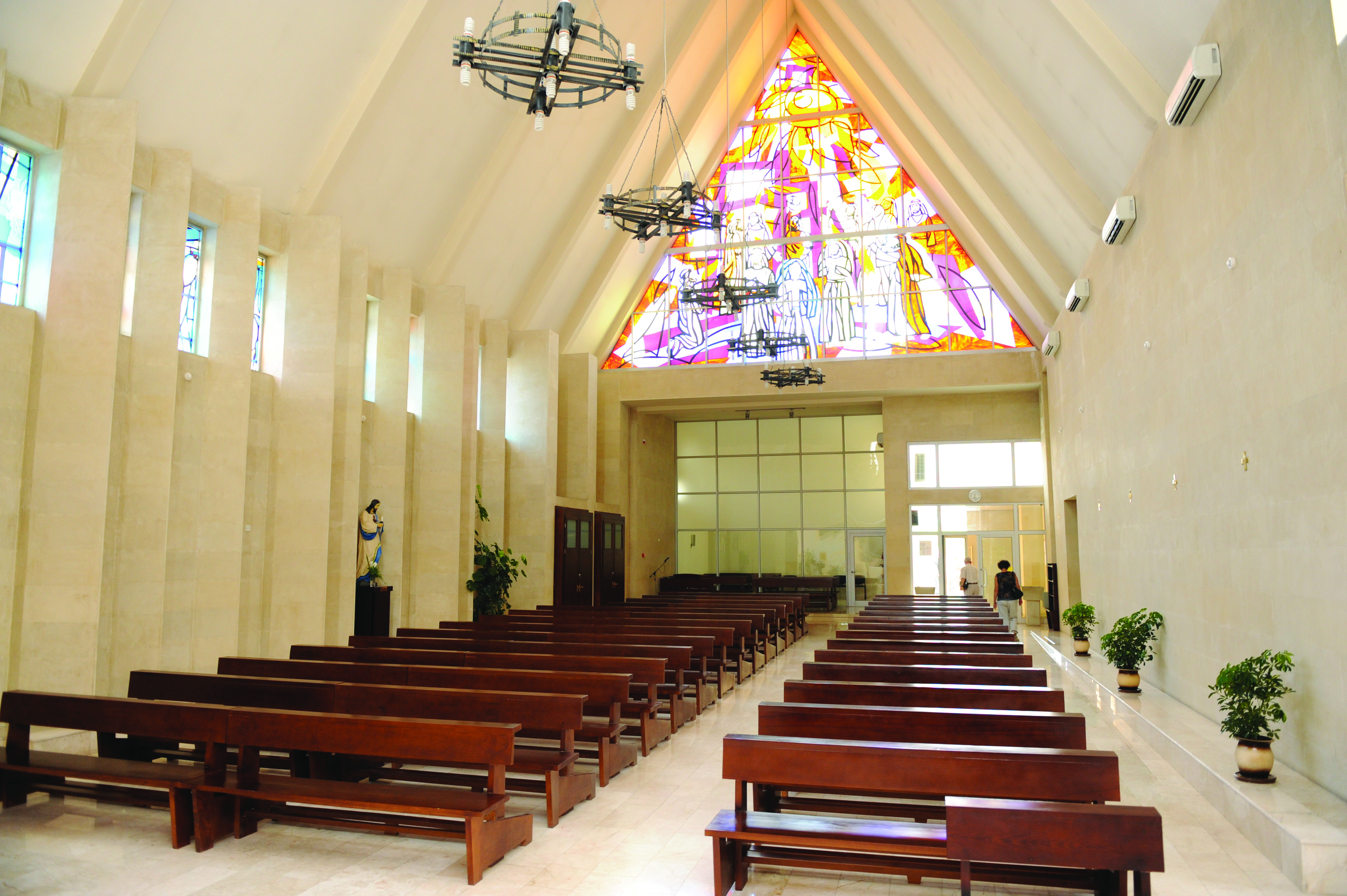
Church of the Immaculate Conception of Baku

As Azerbaijan is a secular country the 1996 law stated that foreigners have freedom of conscience, but denied the right to "carry out religious propaganda", i.e., to preach, under the threat of fines or deportation. Rafig Aliyev, head of the State Committee for Work with Religious Organisations, had declared that this ban for the foreigners to conduct religious work will be amended. The 1992 law of the Republic of Azerbaijan "On Freedom of Faith" guarantees every individual the right to determine and express their views on religion and to exercise this right.

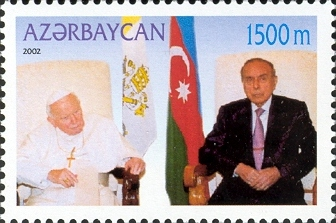
Pope John Paul II visited Azerbaijan in 2002

In 1997, a Slovak priest came to Baku to restart the Catholic community. On 11 October 2000, the mission sui iuris of Baku was established covering the whole of the country, with Daniel Pravda as its first superior. Pravda had worked in Siberia for many years when he became head of the mission, and noted that when he was first appointed, the church had no structure, and there were many problems with the government relating to visas, but when a new Religious affairs official was appointed, problems abated and preparations for a Papal visit gained traction. On May 23, 2002, Pope John Paul II visited the country, despite his increasingly fragile health. He was initially invited by Azerbaijan's president, Heydar Aliyev. Thanks to his visit, President Aliyev gave the Catholic Church a plot of land to build a church. The building was funded by proceeds from Pope John Paul II's book sales and foreign donations. Delegates from Azerbaijan attended the first Congress of Catholic Laity of Eastern Europe in 2003. When Archbishop Claudio Gugerotti, the apostolic nuncio to Azerbaijan, visited the country he encountered many elderly believers who had waited almost 70 years to receive the sacrament of confirmation. St Mary's Catholic Church of Baku, the only Catholic church in the country, was rebuilt, with work nearing its end in March 2007. It was inaugurated by Cardinal Secretary of State Tarcisio Bertone on 7 March 2008, 70 years after it had been shut down by the Soviets. The Mission of Baku became on 4 August 2011 the Apostolic Prefecture of Azerbaijan, with a Catholic population of 520. The Apostolic Prefect is Bishop Vladimir Fekete, a Slovak like his fellow Salesian predecessors Jozef Pravda and Jan Čapla. Only a few of the Catholics are Azeris, and the congregation's working languages are Russian and English. On April 29, 2011, an accord was reached between the Vatican and the government of Azerbaijan concerning the relations of the two states, and the various rights and freedoms of the Catholic Church and its personnel within the country, with Azerbaijan establishing an embassy to the Vatican in 2021.

In 2012, Azerbaijan became the first Muslim-majority country to take part in a Vatican-run heritage project, funding conservation works at the Catacombs of Commodilla, among others.

In 2016, Behbud Mustafayev was ordained the first Catholic deacon of Azeri origin by archbishop Paolo Pezzi. On 7 May 2017, he was ordained into priesthood by Pope Francis.

In October 2016, Pope Francis visited Azerbaijan on what was the second papal visit in the country's history during which he emphasised Azerbaijan's embrace of religious diversity.

In 2024, Archbishop Paul Gallagher, the Vatican's Secretary for Relations with States and International Organisations, visited Azerbaijan to lay the foundation stone of a new Catholic church in Baku.

== See also ==
- Catholic Church by country
- Christ the Redeemer Parish
- Christianity in Azerbaijan
- Religion in Azerbaijan
