= Behbud Mustafayev =

Azerbaijani Catholic priest

Personal life
- Born: 13 March 1982 (age 44) Azerbaijan SSR, Soviet Union

Religious life
- Religion: Roman Catholic Church
- Ordination: May 7, 2017

Military service
- Rank: Priest

Behbud Mustafayev (born March 13, 1982, Baku, Azerbaijan SSR, USSR) is the first Azerbaijani Catholic priest in the history of the Roman Catholic Church.

== Life ==
He graduated from the secondary school at the Azerbaijan National Aviation Academy and after that worked as an officer of the Customs Committee of the Republic of Azerbaijan. In 2008, Mustafayev converted to Roman Catholicism and was baptized in Church of the Immaculate Conception in Baku. In 2011, he entered in the seminary Mary Queen of the Apostles in Saint Petersburg.

On May 29, 2016, in the Cathedral of the Assumption of the Blessed Virgin Mary in St. Petersburg, his ordination to deacon was held to serve in the apostolic prefecture of Azerbaijan. His ordination was performed by the Archbishop of the Archdiocese of the Mother of God, Paolo Pezzi On May 7, 2017, Pope Francis in St. Peter's Basilica ordained Behbud Mustafayev to the priesthood.
