= Christ the Redeemer Church =

Christ the Redeemer Church may refer to:

- Christ the Redeemer Church, Valletta, a Franciscan Catholic church.
- Christ the Redeemer Church (Spokane, Washington), an independent evangelical Protestant church

== See also ==
- Christ the Redeemer (disambiguation)
