= Christ the Redeemer =

Christ the Redeemer, a reference to Jesus Christ as the Redeemer of humanity, may refer to:

== Sculpture ==
- Christ the Redeemer (statue), Rio de Janeiro, Brazil
- Christ of Vũng Tàu, in Vũng Tàu, Vietnam
- Christ the Redeemer of the Andes, on the Argentine-Chilean border
- Cristo della Minerva by Michelangelo, in Rome
- Cristo Redentore sculpture in Maratea, Italy
- Christ the King Statue in Świebodzin, Poland
- Monument du Galtz in France

== Other uses ==
- Redeemer (Christianity), the theological concept of Jesus as redeemer
- Christ the Redeemer (icon), a 15th-century Russian icon
- Christ the Redeemer (Mantegna), a 1493 painting by Andrea Mantegna
- Christ the Redeemer Parish, in Azerbaijan
- Cristo Redentor (album), a 1968 album by Harvey Mandel
- "Cristo Redentor", a song on Charlie Musselwhite's 1967 album Stand Back! Here Comes Charley Musselwhite's Southside Band
  - Covered by David Sanborn on the 2003 album Time Again
- Paso Internacional Los Libertadores, a mountain pass in the Andes also known as Cristo Redentor

== See also ==
- Christ the Redeemer Church (disambiguation)
