= House with Atlanteans =

- Interactive map of the House with Atlanteans area

General information
- Location: 16, Yusif Mammadaliyev Street, Baku Azerbaijan
- Coordinates: 40°22′14″N 49°50′23″E
- Completed: 1900
- Demolished: 2010

Design and construction
- Architect: Józef Płoszko

House with Atlanteans was uilt in 1900 on the basis of the project by the architect Józef Płoszko, located in 16, Yusif Mammadaliyev Street, Baku. According to the decree of the Cabinet of Ministers of the Republic of Azerbaijan, Azerbaijan has been proclaimed it a historical and cultural monument of local significance.

== History ==
The house in the street of the Police (formerly the street of Yusif Mammadaliyev) was built in 1900 in the Baroque style by the architect Józef Płoszko. One of the balconies of the building was supported by the sculptures of the Atlanteans, therefore the building was known as the "House with Atlanteans".

=== Dismantling ===
In 2004, information appeared that the building was going to be demolished. In 2008, the residents of the house were evicted. The reason for the eviction was called the restoration of the building. In early 2010, the House with Atlanteans was dismantled.
