= Waste to Wonder Park =

- Taj Mahal at Waste of Wonder Park
- Interactive map of Waste to Wonder Park
- Type: Theme Park
- Location: Rajiv Gandhi Smriti Van, near Sarai Kale Khan, Delhi
- Coordinates: 28.592906°N 77.256924°E
- Created: 2019
- Opened: 22 February 2019
- Founder: South Delhi Municipal Corporation
- Status: Open

Waste to Wonder Park in Delhi features Replicas of 7 Wonders of the World and Dinosaur. It was built by the South Delhi Municipal Corporation in Sarai Kaale Khan area, Delhi. It was inaugurated by Defence Minister Rajnath Singh.

Rajnath Singh at Inauguration of Waste to Wonder Park

== Inspiration for park ==
Puneet Goel, the South Delhi Municipal Corporation commissioner, got the inspiration for the park from a Dharma Productions film, Badrinath Ki Dulhania. According to NDTV, Puneet Goel, wrote:

Through the movie Badrinath ki Dulhniya, I got to know Kota in Rajasthan has seven wonders park comprising miniatures of Seven Wonders of the World. While watching movie I thought why not build a similar one in Delhi? Initially we thought of constructing replicas using bricks but then we thought why not use scrap material just like we did to build 30 sculptures like Qutub Minar, Lotus Temple as part of ‘Waste to art’ programme and installed in various parts of Delhi like T3, Dwarka. One thing led to another and gave shape to this park.

Five artists, seven supporting artists and 50 labourers from across the country, came together. Using close to 80 tonnes of waste, facsimile of wonders of the world were created in around six months.

== Replicas ==
This park has replicas of 7 wonders of the World and Dinosaurs.Following are the monuments:

- Taj Mahal
- Statue of Liberty
- Great Pyramid of Giza
- Eiffel Tower
- Colosseum
- Christ the Redeemer
- Leaning Tower of Pisa
- Dinosaur

== Material Used ==
All replicas are made using scrap automobile parts, metal sheets, railings, chains, old appliances, and other industrial waste.

== Gallery ==
Leaning tower of Pisa.

Dinosaurs at Waste to Wonder Park

The Great Pyramid of Giza

Dinosaur

Eiffel Tower

Statue of Liberty

Christ the Redeemer

Taj Mahal

Colosseum

== See also ==
- Bharat Darshan Park
