= Rylsky brothers' house =

- Azerbaijani: Rılski qardaşlarının yaşayış evi Polish: Dom braci Rylskich
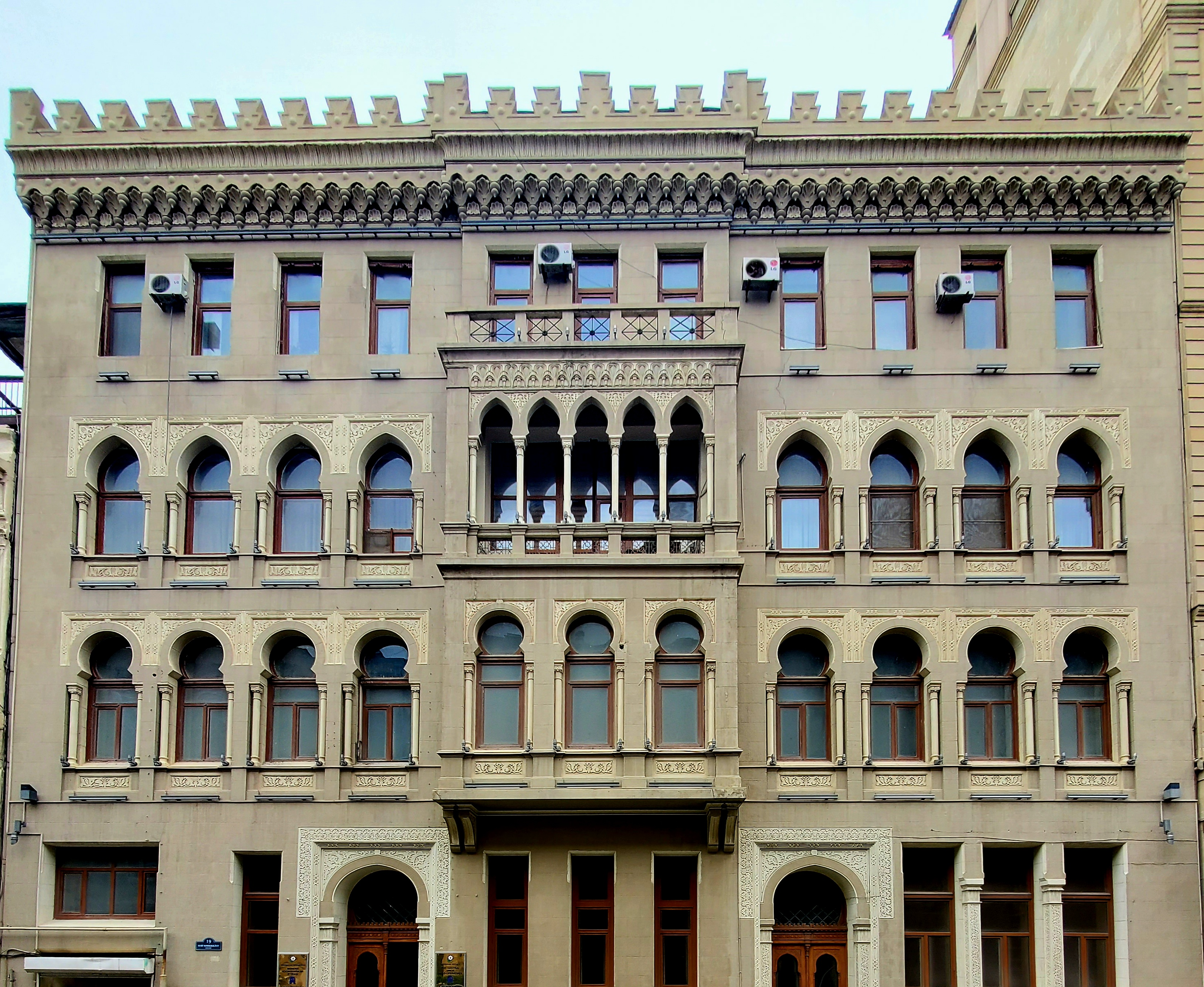
- Interactive map of the Rylsky brothers' house area

General information
- Location: Yusif Mammadaliyev Str. 11, Baku, Azerbaijan
- Completed: 1912

Design and construction
- Architect: Józef Płoszko

Rylsky brothers' house is a building built in Baku in 1912 on the order of Polish oilmen, the Rylsky brothers. This is an edifice established to the design of Polish architect Józef Płoszko at 11 Police Street (nowadays11 Yusif Mamedaliyev Str.). Currently, the Central Union of Cooperatives of Azerbaijan is located in the building. By the Decree of the Cabinet of Ministers of the Republic of Azerbaijan No. 132 dated with 2 August 2001, the edifice is protected by state and is included in the list of architectural monuments.

== History ==
The edifice was built in 1912 by the order of the Rylsky brothers and to the designs of Józef Płoszko at 11 Police Str. (nowadays – 11 Yusif Mammadaliyev Street). The classically symmetrical vertical composition of the facade with soft architectural forms, graceful architraves, and a stalactite cornice with merlons opens up a new page in the usage of the national heritage.

This is a large four-story building with a high plinth and a basement. Ploshko built the facade's architectural composition based on contrasting techniques: along the central symmetrical axis on two middle floors outlined a large-scale bay window of vertical proportions. On the second floor, there is a bay window of a closed type with window openings, on the third floor there is a light openwork arcade on the columns of the Moorish pattern of the loggia.

The architectural composition of the bay window belongs to very interesting motifs evoked by the poetry of the oriental forms with subtle and elegant techniques, demonstrating the possibilities of high artistic aesthetics. Here, the architectural solution of the second floor's bay window is indicative, when the window openings of the arches are placed in vertically flat frames with ornamental motifs, and under the arches there are three-quarter columns with traditional capitals. A slightly pronounced profiled shelf makes the transition to loggia, and the latter is decorated with a stalactite belt that holds the balcony with Roman lattices. On both sides of the bay window there is a rhythm of deep window openings: on the second floor there is a horseshoe-shaped arch, and on the third floor there are lancet arches. The surface of the wall is devoid of tectonics and is given over to shallow niches, being large elements of the facade. In general, an elegant architectural composition was formed and built on Eastern Muslim motifs which retained their positive values as a national romantic direction.

The residential building of the Rylsky brothers is notable for the high artistic quality of the facade's architectural composition made of individual elements, as well as the soft architectural forms of the bay windows, the rhythmic arrangements and shapes of the windows. The almost semicircular arch, framed by a rectangular profiling portal, is dressed up with decorative patterns of geometric shapes. On the surfaces of the wooden doors that have survived to nowadays, the depicted patterns are closed to those on the portal decor. The doors, being the main element of the public buildings' entrance parts, fit into the overall facade's composition. Distinguished by the decorative design and plasticity with the use of a rich arsenal of artistic wood carving, they gave additional expressiveness to the building's exterior. Basically, the doors were installed deaf and were divided into separate constituent elements harmoniously connected with the decor's motifs of the building's entrance stone portal. Sometimes the use of the metal openwork lattice gave additional expressiveness brought to perfection.

In 1919, during the times of the Azerbaijan Democratic Republic, this building housed the first Polish diplomatic mission headed by Stefan Rylsky.

== Literature ==
- Fatullayev, Shamil (2013). Bakı memarları XIX əsrin sonu - XX əsrin əvvəlində / Бакинские архитекторы: конец XIX - начало XX веков (PDF). Baku: Şərq-Qərb. p. 296. ISBN 978-9952-32-020-6. Archived from the original (PDF) on 2021-01-11.
