= Church of the Immaculate Conception, Baku (1912) =

Former Roman Catholic church in Baku, Azerbaijan

Church of the Blessed Virgin Mary's Immaculate Conception
- Azerbaijani: Müqəddəs Bakirə Məryəmin kosteli; Polish: Kościół Niepokalanego Poczęcia Najświętszej Maryi Panny
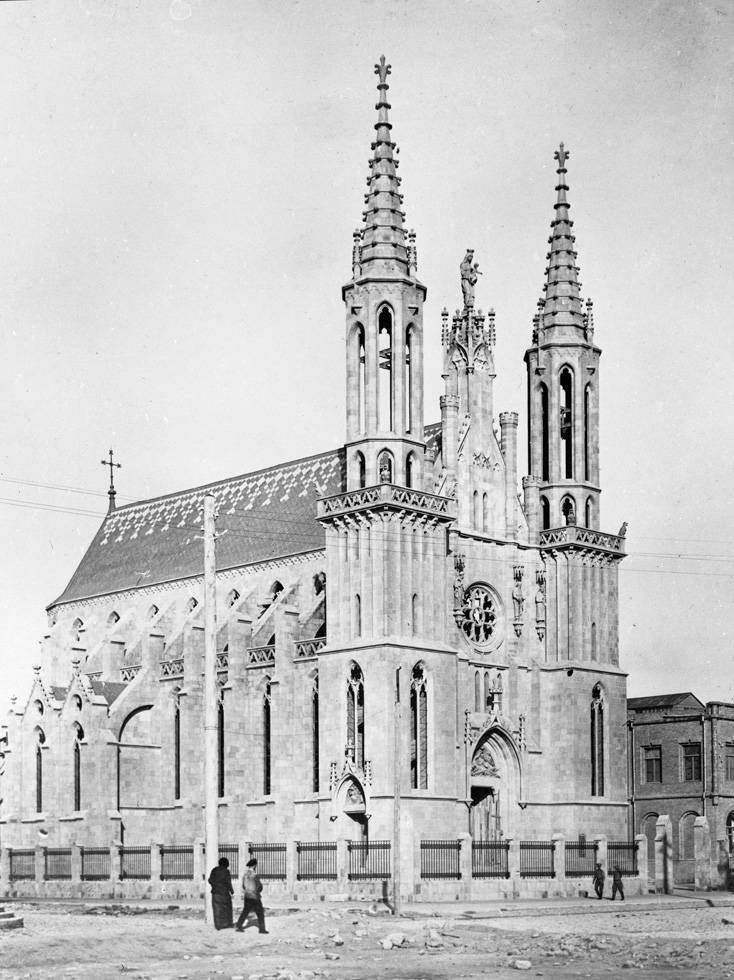
- The former church in 1908, prior to its completion
- Church of the Blessed Virgin Mary's Immaculate Conception
- Location: Baku, Baku Governorate
- Country: Azerbaijan
- Denomination: Roman Catholic (former)

History
- Status: Church (1912–1935)
- Dedication: Virgin Mary
- Consecrated: 27 April 1903

Architecture
- Functional status: Destroyed
- Architect: Józef Płoszko or Józef Pius Dziekoński
- Style: Polish Gothic
- Completed: 1912
- Demolished: 1935

Specifications
- Width: 30 m (98 ft)
- Height: 50 m (160 ft)

The Church of the Blessed Virgin Mary's Immaculate Conception (Azerbaijani: Müqəddəs Bakirə Məryəmin kosteli; Polish: Kościół Niepokalanego Poczęcia Najświętszej Maryi Panny, Russian: Храм Непорочного Зачатия Пресвятой Девы Марии) was a Roman Catholic church built in Baku, in 1912 by Polish architect Józef Płoszko in Baku, Imperial Russia (modern Azerbaijan).

The building was destroyed in 1935.

== History ==
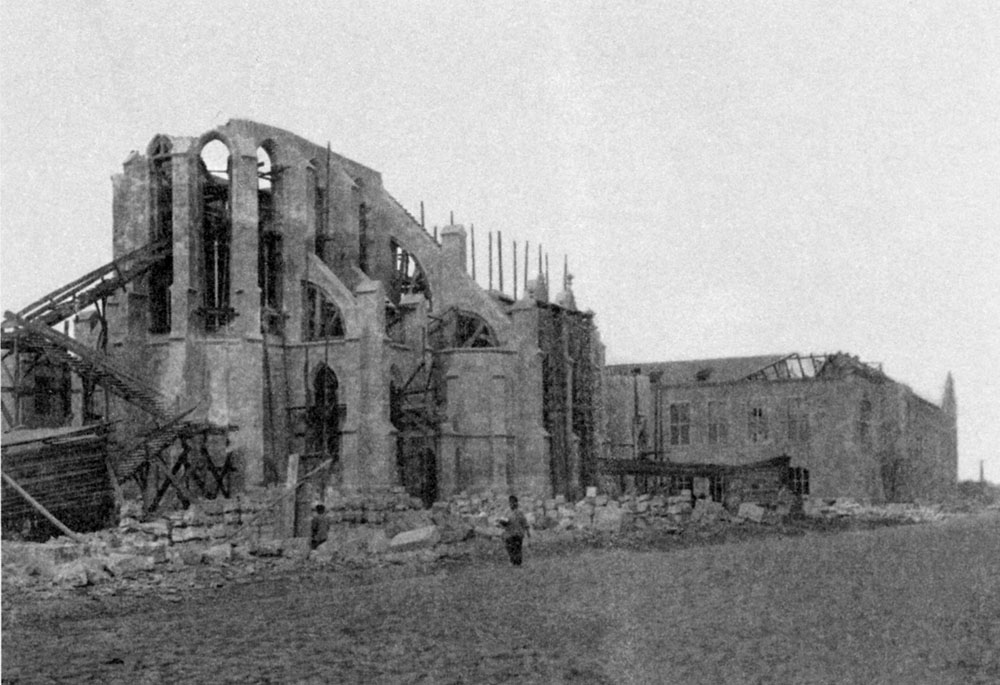
Church of the Blessed Virgin Mary's Immaculate Conception under construction, 1910-1911

Baku's Catholic community, headed by Georg Mayer (1844-1893), requested a plot of land from Baku City Duma to build a church in 1883. However, the lack of funds didn't permit any construction on a sooner date. The allocated plot was later transferred to the Orthodox community, where they built Alexander Nevsky Cathedral of Baku in 1898.

A new plot was given to the Catholic community on 23 December 1891, but plans were delayed again due to the lack of funds. By December 1894, a parish house was built, in which the priest's apartment was located and the chapel of the Immaculate Conception of the Blessed Virgin Mary was built. However, due to the lack of official registration of the parish, the building was considered illegal and confiscated. A cholera epidemic soon followed and plans were delayed yet again.

Georg Mayer died on 30 October 1893, and was replaced by Konrad Keller (b. 1844) who was transferred from Kutaisi to Baku. The Catholic community decided to name the church after the Immaculate Conception later that year. Keller left Baku in 1899 and was replaced by Johann Uselis. In 1899 and 1900, the Catholic community of Baku was headed by ethnic Armenian Gregory Saparov. He was replaced in 1900 by Julian Dobkevičius. The chapel was soon constructed and consecrated by Dobkevičius on 25 March 1901. However, at the end of 1901, priest Dobkevičius left for Tbilisi, to be replaced on 1 December 1901 by a Polish priest, Vladislav Kubik (1859-1902), who had previously served as a military chaplain for nine years. Kubik left for Warsaw in June 1902 to study the architecture of Polish churches to apply to their own future church in Baku. Kubik died unexpectedly in Warsaw in August 1902. He was replaced by Stepan Demurov - an ethnic Armenian Catholic priest from Tbilisi.

Erection of the church began in 1908, and the contractor for the church was a local Azerbaijani businessman, Haji Gasimov. Foundation ceremony was held in 1909. However, building process delayed until 1912 and it was not fully functional until 1915. The church functioned until 1935. Its pastor, Stepan Demurov, was arrested on the night of 13–14 November 1937 on suspicion of espionage in Baku and was sentenced to death on 11 February 1938.

A new Soviet building was erected in its place - Culture Center named after Felix Dzerzhinsky (modern Cultural Center of State Security Service of Azerbaijan).

A new church, also named the Church of the Immaculate Conception, was built in 2006.

== Architecture ==
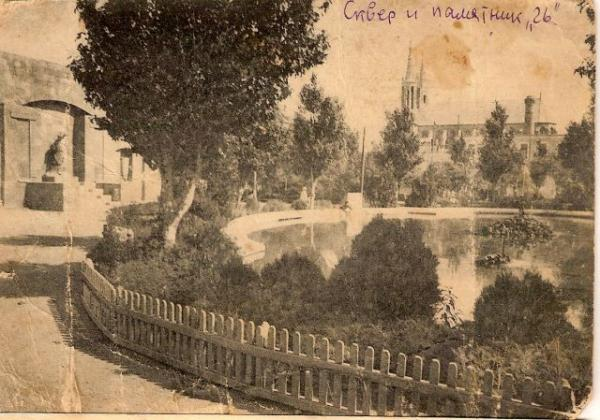
Church as seen in a Soviet postcard, 1920s

The Baku Church of the Blessed Virgin Mary was built in the pseudo-Polish Gothic revival style. Its design differed from the architecture of a number of Gothic cathedrals in Poland. Nevertheless, Płoszko managed to reflect the characteristic features of Polish Gothic in the architecture of the church. It was distinguished from French and English Gothic by the absence of special splendor and richness of decorative forms. However, according to another theory, the design was made by yet another Polish architect – Józef Pius Dziekoński.

The main facade of the church was made in the form of a two-tower composition. The silhouette of the church with faceted, open-type towers, according to architecture historian Shamil Fatullayev, was well-defined. The roofs of the towers were decorated with crockets. In the lower part of the facade of the building, the strict plasticity of the drawing stood out. The facade was complemented by a portal and a rose window, which, as Fatullayev notes, was "appropriately included in the overall composition."

== See also ==
- Roman Catholic Marian churches
- Roman Catholicism in Azerbaijan
