= Bharat Darshan Park =

Theme park in Delhi, India

- Interactive map of Bharat Darshan Park
- Type: Theme Park
- Location: Punjabi Bagh, West Delhi, Delhi, India
- Coordinates: 28.667°N 77.126°E
- Area: 8.5 acres
- Created: 2021
- Opened: 25 December 2021
- Founder: South Delhi Municipal Corporation (SDMC)
- Operator: Municipal Corporation of Delhi
- Status: Open
- Budget: ₹20 crore

Bharat Darshan Park is a theme park located in Punjabi Bagh Xing, West Delhi, India. The park has scaled-down replicas of monuments from different parts of India. It was developed by the South Delhi Municipal Corporation (SDMC) and was inaugurated on 25 December 2021 by Union Home Minister Amit Shah. The park opened to the public in December 2021.

The project was based on the Waste to Wonder Park in South Delhi, which also uses waste material to make replicas of world monuments.

== Concept and development ==
The idea of Bharat Darshan Park was proposed by the South Delhi Municipal Corporation (SDMC) as a second theme park after Waste to Wonder. The objective made by SDMC was to make public space that shows cultural landmarks of India using recycled things.

Construction started in January 2020. According to SDMC officials, more than 350 metric tonnes of scrap including waste automobile parts and other industrial waste were used in the making of replicas.

The park is spread over approximately 8.5 acres in Punjabi Bagh. The total cost was estimated at around Rs 20 Crore.

== Features and monuments ==
The park has replicas of 21 monuments from across India at a scale of approximately 1:8 to 1:20.

The replicas included are:

- Taj Mahal
- Red Fort
- India Gate
- Qutub Minar
- Gateway of India
- Hawa Mahal
- Charminar
- Victoria Memorial
- Mysore Palace
- Konark Sun Temple
- Ruins of Hampi
- Ajanta and Ellora Caves
- Gol Gumbaz
- Sanchi Stupa
- Nalanda University ruins
- Meenakshi Temple
- Char Dham temples

Each structure has a plaque providing the name, location, and brief historical information about the original monument

== Operations and administration ==
The Park is owned by Municipal Corporation of Delhi, SDMC, now under unified Municipal Corporation of Delhi after 2022 merger of three municipal corporations.

== Visitor statistics ==
In the first month after opening, the park recorded approximately 1.5 lakh visitors.

== Phases ==
As of 2026, SDMC and MCD officials have stated that that there is no "Phase 2" announced for Bharat Darshan Park. The original plan included 21 monuments, all of which were installed before the public opening in December 2021.

Maintenance and periodic repainting of the structures are carried out by MCD. In 2023, LED lighting was upgraded in parts of the park to reduce energy consumption

== Reception and criticism ==
Media coverage at the time of launch was largely focused on the use of waste material and the location in West Delhi, an area that previously had less number of theme parks.

Criticism

- Accuracy of replicas: Some heritage experts noted that the scaled-down versions do not show architectural details of the original monuments. The Archaeological Survey of India clarified that it was not involved in the project and that the replicas made by artists, were not exact models
- Maintenance: In 2023, local resident welfare associations raised concerns about garbage accumulation near the parking area and irregular cleaning. MCD issued a statement that additional sanitation staff had been deployed
- Ticket pricing: Some visitors and local groups argued that Rs 100 entry fee was high compared to other municipal parks of Delhi. SDMC stated that the fee was required for maintenance and security costs

Positive coverage Coverage in national dailies highlighted park as an example of waste-to-art and as an educational resource for children to learn about monuments from different states

== Controversies ==
No major legal controversies have been reported regarding the park as of August 2026.

In December 2021, a political controversy arose when opposition members in SDMC questioned the timing of inauguration ahead of municipal elections. The ruling party stated that the project had been delayed due to COVID-19 and was ready for public opening

In 2024, a video circulated on social media showing damage to one of the replicas due to strong winds. MCD later clarified that small structural repairs were carried out and that the structures are designed to hold normal weather conditions

== Location and accessibility ==
The park is located near Punjabi Bagh Metro Station on Green Line and Pink Line of Delhi Metro. It is approximately 12 Km from Connaught Place, New Delhi. DTC bus services are available to Punjabi Bag.

== See Also ==
- Waste to Wonder Park
