= Polish Garden (Saint Petersburg) =

Garden in Saint Petersburg, Russia

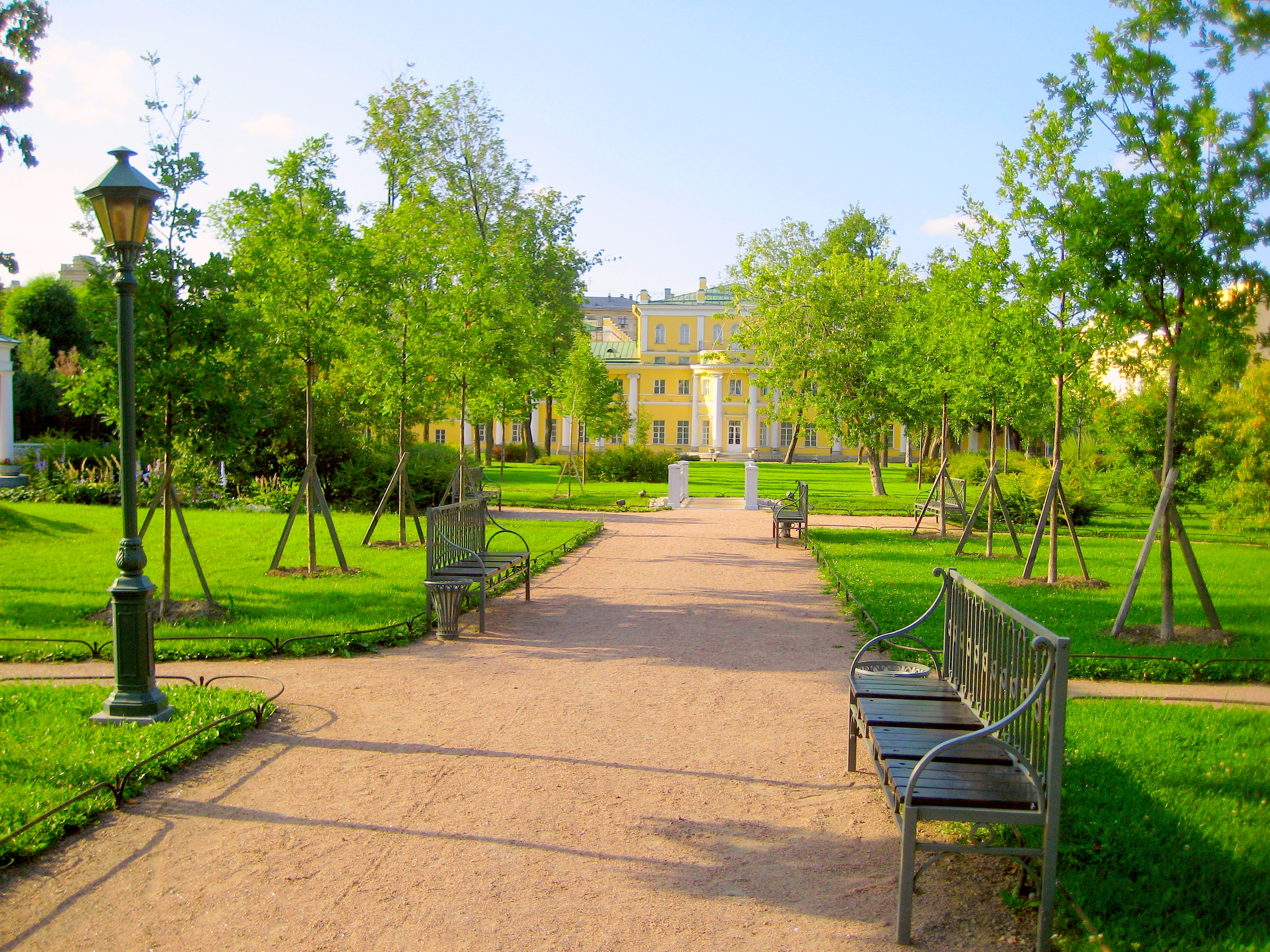
- The Polish Garden behind Derzhavin's Palace
- Interactive map of Polish Garden
- Type: Urban Park
- Location: Saint Petersburg, Russia
- Coordinates: 59.91806°N 30.31111°E
- Area: 2.3 hectares (5.7 acres)
- Open: All year

The Polish Garden (Russian: Польский сад, romanized: Polsky sad) is a 2.3–hectare garden and park complex in the Admiralteysky District of St. Petersburg, Russia.

== History ==
The Garden was named after the Polish community of Saint Petersburg which attended the Cathedral in the 19th century.

The predecessor of the current park was a private palatial garden in the courtyard of the estate belonging to Gavrila Derzhavin on the Fontanka, which was probably remodelled under the supervision of Nikolay Lvov.

In 2006, the park was acquired by the National Pushkin Museum and between 2007 and 2011 the park and the Derzhavin Palace were renovated. The renovated park opened in September 2011 with an entrance fee to visit it.

== Location ==
The park is bounded by the Fontanka River embankment to the north and the Catholic Cathedral of the Assumption of the Blessed Virgin Mary to the south.

== Gallery ==
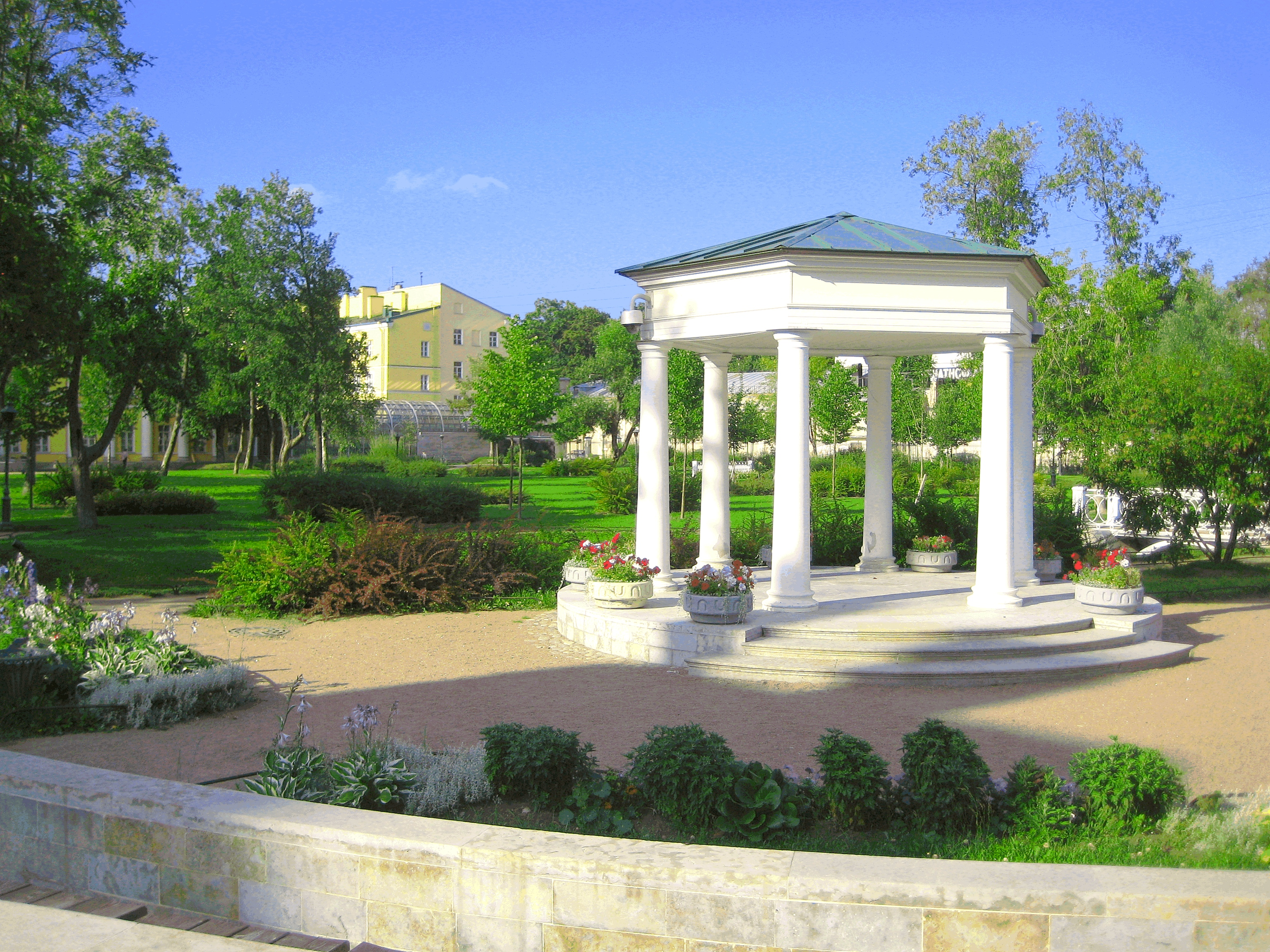

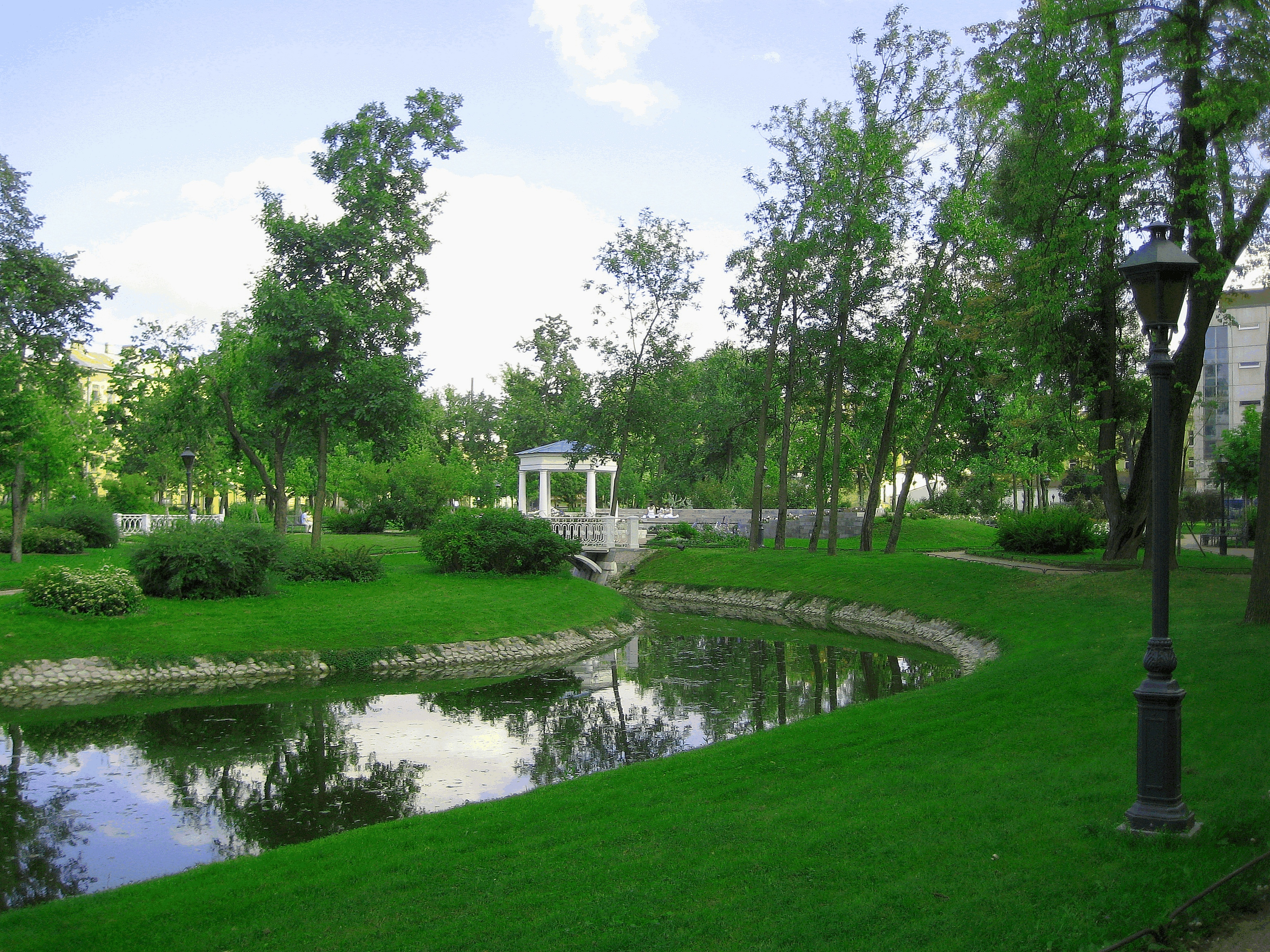

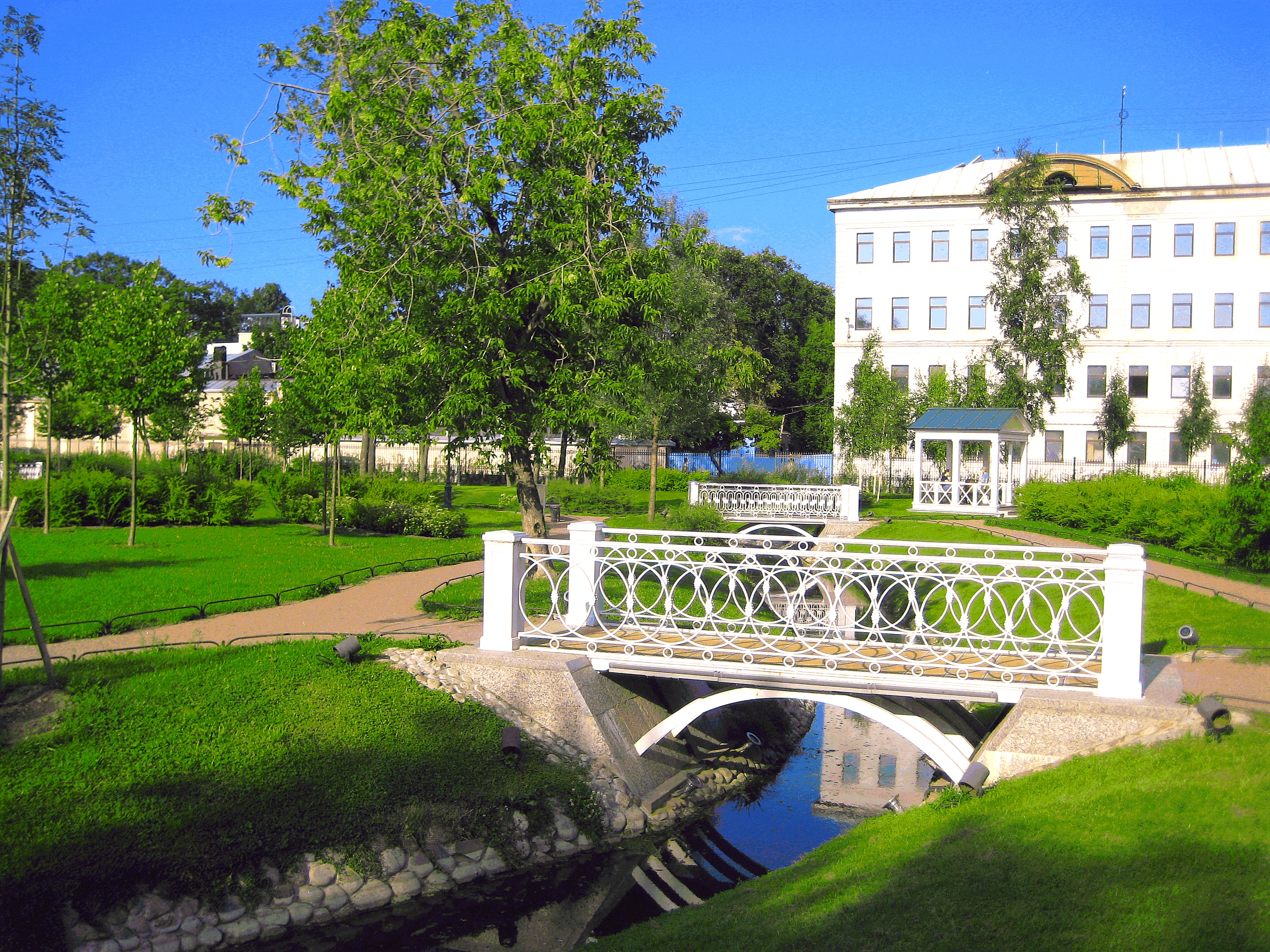

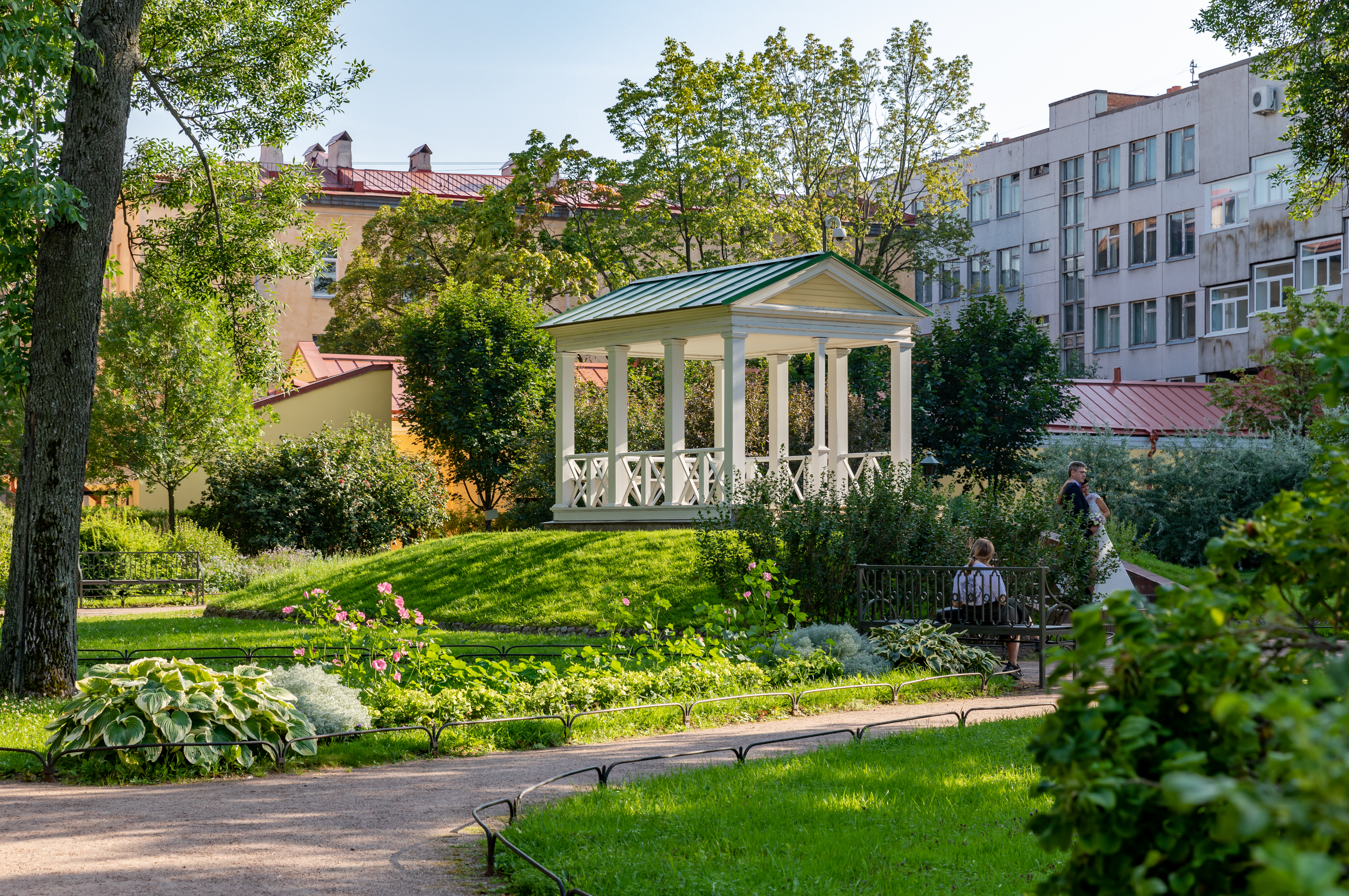

== See also ==
- Polish minority in Russia
- Neva
