= St. Stanislaus Church, Saint Petersburg =

Coordinates: 59.9226°N 30.2880°E

St. Stanislaus Church
- Храм Святого Станислава
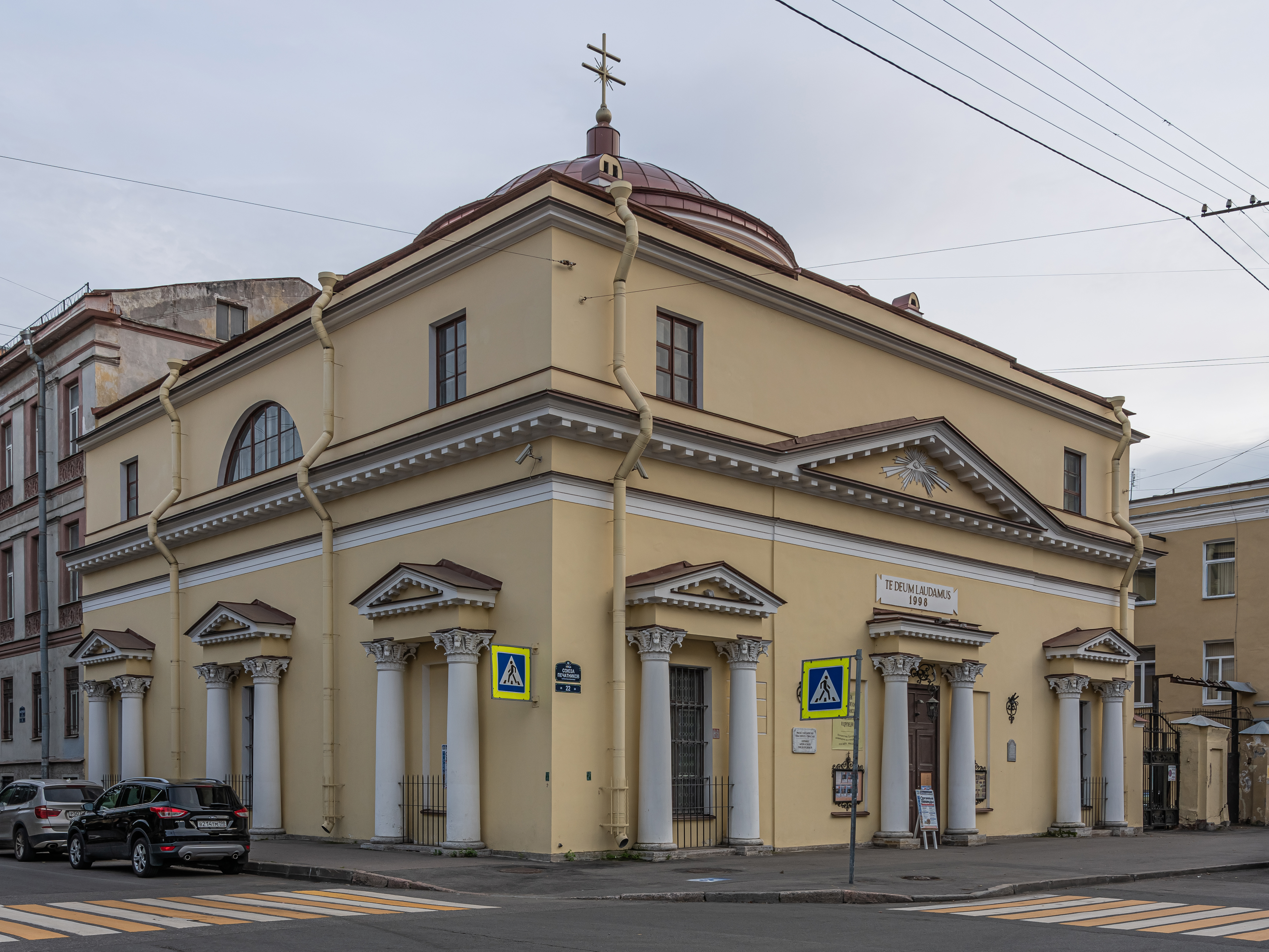
- St. Stanislaus Church
- Location: Saint Petersburg
- Country: Russia
- Denomination: Roman Catholic Church

Architecture
- Architect: David Visconti

The St. Stanislaus Church (Russian: Храм Святого Станислава) is a Catholic church in neoclassical style in Saint Petersburg in northwest Russia, dedicated to the St. Stanislaus of Szczepanów.

The church was built by Bishop Stanisław Bohusz Siestrzeńcewicz (1731–1826), the first Archbishop of Mogilev, in Saint Petersburg in 1783, who donated money and land which used to be his residence. The church, built between 1823 and 1825, is the work of Italian architect David Visconti. It has a capacity of seven hundred people. A year after the consecration, the archbishop was buried there. This was the second Catholic church built after the St. Catherine on Nevsky Prospekt. The parish had 10,200 faithful on the eve of the 1917 revolution had a parochial school and a charity. Bishop Antoni Malecki (1861–1935), who was deported to Siberia in 1930, officiated there from 1887 to 1921. A plaque commemorates his memory in the church.

A new residence in the imperial capital city for the Catholic Archbishop was built in 1849 and near it the new Cathedral of the Assumption of the Blessed Virgin Mary was built in 1870–1873.

After the fall of communism the church of St. Stanislaus was registered again in 1992. Since 1996, the parish priest has been Krzysztof Pożarski, an active organizer of Catholic and Polish community life in Russia. He publishes the Polish-language historical magazine Nasz Kraj (Our Country). He was also the initiator of placing plaques in the church in honor of Adam Mickiewicz, Antoni Małecki, and John Paul II.

== See also ==
- Roman Catholicism in Russia
- St. Stanislaus
