= Józef Płoszko =

Russian architect

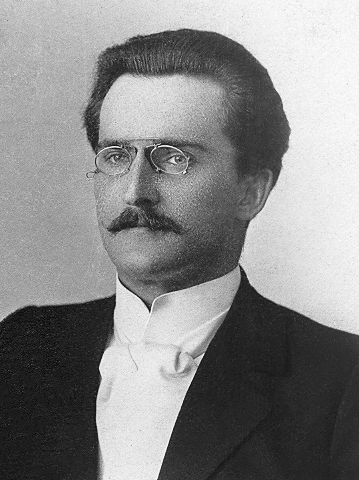
- Born: 1867; Russian Empire
- Died: 1931 (aged 63–64)
- Education: Saint Petersburg Academy of Fine Arts
- Known for: Architect
- Notable work: Baku Puppet Theatre; Church of the Immaculate Conception, Baku (1912); Mukhtarov's Mosque in Vladikavkaz; Palace of Happiness

Józef Płoszko (Azerbaijani: İosif Ploşko, Russian: Иосиф Плошко; 1867–1931) was a Russian architect of Polish origin of the late 19th and early 20th centuries, and was the author of multiple architectural projects in Baku, Russian Empire.

== Biography ==
Józef Płoszko was born in 1867. He studied at the Russian Imperial Academy of Arts, but soon left it and joined the Petersburg University of Civil Engineers. After graduation in 1895, Płoszko was sent to Kiev. Working there for two years, he moved to Baku at the invitation of another Polish architect, Józef Gosławski, and took charge as the chief architect at the Baku city administration's construction department. He later became the chief architect of Baku.

== Career in Baku ==
Płoszko had as client the millionaire Musa Naghiyev, but Murtuza Mukhtarov, Nuri Amiraslanov, the Rylskis - a rich Polish family - were also among his clients. In 1907, Agha Musa Naghiyev purchased an area in the center of the city on Nikolayevskaya Street (present Istiglaliyyat Street) and hired architect Płoszko to build a public-charity building in memory of his deceased son. The monumental Ismailiyya building based upon the pattern of the Doge's palace in Venice, was thus Płoszko's first independent work in Baku. This building immediately became one of the main architectural sites of the city. Today, it houses the Presidium of the National Academy of Sciences of Azerbaijan.

After that, Płoszko led construction of two private houses of Musa Naghiyev in the centre of Baku – residential houses on Telefonnaya (now 28 May Street) and Torgovaya Street (now Nizami Street). The architect's second significant order was the construction of the mosque in Vladikavkaz city, which was commissioned by Murtuza Mukhtarov. Płoszko familiarized himself with Islamic architecture on monuments of religious architecture in Baku. A temple finished in 1908 and called "Mukhtarov’s mosque" was built on the coast of the Terek River and is one of the most beautiful buildings of Vladikavkaz.

This mosque was followed by construction of other cultic objects. Płoszko restored Juma Mosque in Shamakhi and commissioned a Catholic Polish church (kostel) in Baku. However, construction of the church couldn't be completed because of a lack of building material, although a scaled down version was eventually finished. In 1918, during the First World War, the mosque was significantly damaged.

Płoszko also constructed the Baku Puppet Theatre in 1908, which was initially used as cinema called "Phenomenon".

In 1909, Płoszko worked on the Catholic Church of Blessed Virgin Mary in Baku, the construction of which was finished in 1912. The church was constructed by funds donated by Polish industrialists – the Rylskis and Witold Zglenicki, founder of petroleum production in the Caspian Sea. The church was constructed in Gothic style, with usage of elements of Polish Gothicism. The building was located in a prestigious part of Bakubut was demolished in the 1930s. Construction of the "Palace of Happiness" in the center of Baku ordered by oil industrialist Murtuza Mukhtarov was Płoszko's next work, which now is a city administration building.

A mansion for Kerbalayi Israfil Hajiyev on Shemakhinskaya Street (now Jabbarli Street) was built by Płoszko in 1910-1912's. He also oversaw the construction of a four-storeyed building in a traditional style on Politseyskaya Street (now Mammadaliyev Street) by the order of the Rylski brothers. In 1919, the first Diplomatic Administration of Poland in the Azerbaijan Democratic Republic was placed in this building, and headed by Stefan Rylski.

Józef Płoszko last work before World War I was the New Europe hotel, which was commissioned by Agha Musa Naghiyev on Qoncharovskaya Street (now Taghiyev Street). The hotel was equipped with state of the art technology of the time, sporting four elevators, sanitary appliances, central heating and concealed wiring. Reinforced concrete was broadly used as a load-bearing structure. As in all previous projects of Płoszko's, the façade of the building was made from local limestone aglay.

== Final years and death ==
Płoszko stayed in Baku after the October Revolution, worked as an engineer with Ziverbey Ahmadbeyov, another famous architect of his time, and participated in discussions of agglomerator city projects on Absheron Peninsula. In 1925, after nearly thirty years living in Azerbaijan, he moved to Warsaw, and then to France. He died in 1931.

== Buildings designed by Józef Płoszko ==
Construction date	Demolition date	Address	Owner	Annotations
1908–1913	-	Nikolayevskaya Street 10	Musa Naghiyev	"Ismailiyya" (Muslim Charity Society/Presidium of the National Academy of Sciences of Azerbaijan)
1908–1910	-	Neftchiler Avenue	-	"Phenomenon" cinema/Baku Puppet Theatre
1911–1912	-	Polukhin Street 6	Murtuza Mukhtarov	Mansion/The Palace of happiness
1899–1900	-	Balakhanskaya Street		2-storeyed residential house
1899–1900	-	Bolshaya Morskaya Street 65, corner of Pojarnaya lane	-	Building of fire brigade
-	-	Telefonnaya Street 4-6	Agha Musa Naghiyev	Residential house
1909-1914(?)	1930(1931-?)	Corner of Kaspiyskaya and Merkuriyevskaya Streets	Catholic community	Catholic church of Blessed Virgin Mary
1910	-	Telefonnaya Street 10		4-storeyed residential house
1910	-	Torgovaya Street 89	-	4-storeyed residential house
1910	-	Corner of Torgovaya and Gogol Streets		4-storeyed residential house
1912	-	Politseyskaya Street 11	Rylski brothers	Rylsky brothers' house
1900	2010	Mammadaliyev Street	-	Residential house with atlantes
1912	-	Shemakhinskaya Street 12	Kerbelayi Israfil Hajiyev	Mansion
1913	1974	Bayil district		2-storeyed residential house
-	-	Goncharovskaya Street 13	Agha Musa Naghiyev	"New Europe" hotel/"Goy-Gol"
1912	-	Boulevard, near "Inturist" hotel	-	3-storeyed apartment house
1913	-	Corner of Birjevaya and Krasnovodskaya Streets		3-storeyed apartment house
1910	-	Kaspiyskaya Street 25		3-storeyed apartment house
1910	-	Mariinskaya Street 23		3-storeyed apartment house
1912	-	Nikolayevskaya Street 21		3-storeyed apartment house
1900–1908		Vladikavkaz	Murtuza Mukhtarov	Mukhtarov Mosque

== Gallery ==
Buildings constructed by Józef Płoszko

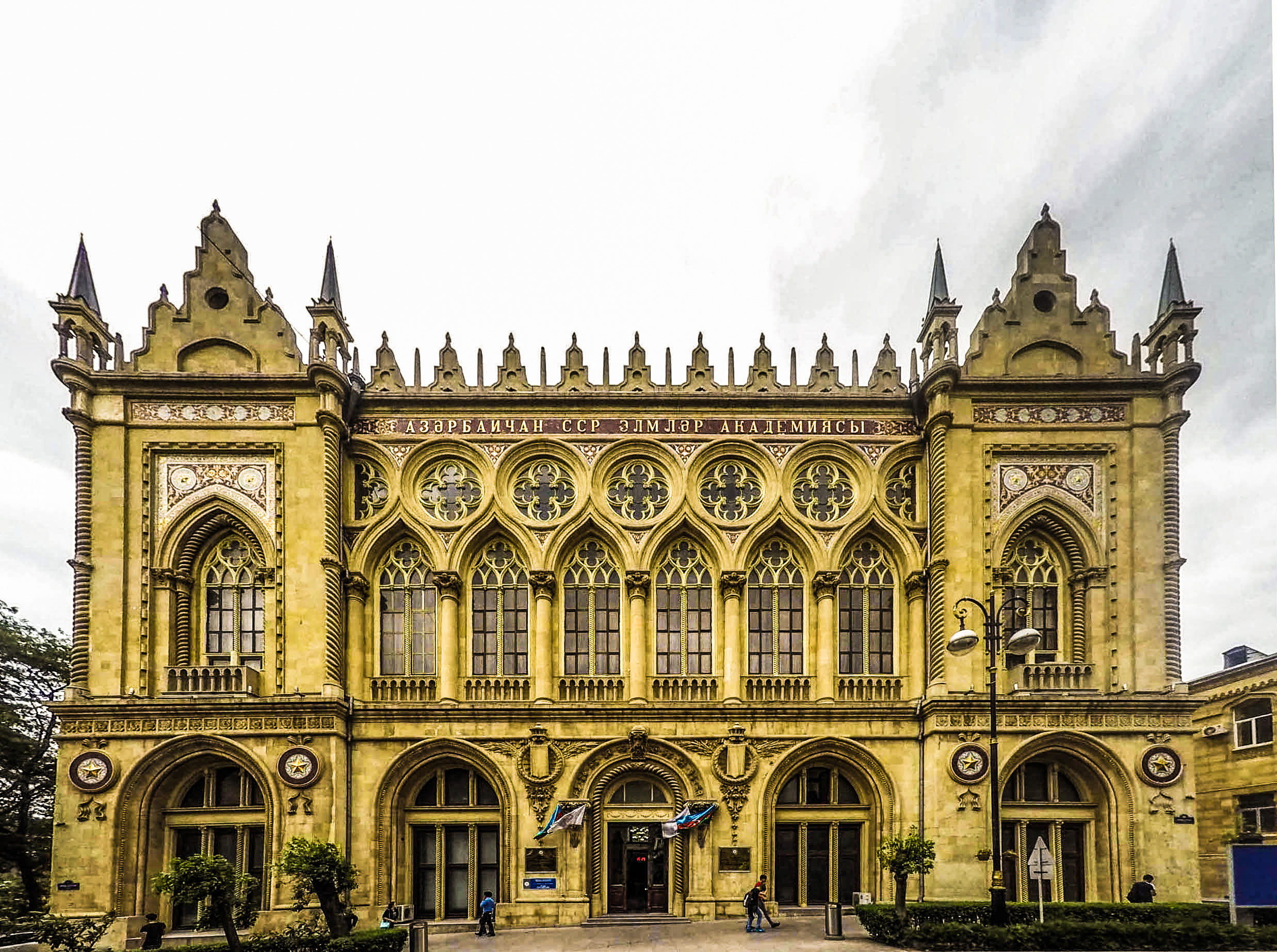
Ismailiyya building in Baku

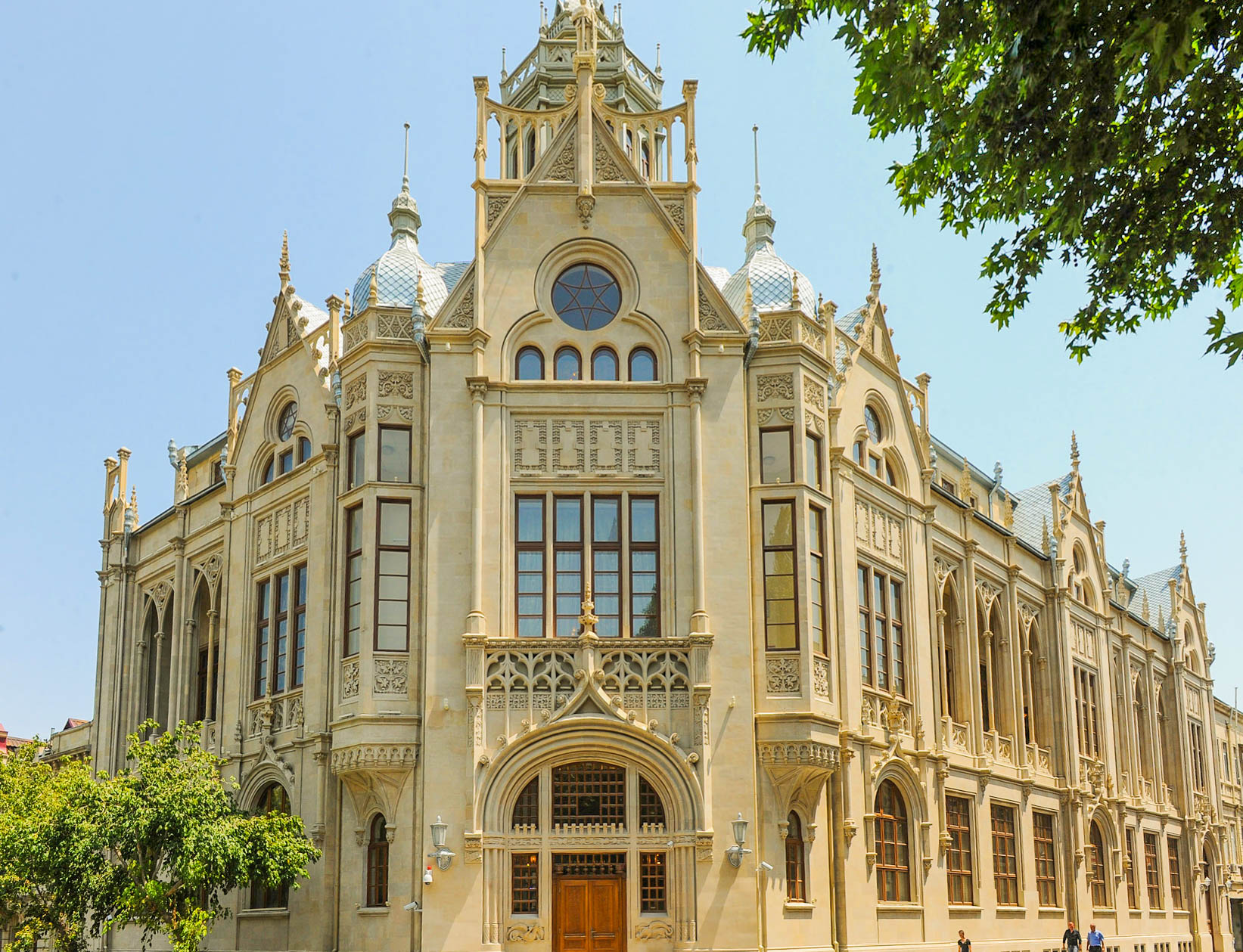
The "Palace of Happiness" in Baku

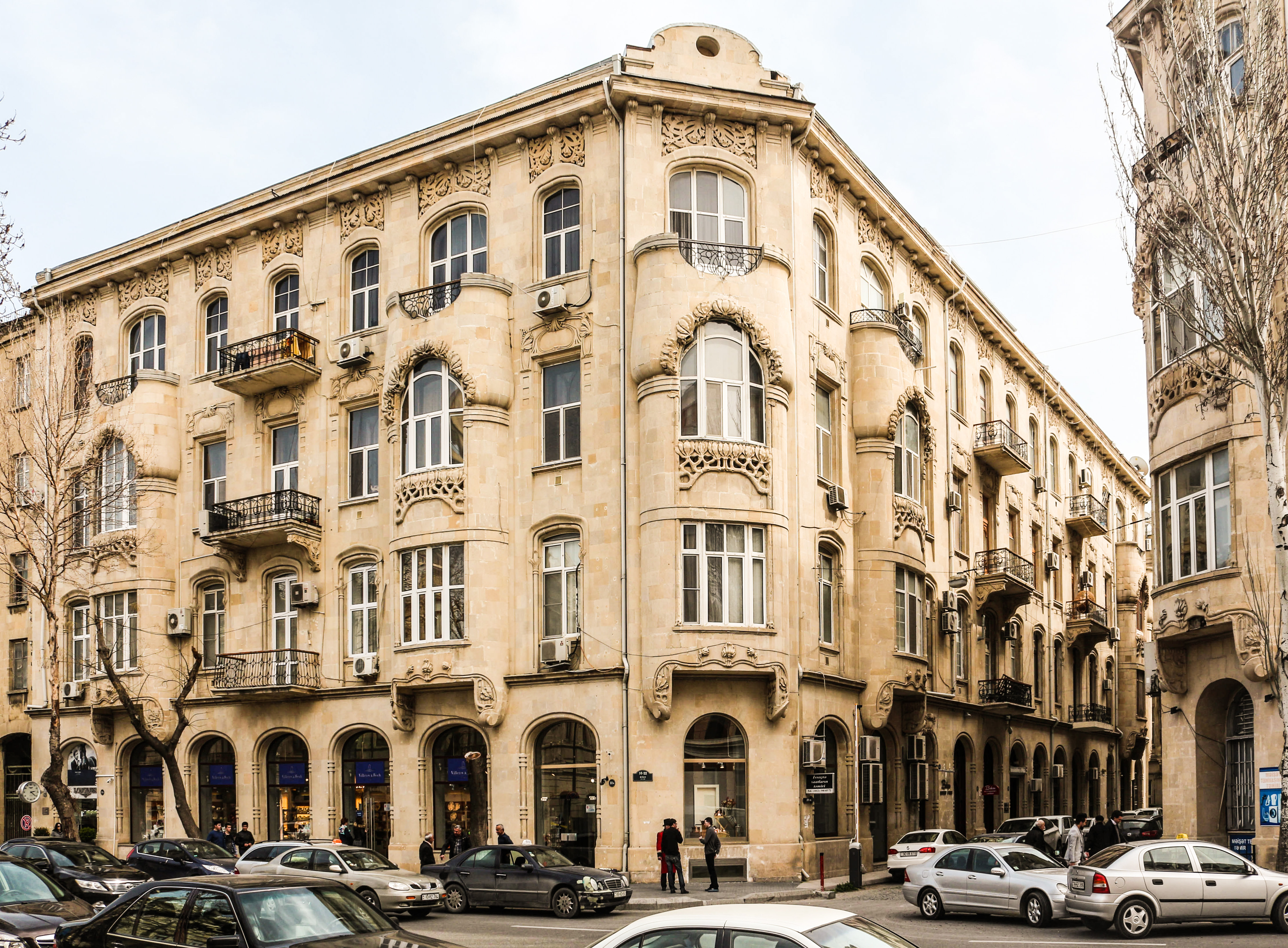
Naghiyev's house on 28 May street

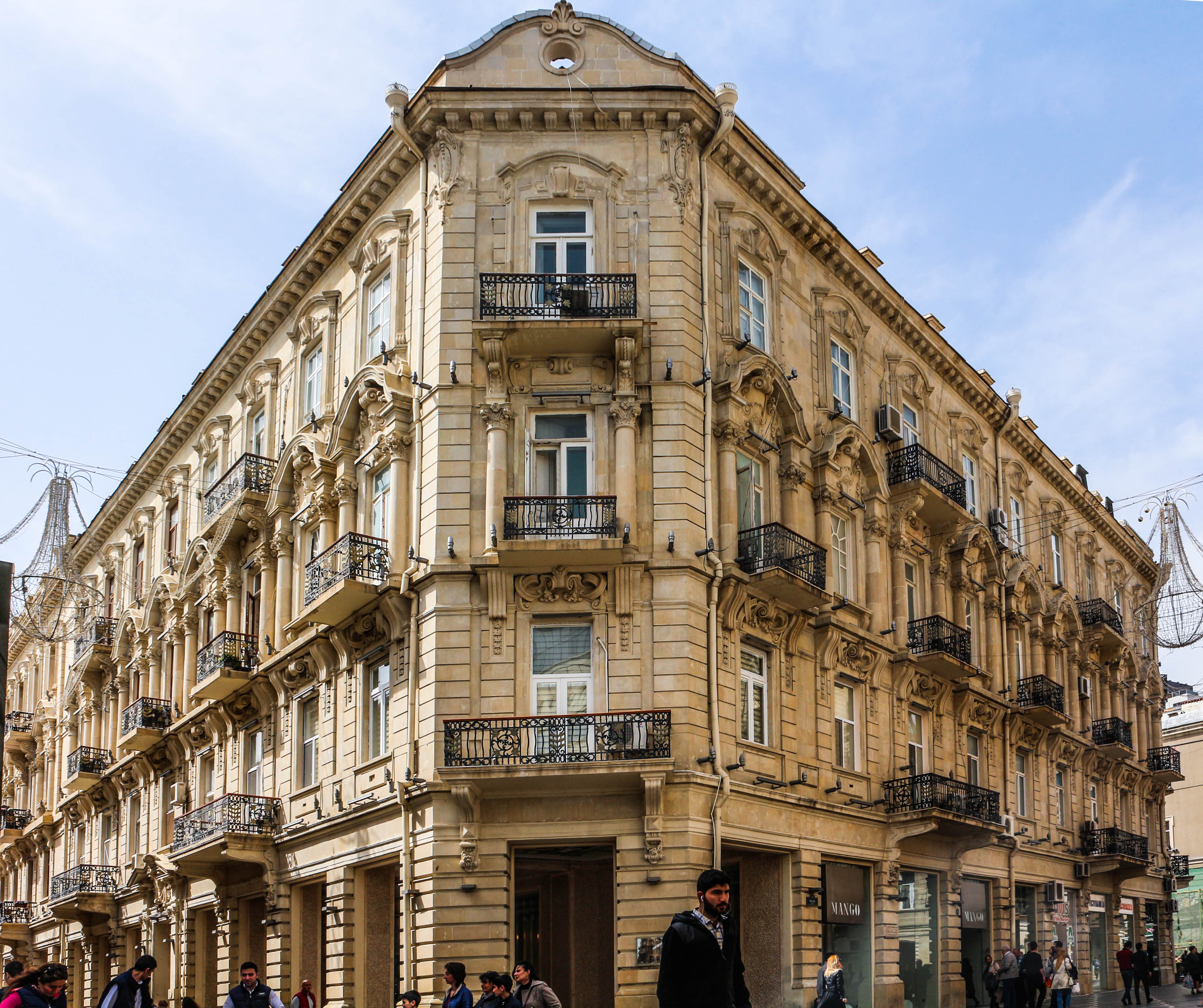
Musa Naghiyev's house on Nizami Street

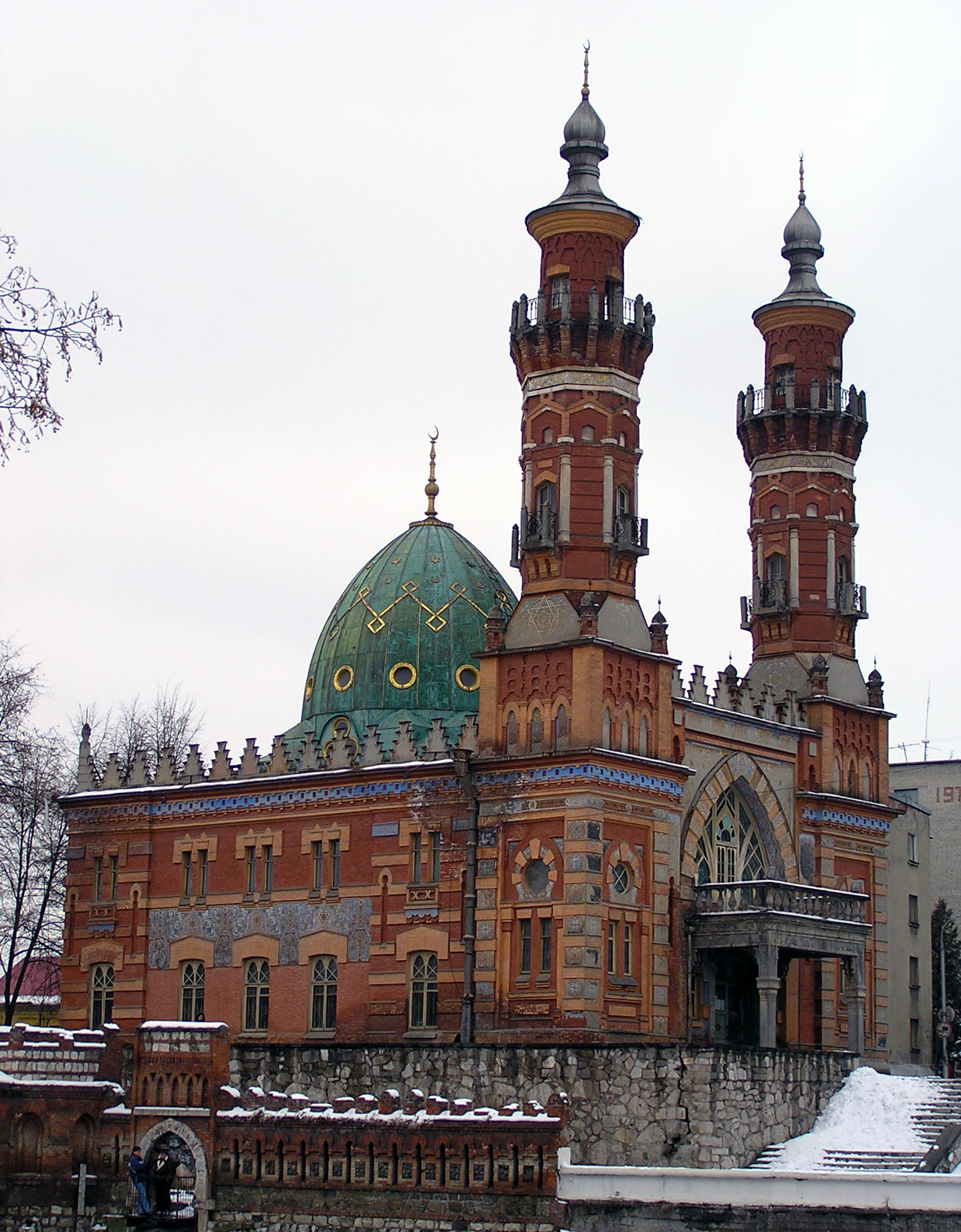
Mukhtarov's mosque in Vladikavkaz

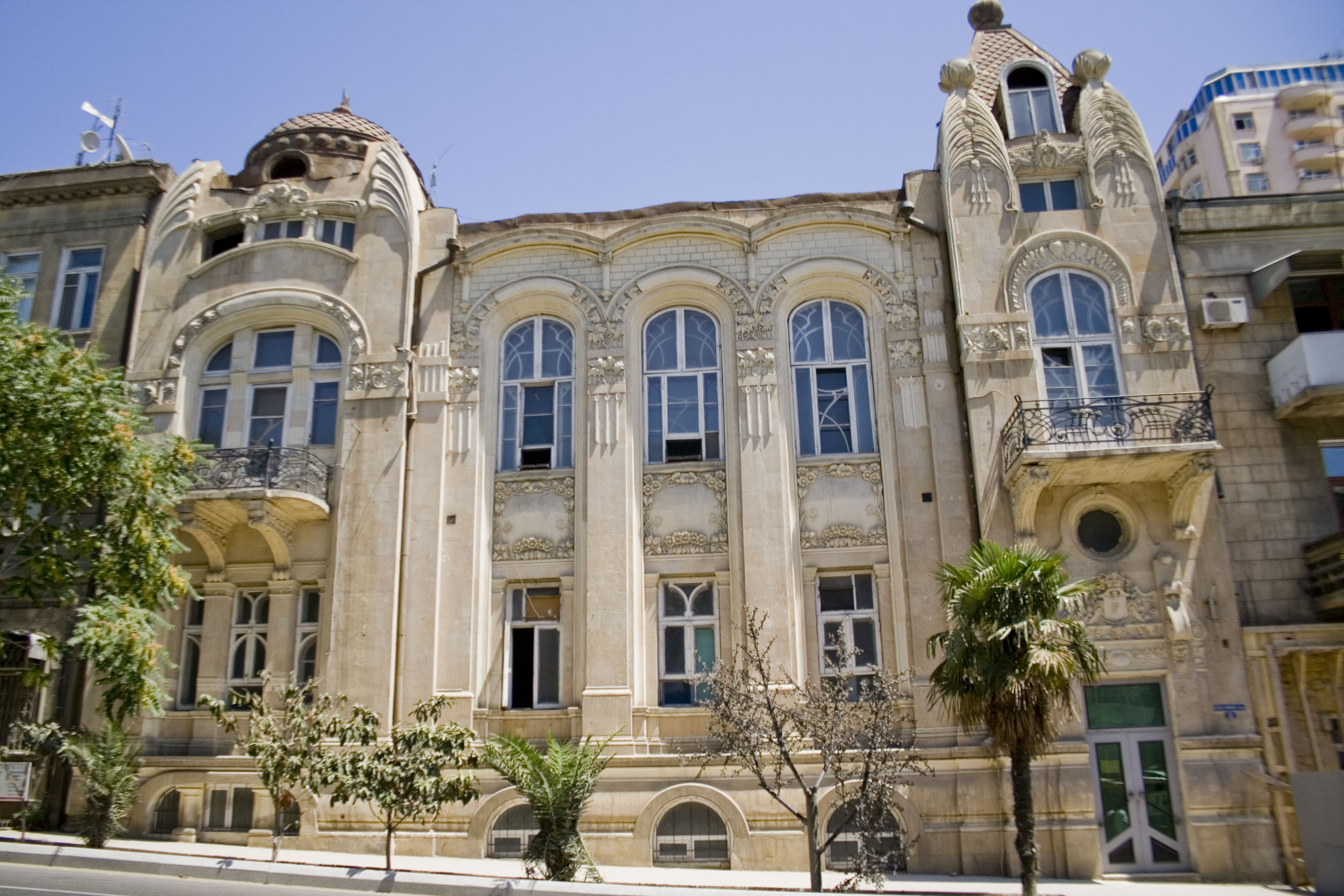
The mansion of Kerbalayi Israfil Hajiyev on Shemakhinskaya Street (now Jabbarli Street)

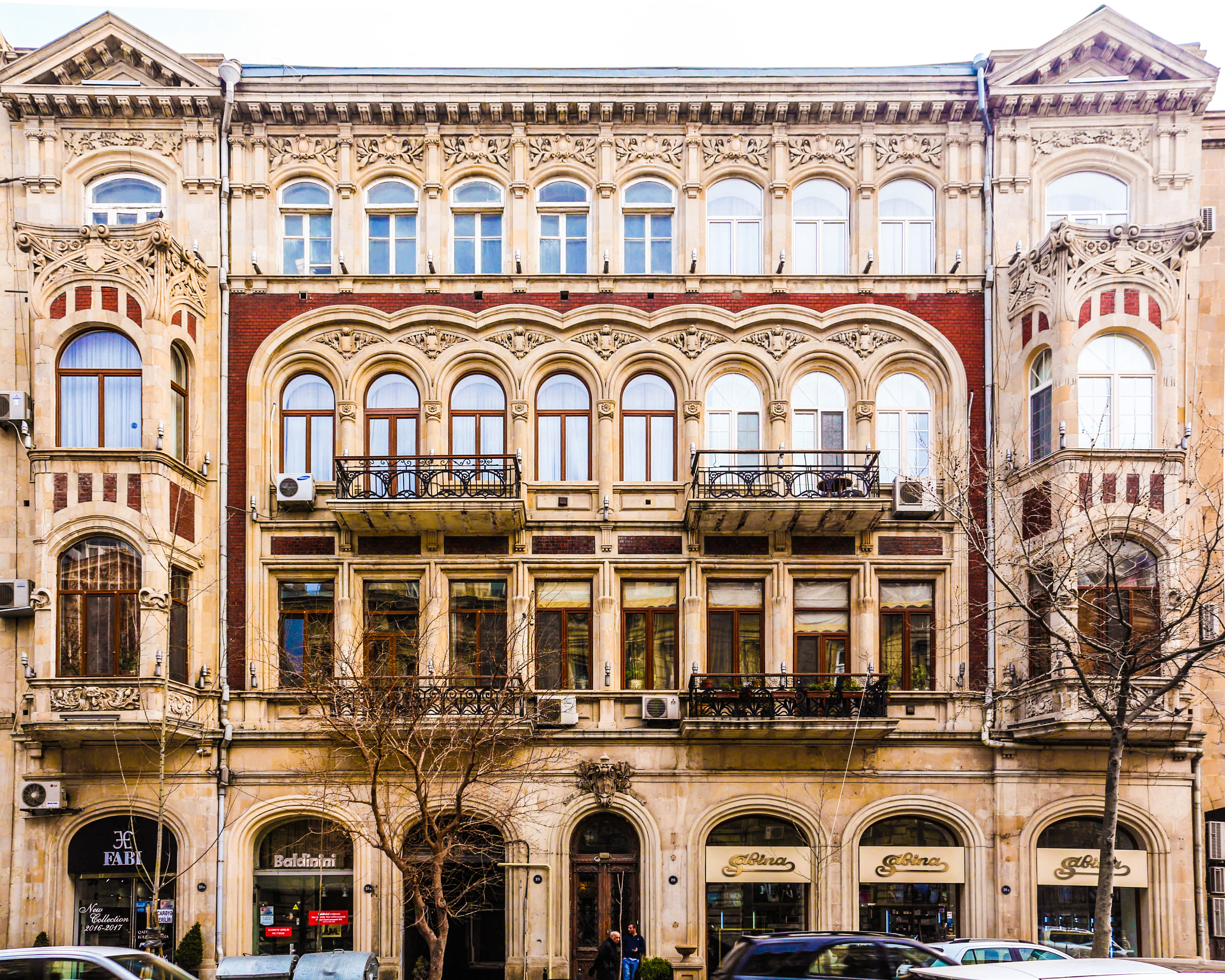
4-storeyed residential house on 28 May Street

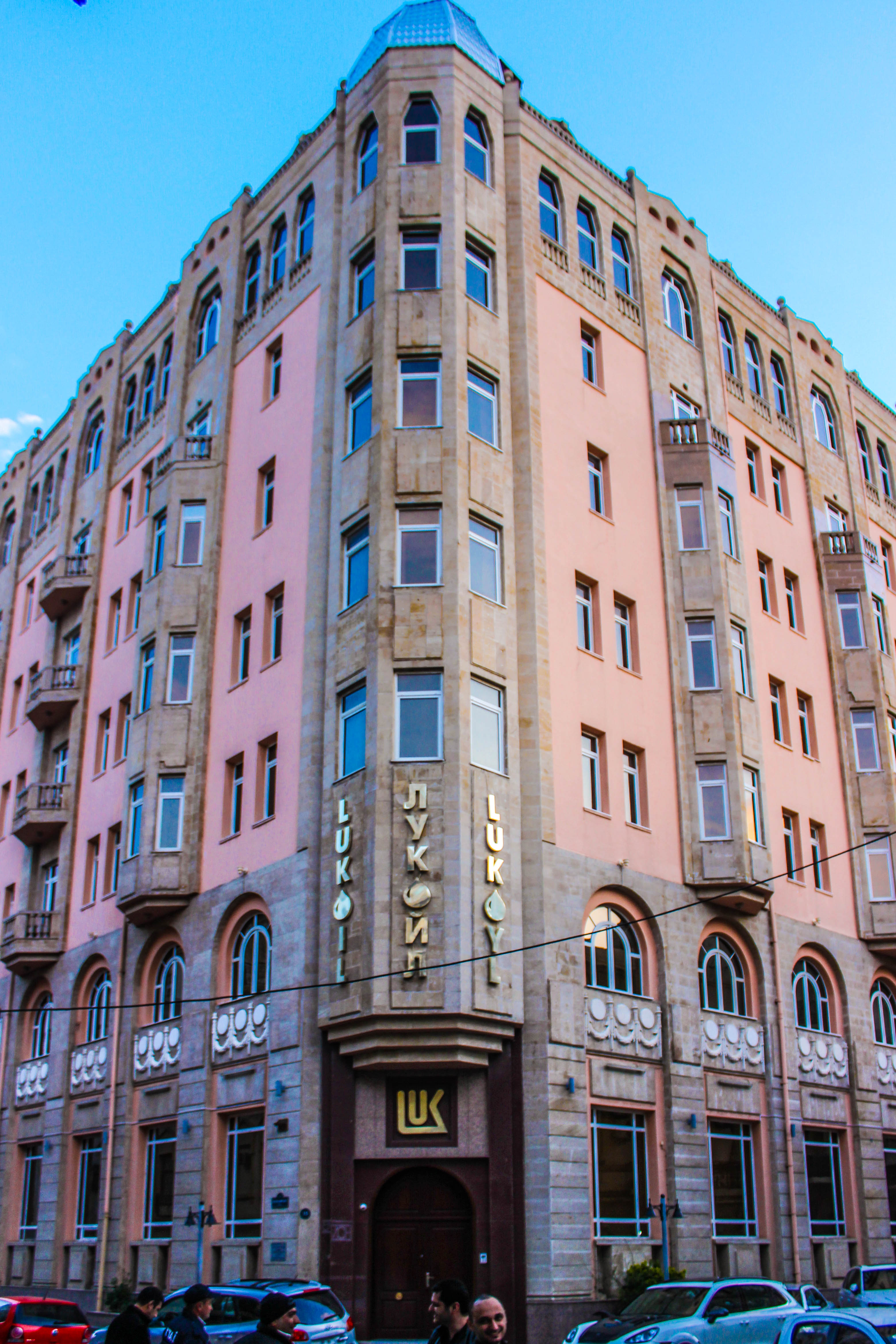
The six-storeyed building of “New Europe” hotel on Taghiyev Street

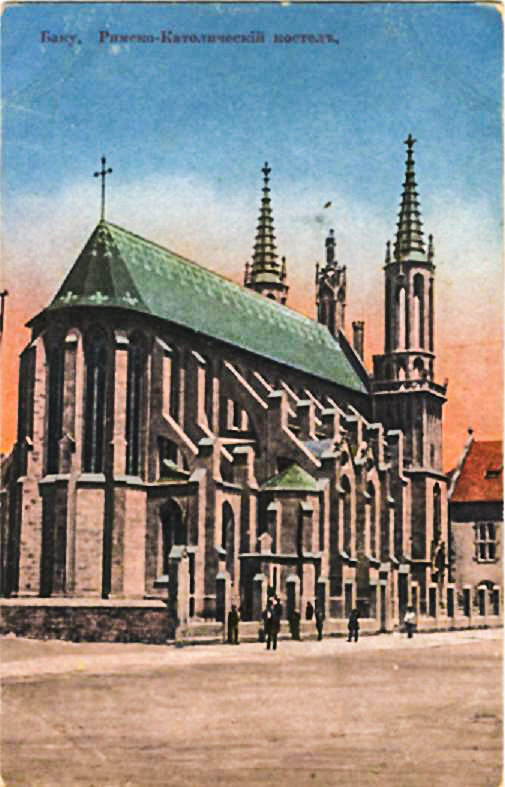
Catholic church of Blessed Virgin Mary in Baku

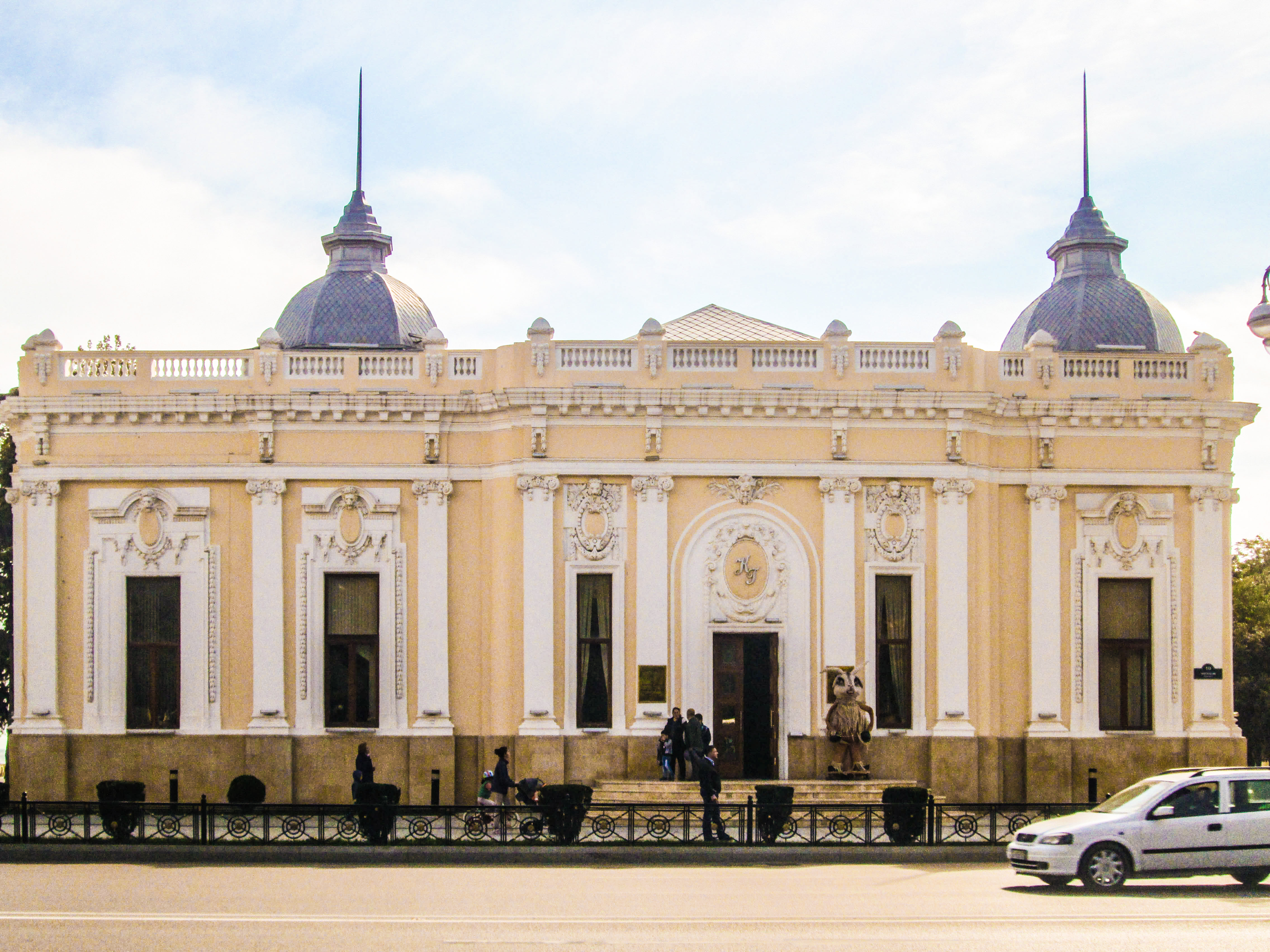
Building of Baku Puppet Theatre
