= Vladimír Fekete =

Azerbaijani Roman Catholic prelate

Vladimír Fekete, S.D.B.
- Titular Bishop of Municipa, Apostolic Prefect of Apostolic Prefecture of Azerbaijan
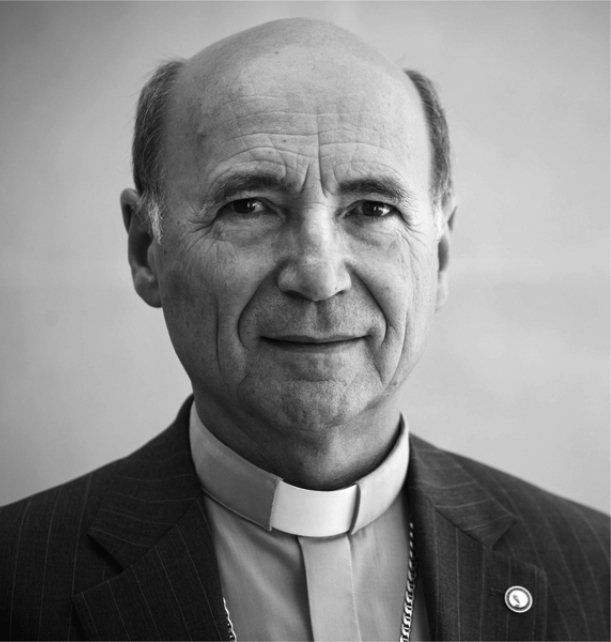
- Church: Roman Catholic Church
- Appointed: 5 November 2009 (as Superior of Mission sui iuris); 4 August 2011 (as Apostolic Prefect)
- Predecessor: Ján Čapla (Superior)
- Successor: Incumbent

Orders
- Ordination: 30 January 1983 (Priest) by Wolfgang Weider
- Consecration: 11 February 2018 (Bishop) by Paul Richard Gallagher

Personal details
- Born: Vladimír Fekete; 11 August 1955 (age 69); Chorvátsky Grob, Czechoslovakia (present day Slovakia)
- Coat of arms

Bishop Vladimír Fekete, S.D.B. (born 11 August 1955 in Chorvátsky Grob, Czechoslovakia, present day Slovakia) is a Slovak-born Roman Catholic prelate as the Apostolic Prefect of Apostolic Prefecture of Azerbaijan (since 5 November 2009 until 4 August 2011 as Superior of the Mission sui iuris) and Titular Bishop of Municipa (since 8 December 2017).

== Life ==
Bishop Fekete was born in the Roman Catholic family in Chorvátsky Grob. After graduation of the school education in his native city, he continued his study with mathematics and geology at the Faculty of Natural Sciences of the Comenius University. During this time he clandestinely joined the Salesians of Don Bosco and made a profession on 15 February 1975. With the solemn profession in 1981, he was ordained as priest on 30 January 1983, after completed his clandestine philosophical and theological study.

Until 1989 he worked as geologist and secretly made a pastoral work among youth. After 1989 Fr. Fekete performed such ministries: as provincial vicar of the Salesians in Slovakia (1993–1999) and a provincial superior in Slovakia (1999–2005). Also he made a licentiate degree at the Catholic University of Lublin (1999).

On 5 November 2009 he was appointed by Pope Benedict XVI as the Superior of the Mission sui iuris of Baku (on 2011 this Mission was elevated in a rank of Prefecture Apostolic), and on 8 December 2017 by Pope Francis he was appointed as Titular Bishop of Municipa. On 11 February 2018 he was consecrated as bishop by Archbishop Paul Richard Gallagher and other prelates of the Roman Catholic Church.

Catholic Church titles
Preceded by Ján Čapla	Superior of Mission sui iuris of Baku; 2009–2011	Succeeded by himself as Apostolic Prefect
Preceded by himself as Superior of Mission sui iuris	Apostolic Prefect of Apostolic Prefecture of Azerbaijan; 2011–present	Succeeded by Incumbent
Preceded by Leon Lemmens	Titular Bishop of Municipa; 2017–present	Succeeded by Incumbent
