= Christ the Redeemer Church, Valletta =

Church of Christ the Redeemer
- Knisja ta' Ġesu Redentur (Tas-Sagramentini)
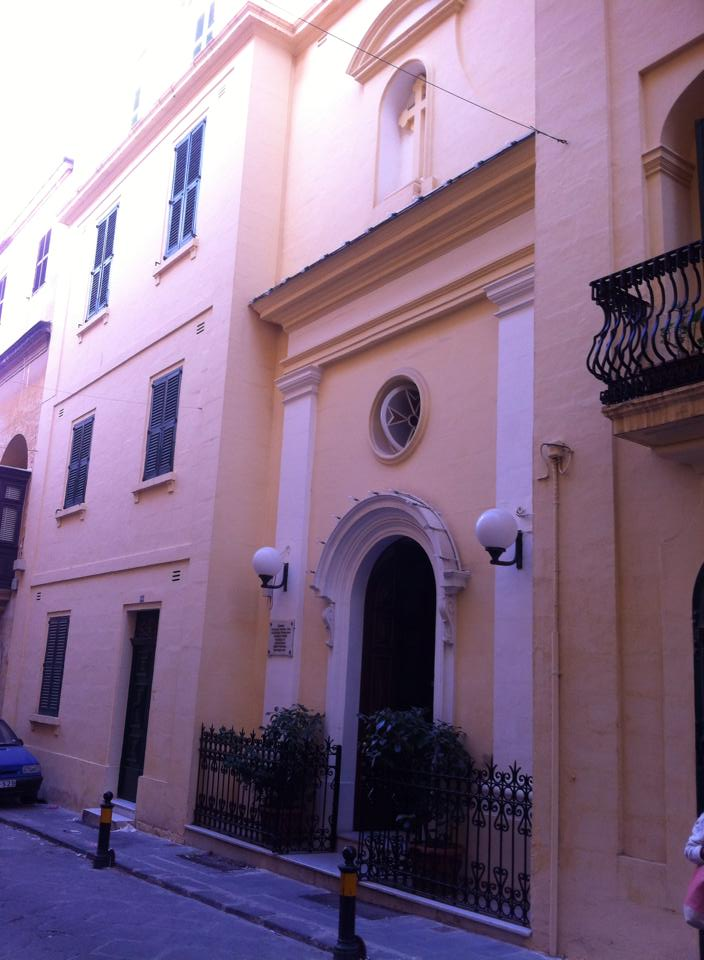

- Location within Malta
- 35°53′56.8″N 14°30′55.6″E
- Location: Valletta
- Country: Malta
- Denomination: Roman Catholic

History
- Status: Active
- Founded: 17th century
- Dedication: Christ the Redeemer

Architecture
- Functional status: Church

Administration
- Archdiocese: Malta
- Parish: St Dominic's parish Valletta

Christ the Redeemer Church is a church in Valletta, the capital of Malta. It stands as a corner house number 146 on St Christopher Street.

== Description ==
The history of the church began in 1692, when Friar Andrea, a Maltese Jesuit from Valletta, opened the building as a conservatory for girls. These were orphans, rejected by their families or had no possibility of "living honestly in poverty and misery". Fr. Andrea received charitable collections from the Knights of Malta as well as from wealthy Maltese. This went in aid of the girls and to cover cost and upkeep of the conservatory. Fr. Andrea also opened a second home for battered women.

The Little Church of Christ the Redeemer (in Maltese: Kristu Redentur), commonly known as Sagaramentini Church for the Perpetual Adoration, is part of the same building. It belonged to the Adoration Sisters of Mary. When the sisters left Malta in 1923, Archbishop Mauro Caruana called on Reverend Mother Margherita of the Franciscan Sisters of the Heart of Jesus to take over the house and church.

Without any financial assistance, the Franciscan nuns accepted the invitation and contributed by promoting a daily adoration to our Lord in Sacrament. They continued the daily exposition and adoration of the Blessed Sacrament, often hosting girls in their house of retreat.

The church building is listed on the National Inventory of the Cultural Property of the Maltese Islands.

== See also ==
- Culture of Malta
- History of Malta
- List of Churches in Malta
- Religion in Malta
