= Apostolic Prefecture of Azerbaijan =

Catholic jurisdiction in Azerbaijan

Apostolic Prefecture of Azerbaijan Praefectura Apostolica Azerbaigianiensis Azərbaycan Həvari Prefekti
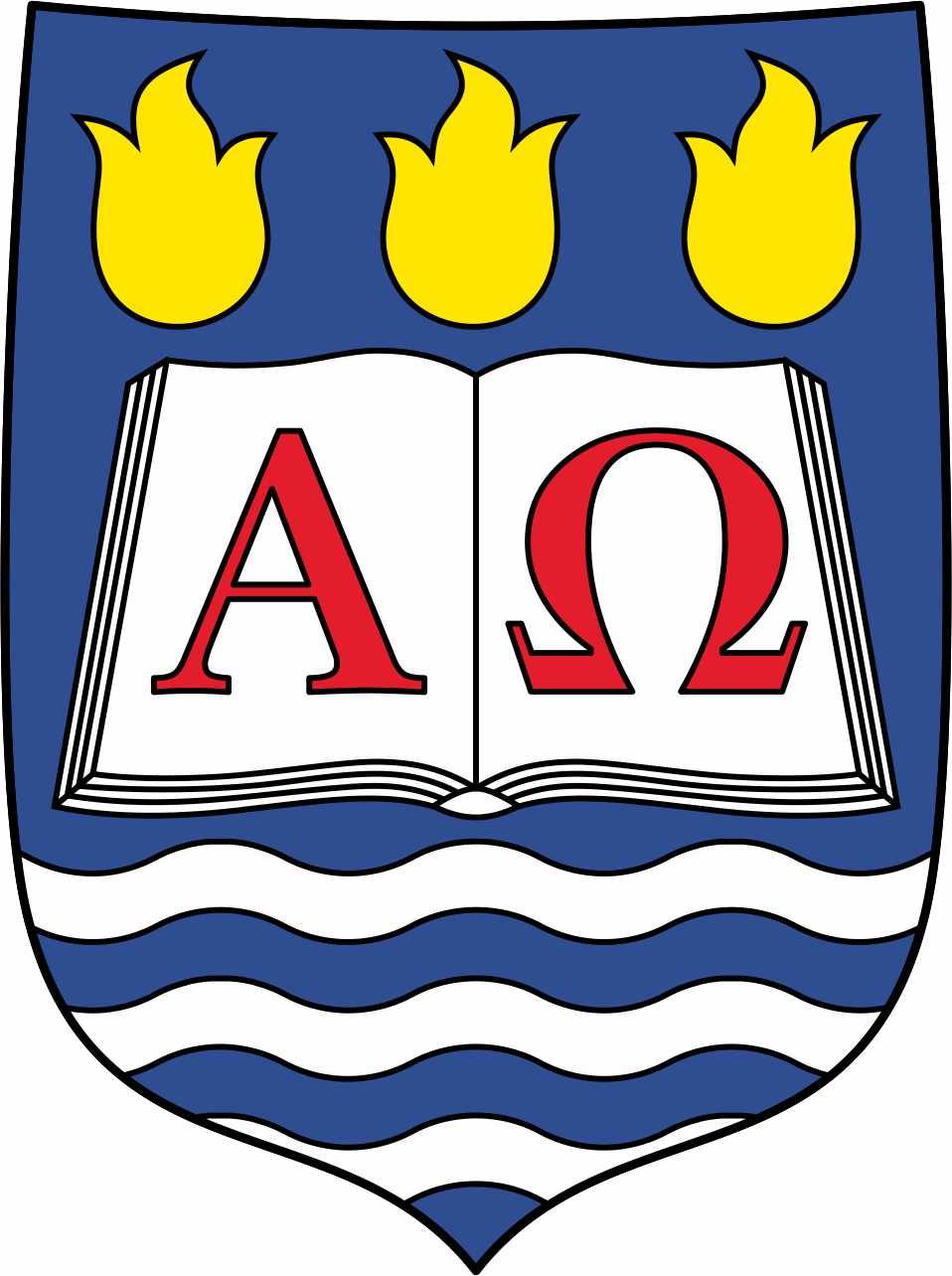
- Coat of arms of Prefecture

Location
- Country: Azerbaijan

Statistics
- Area: 86,600 km^{2} (33,400 sq mi)
- Population: Total; Catholics: (as of 2017); 9,800,000; 580 (0%)

Information
- Denomination: Roman Catholic
- Sui iuris church: Latin Church
- Rite: Latin Rite
- Established: 4 August 2011
- Cathedral: Church of the Immaculate Conception

Current leadership
- Apostolic Prefect: Bishop Vladimir Fekete, S.D.B.

Website
- Website of the Prefecture

The Apostolic Prefecture of Azerbaijan is a Roman Catholic Apostolic Prefecture (missionary jurisdiction) in Baku, the capital of Azerbaijan. It is exempt, i.e. directly subject to the Holy See, not part of any ecclesiastical province. It has one church and four chapels situated in Baku, including its pro-cathedral the Church of the Immaculate Conception. Its legal status is ensured by the local law of the Azerbaijan Republic and has a special status thanks to the Concordat signed by Pope John Paul II and former president Heydar Aliyev.

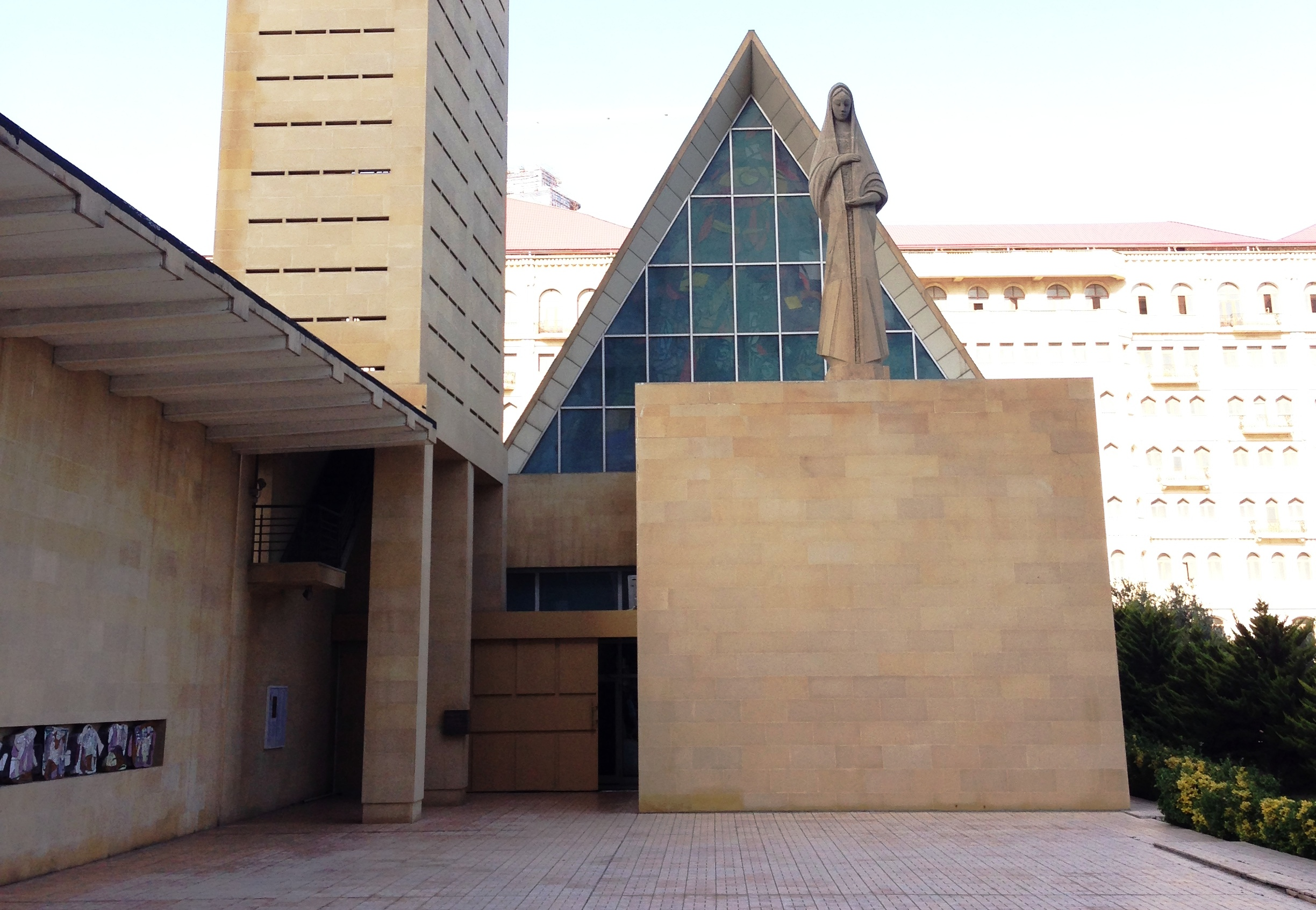
Church of the Immaculate Conception in Baku, Azerbaijan

== History ==
It was established on 11 October 2000 as Mission sui iuris of Baku, on territory split from the Apostolic Administration of the Caucasus. On 4 August 2011, it was promoted as Apostolic Prefecture of Azerbaijan.

== Incumbents ==
So far, there are three Monastic Orders: Salesians of Don Bosco (S.D.B.), Missionaries of Charity (C.M) (also known as Sisters of Mother Teresa) and Salesian Sisters (F.M.A.). There is no diocesan priest and only seven of the Salesian community are Catholic priests.

- Friar Jozef Daniel Pravda, S.D.B. (11. 10. 2000 – 18. 7. 2003)
- Friar Ján Čapla, S.D.B. (18. 7. 2003 – 11. 05. 2009)
- Friar Vladimir Fekete, S.D.B. (11. 05. 2009 – 04. 08. 2011)

Apostolic Prefects of Azerbaijan

- Bishop Vladimir Fekete, S.D.B. (04. 08. 2011 – present; named a bishop, by Pope Francis, while remaining Apostolic Prefect of Azerbaijan, on 12. 08. 2017; consecrated on 11 February 2018)

== See also ==
- Roman Catholicism in Azerbaijan

== Source and External links ==
- GigaCatholic, with incumbent biography links
