= Christ the Redeemer (Mantegna) =

Painting by Andrea Mantegna

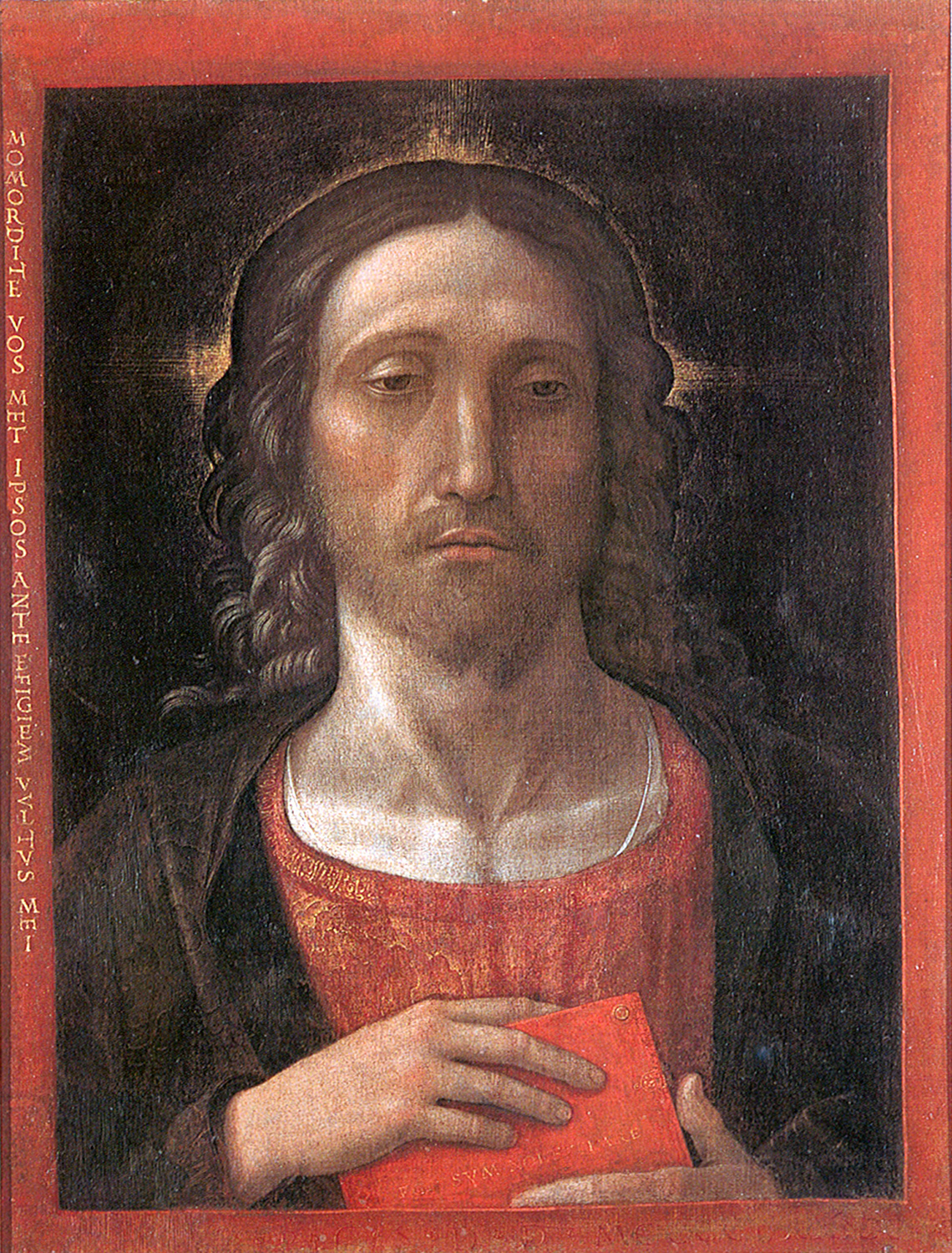
- Artist: Andrea Mantegna
- Year: 1493
- Medium: Tempera on canvas
- Dimensions: 55 cm × 45 cm (22 in × 18 in)
- Location: Museo Il Correggio, Correggio

Christ the Redeemer is a painting of 1493 in tempera on canvas by Andrea Mantegna. It is in the Museo Il Correggio in Correggio, Emilia Romagna.

== Bibliography ==
- Pauli, Tatjana (2001), Mantegna, Art Book (in Italian), Milan: Leonardo Arte, ISBN 9788883101878
