= Christ the Redeemer Parish =

Catholic parish in Baku, Azerbaijan

Christ the Redeemer Parish is a Catholic parish in Baku, Azerbaijan (Teymur Aliyev St., 69/b/1). It includes Christ the Redeemer Chapel, based in a private house purchased by Salesians, there is also a library. CRP maintains the Parish Social Ministry as well. The current parish priest is Father Slavko Shvigra. When the new building of the Church of the Immaculate Conception of the Blessed Virgin Mary was finished, the main church services have been transferred there.

Now the chapel is a service place for Salesians, who live in the same building.
