= Cathedral of the Assumption of the Blessed Virgin Mary (Saint Petersburg) =

Catholic cathedral in St. Petersburg, Russia

Coordinates: 59°54′58″N 30°18′44″E

Cathedral of the Assumption of the Blessed Virgin Mary was a Catholic cathedral in the city of St. Petersburg from 1873 to 1926 and the residence of the Metropolitan Archbishop of Mogilev, the head of the Catholic Church in the Russian Empire. Administratively it belongs to the North-West region Catholic Archdiocese of Moscow, led by Archbishop Metropolitan Paolo Pezzi. Cathedral is closed to the building from the street, which is Russia's only Catholic seminary Mary Queen of the Apostles.

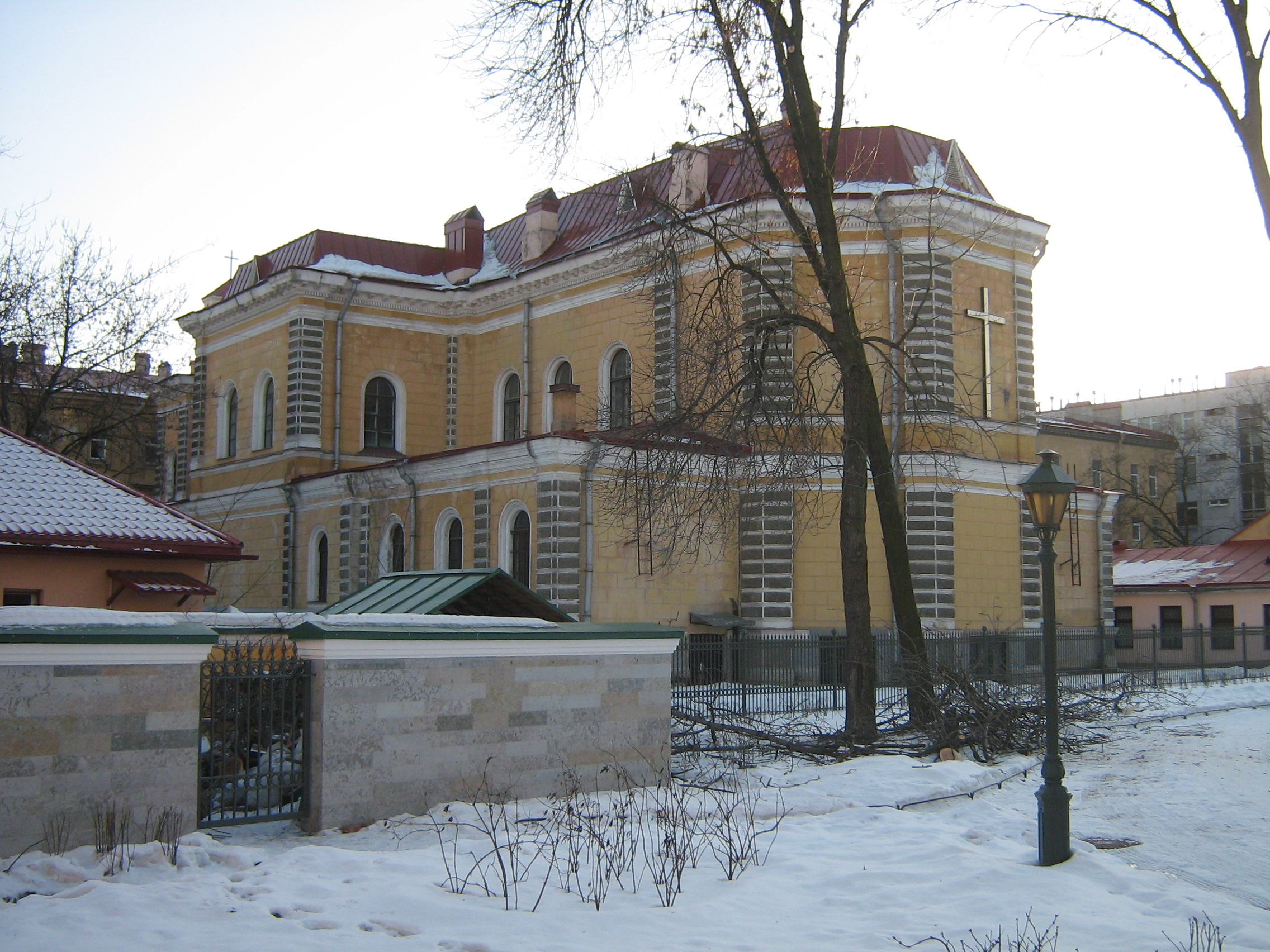
The Old Cathedral

The Cathedral has regular concerts of sacred music and is situated south of the Polish Garden.

== History ==
In 1849 the residence of the head of the Catholic Church in the Russian Empire was moved from Mogilev in Saint Petersburg, despite the fact that the Archdiocese has retained the name "Mogilev". A first seat for the Archbishop of Mogilev in St Petersburg was built in 1783 near the Church of St Stanisław. Construction of the cathedral on the territory adjacent to the new residence of the archbishop came with 1870 to 1873. The author of the original draft of the cathedral was the architect Vasily Ivanovich Sobolschikov after his death ended with the construction by architect Evgraf S. Vorotilov. Consecration of the Cathedral by Archbishop Anthony Fialkovsky held on April 12, 1873. Part of the new cathedral church plate was moved from Mogilev. To the 1890s Cathedral of the Assumption increased so that the question of its expansion. Work on its expansion took place from 1896 to 1897. Capacity of the temple has been increased from 750 to 1500 people. Side chapels were added, modified interior, updated signature. Also been replaced with side altars, in addition, they have decorated with bronze statues. On December 23, 1897 rebuilt cathedral was consecrated again. In 1900 the building arhieparchial house, located next to the cathedral, was transferred to a Catholic seminary, and the residence of the archbishop moved to a nearby house number 118 on the embankment. Assumption parish grew steadily, and before the Revolution of 1917 there were about 15 to 20 thousand members. After the October Revolution to the church of the Assumption, as well as for the Catholic Church in Russia, fell on hard times. In 1918 the seminary was closed in the 1920s government made several attempts to close and the cathedral, but managed to hold out until the arrival of 1930, when the church was finally closed. After World War II the building of the cathedral has suffered from falling bombs, were converted to the needs of the design office.

Restoration of normal activities of the Catholic Church in Russia began in the early 1990s. In 1994 was re-registered the arrival of the Assumption of the Blessed Virgin Mary. In September 1995 the church building was returned to the church, in the same year and the building was returned to the seminary, where she moved from Moscow Higher Catholic Seminary to Mary Queen of the Apostles. Extensive work on the restoration of the temple were more than two years, because on February 16, 1997 in the not yet fully restored cathedral resumed service, and on May 24, 1998, Archbishop Tadeusz Kondrusiewicz consecrated the Cathedral of the Assumption of the Blessed Virgin Mary.

== Architecture ==
The Cathedral has a shape of a Latin cross, combined with the building of a single sign seminary.
