= Church of the Immaculate Conception, Baku =

Roman Catholic cathedral in Baku, Azerbaijan

The Church of the Virgin Mary’s Immaculate Conception
- Azerbaijani: Müqəddəs Bakirə Məryəm kilsəsi; Russian: Церковь Непорочного Зачатия Пресвятой Девы Марии
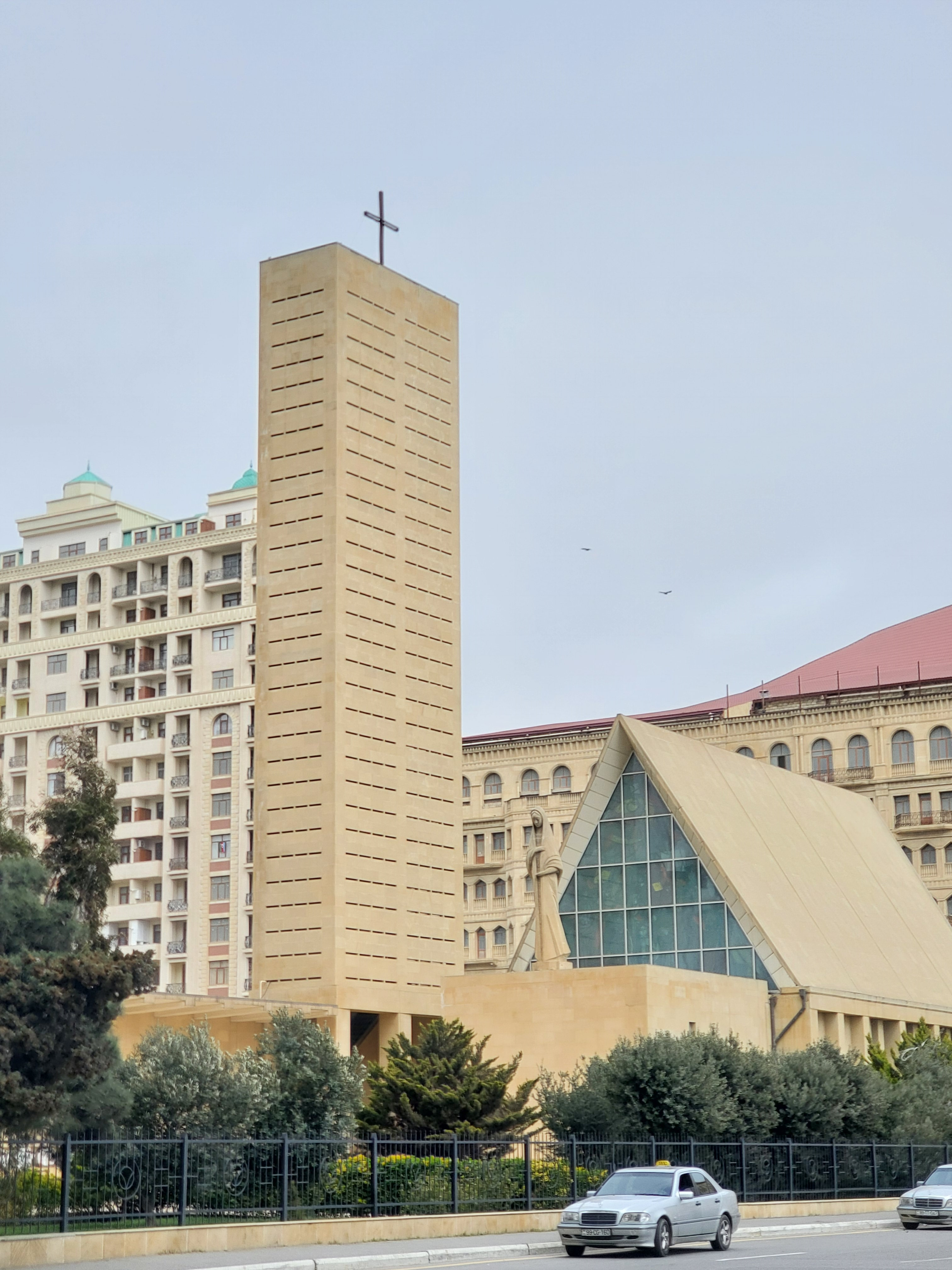
- The cathedral, in 2021
- The Church of the Virgin Mary’s Immaculate Conception
- 40°22′47″N 49°52′36″E
- Location: Orujev Street, 2A , Baku
- Country: Azerbaijan
- Denomination: Roman Catholic

History
- Status: Cathedral
- Dedication: Virgin Mary
- Consecrated: 29 April 2007

Architecture
- Functional status: Active
- Architect: Paolo Ruggiero
- Architectural type: Church
- Style: Postmodern
- Completed: 2006

Clergy
- Priest(s): Fr. Martin Bonkalo, SDB

The Church of the Virgin Mary's Immaculate Conception (Azerbaijani: Müqəddəs Bakirə Məryəm kilsəsi; Russian: Церковь Непорочного Зачатия Пресвятой Девы Марии) is a Roman Catholic church in Baku, Azerbaijan. The original church, also named Church of the Immaculate Conception operated from 1915 to 1931, when it was ordered destroyed by the Soviet government.

In 2006, a new Catholic Church bearing the same name was rebuilt in a different part of Baku. On 29 April 2007, the new church was consecrated by Apostolic Nuncio in Transcaucasia, Monsignor Claudio Gugerotti. The parish is administered by the Salesians of Don Bosco.

== History ==
In 1997, the Catholic community of Baku was re-established. In 2000, the Apostolic Prefecture of Azerbaijan was created. After Pope John Paul II's visit to Azerbaijan in 2002, it was granted land to build a new church. The cornerstone of the new church was blessed by John Paul II. The new Church of the Virgin Mary's Immaculate Conception was built in 2006, in a different spot of Baku according to the Italian architect Paolo Ruggiero's project. The church was completed in the postmodern style and the façade recalls some of the Gothic Revival style of the 1912 original church. The church was designed to have a pastoral center and a residency for priests. The statue of the Virgin Mary by local sculptors was set up over the entrance of the church which has 200 benches. The church bells were a present from Lech Kaczyński, then President of Poland. On 29 April 2007 the Apostolic Nuncio in Transcaucasia Monsignor Claudio Gugerotti administered the rite of consecration of the church. The church was dedicated on Sunday, March 7, 2008, by Cardinal Tarcisio Bertone.

== See also ==
- Roman Catholic Marian churches
- Roman Catholicism in Azerbaijan
