= Gasimov brothers =

Co-owners of a construction company in late 19th - early 20th centuries

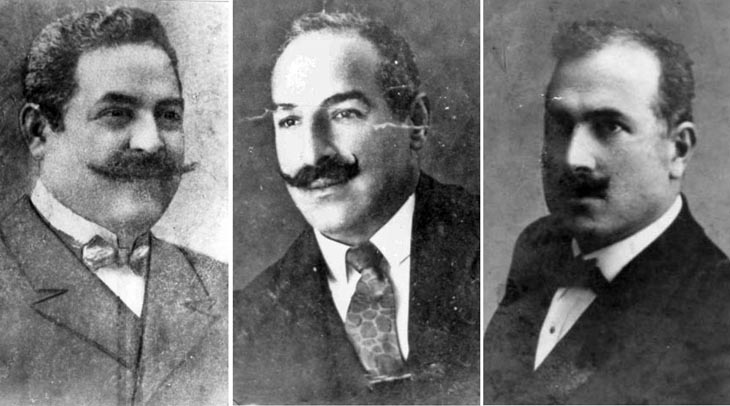
Brothers Haji, Ali and Imran

Gasimov brothers were the co-owners of the "Gasimov Brothers and Co" construction company, which carried out the construction of most of the buildings in Baku in the late 19th - early 20th centuries. The brothers built such monumental buildings as Ismailia, the Saadat Palace, the New Europe Hotel, and the Mitrofanov Palace. According to Fuad Akhundov, Gasimovs, who built most of the houses of Musa Naghiyev in Baku, carried out the construction work of all buildings raised at that time on the current streets of Istiglalliyyat, and 28 May. In addition, the brothers were involved in charity activity.

== Brothers ==
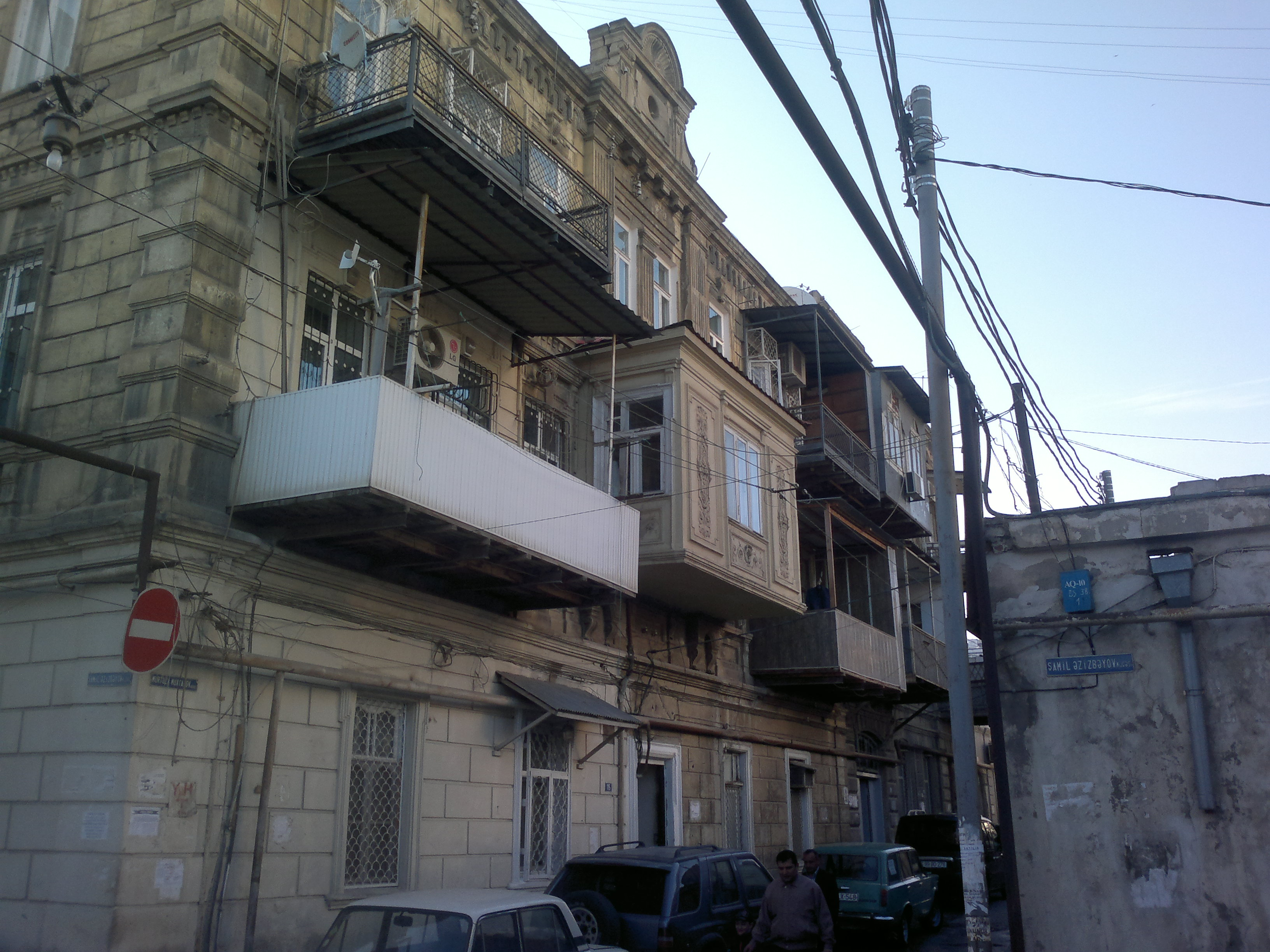
The house where the Gasimov brothers lived

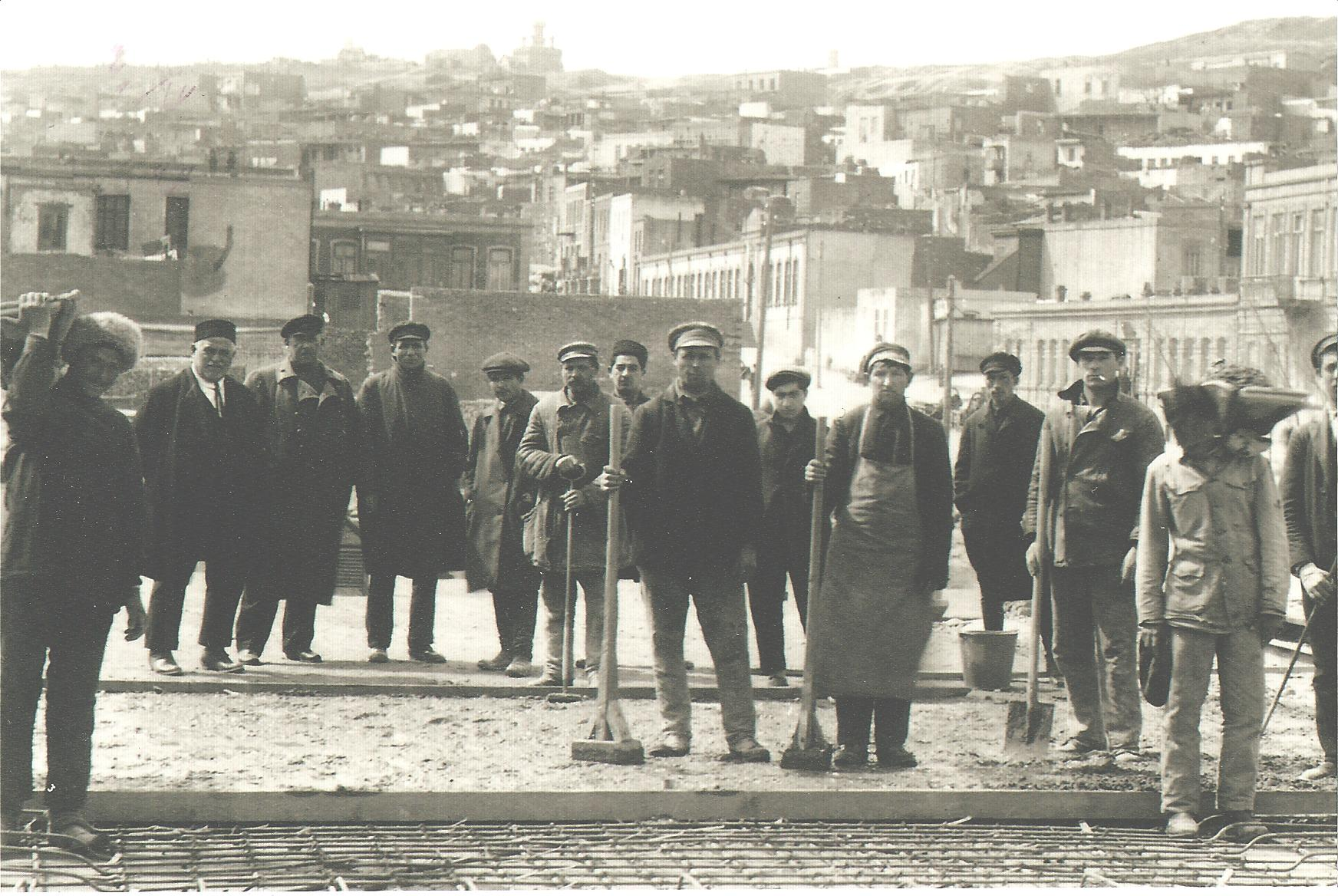
The construction of a tenement house for the Sadigov brothers. The second from left is Haji Gasimov

Gasimov brothers' father, Haji Mammad Ali Molla Gasim oghlu, owned a workshop for dyeing wool for carpets in Ordubad. The brothers came to work in Baku.

The elder brother, Haji Gasimov, was born in 1867. He started working in Baku as a simple carpenter. Soon he gathered around him the most skilful craftsmen and, together with his brothers, created a small artel, and later - a company engaged in construction works. The construction by the Gasimov brothers was carried out completely on a turnkey basis: the customer, having been familiarized with the project, only contributed with money and received the finished mansion by the appointed time. The purchase and delivery of materials, the construction work, the decoration of the facades and of the apartments - all this was undertaken by the company. Later, the brothers opened a parquet factory in Baku.

The middle brother, Ali Gasimov, was born in 1873. He was distinguished by his seriousness and calmness and was responsible for the financial issues in the company.

The younger brother, Imran Gasimov, being a very experienced contractor, was also a passionate art lover and an avid theatre-goer. He was also one of the first Azerbaijani actors. The rehearsals of the first national Azerbaijani opera "Leyli and Majnun", in 1907, were held in a large hall on the third floor of the Gasimovs' house. Imran Gasimov, a close friend of Uzeyir Hajibeyov, himself suggested this to the composer and took an active part in the preparation of the opera. Kasumov, who took on the acting pseudonym "Kengerlinsky", also played two roles in the premiere production of the opera "Leyli and Majnun" on 25 January 1908 - Leili's father, Fattah, and Mejnun's friend, Zeid. According to some reports, he also played the role of Nofel. In addition to his native language, he spoke Russian and French. He provided material support to the families of many actors. After a fire in a well-known bookstore at the intersection of Nikolaevskaya and Persidskaya streets (nowadays Istiglaliyyat and Murtuza Mukhtarov, respectively), Imran Gasimov completely took over not only its reconstruction, but also the purchase of new valuable books. Imran Gasimov died in an accident. As a contractor for the Murtuza Mukhtarov Palace under construction (nowadays the Saadat Palace), he personally supervised the installation of the statues, the decoration and the domes. During the installation on the upper tiers of the palace of a knight sculpture, which is still adorned there, he fell down. Unable to withstand the grief, his wife Rubaba khanim, poisoned herself 2 weeks later.

On 25 November 1918, a grandson is born to Haji Gasimov who is called Imran, in the memory of the tragically deceased brother of his grandfather. Years later, Imran Gasimov will become a playwright, screenwriter, People's Writer of the Azerbaijan SSR, laureate of the State Prize of the Azerbaijan SSR, and of the Order of Lenin.

== Activity ==
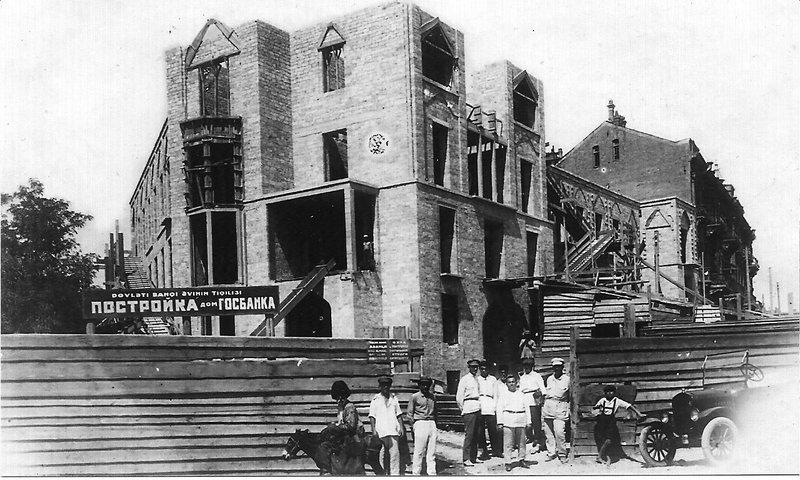
The residential building of the State Bank, built in 1926 and headed by Haji Gasimov.

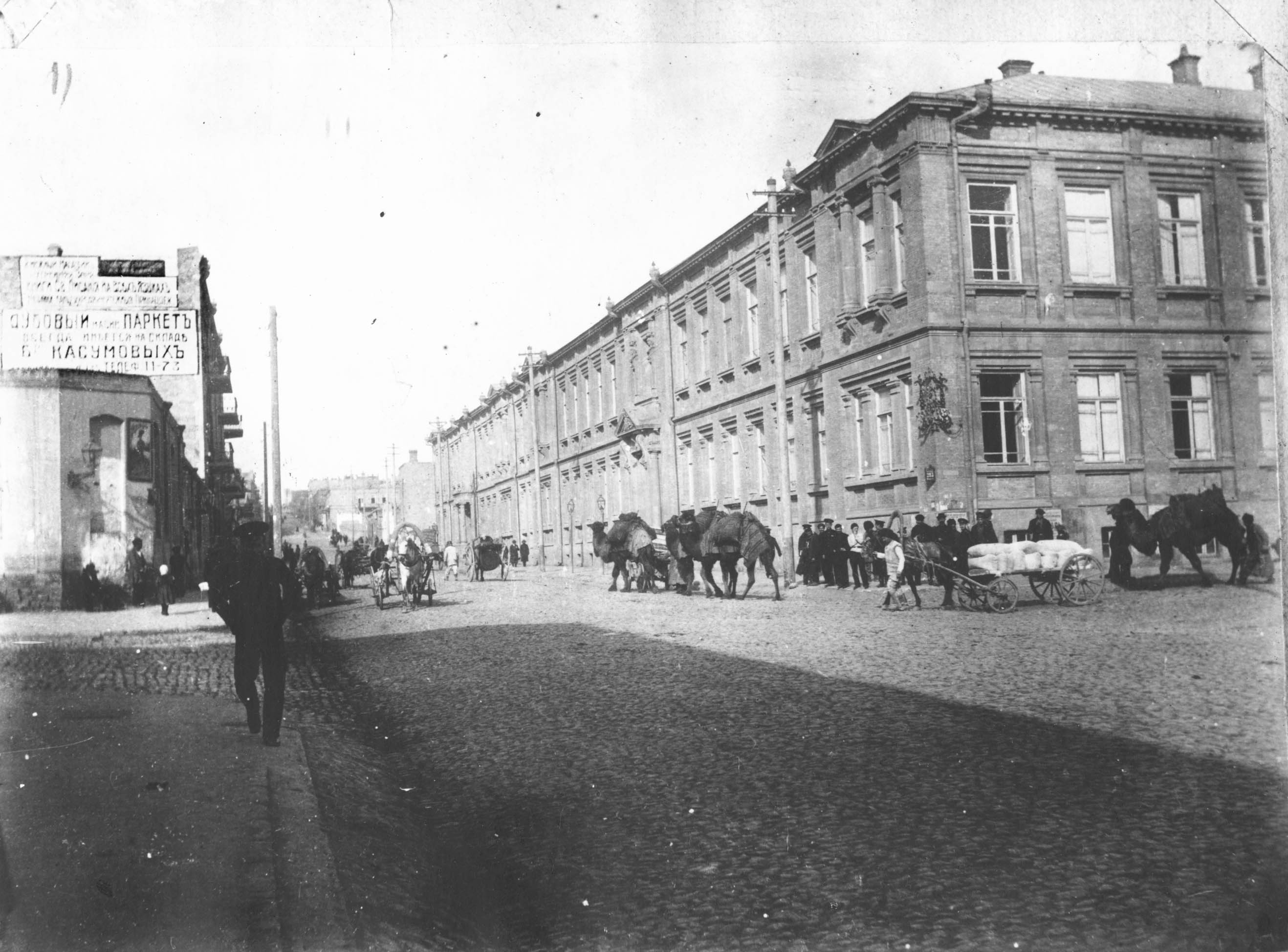
The Gasimov brothers hardware store was located in front of the Baku Technical School

The Gasimov brothers, who carried out the orders of many millionaires, can be said to have been the contractors for the construction of most of Musa Naghiyev's houses. Only in 1908–1910, they were engaged in the construction of Naghiyev's 7 tenement houses and mansions. Along with the construction of these edifices, they built a house for themselves opposite the Baku Technical School. One of the largest stores of building materials in Baku, owned by the brothers, functioned on the first floor of the building. The upper floors of it were rented out.

The Gasimov brothers, who were involved in charity activities, also assisted in the construction of the Baku Real School, from 1900 to 1904. The reason for such a long time was that the City Duma did not have enough funds to finance a large-scale project. Large Baku industrialists joined the construction, investing their money in it. Their contractors were the Gasimov brothers. When the school building was almost ready, the brothers, at their own expense, covered all three floors with magnificent oak parquet.

After the occupation of Azerbaijan by the Red Army, the property of the Gasimov brothers was confiscated, and they themselves were put under arrest. However, a few days later they were released. Later, Haji Gasimov worked as a foreman at Azneft, under his leadership many houses were built, including the dwelling house of the State Bank employees. Ali Gasimov supervised the construction of the Barda-Khankendi road. During the new economic policy years, the brothers opened a small tome plant.

== Houses built by brothers ==
The Gasimov brothers were involved in the construction of most of the houses of Musa Naghiyev, who owned about 100 buildings in Baku, as well as the main monumental buildings of the capital. According to Fuad Akhundov, the contracting office of the Gasimov brothers participated in the construction of all houses on the current streets of Istiglaliyyat, and 28 May. The list of main buildings built in Baku:

No.	Edifice	Address	Short description	Photo	Coordinates
1	Four-storey apartment building of Murtuza Mukhtarov	81 Nizami Str., Baku	Built in 1896 at the order of Mukhtarov based on the project of Johann Edel. Later, in 1910, the 4th floor was built by the architect Joseph Ploshko.		40°22′22.9712″N 49°50′25.61944″E
2	Mitrofanov Residence	3 Said Rustamov Str., Baku	Built in 1898-1903 at the order of the oil industrialist Dmitry Mitrofanov based on the project of Johann Edel. The building, built in the French neo-Renaissance style, was used by the Baku commune as a headquarter after the March 1918 events. During the period of the Azerbaijan Democratic Republic, the building housed the French Embassy. After the occupation of Azerbaijan by the Soviet troops, in April 1920, the building was divided into separate apartments.		40°22′6.11033″N 49°49′45.06933″E
3	Building of the Baku Technical School	20 Azadlig Ave., Baku	Built in 1898-1900 according to the project of the architect Joseph Goslavsky. Currently, the building houses the Azerbaijan State University of Oil and Industry.		40°22′43″N 49°50′53″E
4	Building of the Baku Real School	6 Istiglaliyyat Str., Baku	Built in 1901-1904 according to the project of the civil engineer Dmitry Buynov. Currently, the building houses the Azerbaijan State Economic University.		40°22′3.44238″N 49°49′56.07996″E
5	Gani Mammadov Residence	45 Asef Zeynally Str., Baku	The construction of the house began in 1908 at the order of the cotton merchant, owner of sea vessels Gani Mammadov.The large residence, designed by the architect Nikolai Baev, was built in just one year. After the Soviet occupation of Azerbaijan in 1920, the house was empty for several years. Later, it was occupied by government agencies, and then by a kindergarten, later the first and second floors were divided into numerous apartments. This led to the destruction of the building's interior.		40°21′54″N 49°50′7″E
6	Ismailiyya Palace	10 Istiglaliyyat Str., Baku	Built in the Gothic style in 1908–1913 at the order of Musa Naghiyev in the honour of his son Ismail. The author of the project was the architect Joseph Ploshko. Originally, the building housed the Muslim Benevolent Society. During the March 1918, the building was burnt down by Armenians. In 1923, under the direction of the architect Alexander Dubov, the building was restored. Currently, the Presidium of the National Academy of Sciences of Azerbaijan is located there.		40°22′6.80995″N 49°50′1.6489″E
7	Baku Commercial School	39 Zarifa Aliyeva Str., Baku	Built in 1909–1914, during the times of the Azerbaijan Democratic Republic, the building housed the first higher educational institution of Azerbaijan - Baku State University. Nowadays, the Azerbaijan State Pedagogical University operates there.		40°22′22.02742″N 49°50′53.8186″E
8	Three-storey apartment building of Murtuza Mukhtarov	25 Rashid Behbudov Str., Baku	Built in 1910 by the architect Joseph Ploshko in the style of the Italian Renaissance at the order of Murtuza Mukhtarov.		40°22′46.7653″N 49°50′37.82774″E
9	House of Sadykhov brothers	21 Istiglaliyyat Str., Baku	In 1909, an all-Russian competition for the design of the house was announced. As the first project was recognized the one of Gabriel Ter-Mikelov. The edifice was built in the style of the national romantic architecture in 1910–1912. During the Azerbaijan Democratic Republic times, Fatali khan Khoysky and Nasib bey Yusifbeyli lived in this house. After the occupation of Azerbaijan by the Soviet troops in April 1920, the building housed the Central Executive Committee of the Azerbaijan SSR.		40°21′51″N 49°49′50″E
10	Building of the Baku Public Assembly	2 Istiglaliyyat Str., Baku	Built in 1910-1912 according to the project of the civil engineer Gabriel Ter-Mikelov on the territory later called the Philharmonic Garden. Since 1936, the building houses the State Philharmonic.		40°21′50.71999″N 49°49′54.662″E
11	Four-storey tenement house of Musa Naghiyev	47 Khagani Str., Baku	Built in 1910-1912 by the architect Joseph Ploshko.		40°22′32.29047″N 49°51′4.5226″E
12	Palace of Happiness	6 Murtuza Mukhtarov Str., Baku	The Saadat Palace or the Mukhtarov Palace was built in 1911–1912 at the order of Murtuza Mukhtarov for his wife. The author of the project was the architect Iosif Ploshko. After the Soviet occupation during the so-called "robbery week" the Red Army soldiers broke into Mukhtarov's house with the aim of robbery. Unable to withstand such an attitude, Mukhtarov killed two Red Army marauders with a revolver, and fired a third bullet into his temple. Subsequently, the building housed the Ali Bayramov Women's Turkic School, the Shirvanshahs Museum and the Wedding Palace. In the building, renovated in 2012, the Wedding Palace continues to function nowadays.		40°22′7.03571″N 49°49′54.08992″E
13	Building of the hotel "New Europe"	13 Haji Zeynalabdin Taghiyev Str., Baku	Built in 1910–1913 in the Art Nouveau style at the order of Agha Musa Naghiyev. It was equipped with 4 lifts, sanitary equipment, steam heating, power grid. The author of the project is the architect Joseph Ploshko.		40°22′11.61743″N 49°50′20.21423″E

== See also ==
- Johann Edel
- Józef Płoszko

== Literature ==
- Aliyev, Elchin (2010). Bakı memarlıq abidələrində fasad heykəltəraşlıq nümunələri: XIX əsrin sonu-XX əsrin əvvəlləri=Facade sculptures in Baku: XIX and early XX c (PDF). Bakı. p. 320. ISBN 978-9952-8026-89.
- Aliyev, Elchin (2011). Məkanların astanasında Bakı tarixini yazan qapılar: 1867-1913 / Baku Doors and Entrance Halls: 1867-1913 (PDF). Baku. p. 379. ISBN 978-9952-8033-27.
- Fatullayev, Shamil (2013a). XIX əsr - XX əsrin əvvəllərində Azərbaycanda şəhərsalma və memarlıq / Urban planning and architecture in Azerbaijan in the XIX - early XX centuries (PDF). Baku: Şərq-Qərb. p. 480. ISBN 978-9952-32-020-6. Archived from the original (PDF) on 2021-08-30.
- Fatullayev, Shamil (2013b). Bakının memarlıq ensiklopediyası / Baku architectural encyclopedia (PDF). Bakı: Şərq-Qərb. p. 528. ISBN 978-9952-32-020-6. Archived from the original (PDF) on 2021-06-24.
- Fatullayev, Shamil (2013c). Bakı memarları XIX əsrin sonu - XX əsrin əvvəlində / Baku architects in the late XIX - early XX centuries (PDF). Bakı: Şərq-Qərb. p. 296. ISBN 978-9952-32-020-6. Archived from the original (PDF) on 2021-01-11.
