= Alexander Dubov =

Azerbaijani architect

Azerbaijani: Aleksandr Dubov Russian: Дубов Александр Яковлевич
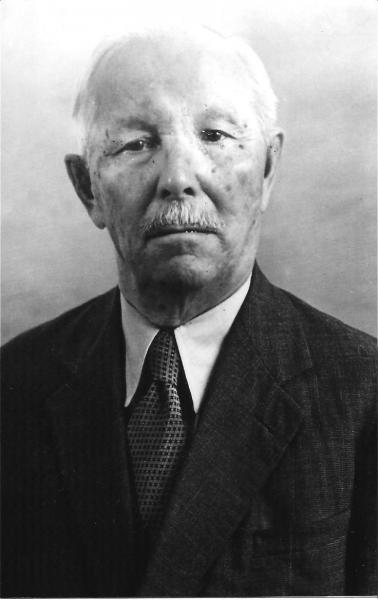
- Born: 1877; Helsinki
- Died: 1964; Baku
- Occupation: Architect

Alexander Yakovlevich Dubov was a builder and architect who worked in Baku from 1904 until the end of his life, where he participated in the construction of a number of monumental buildings in the city. He was also engaged in the restoration of some houses, in particular, in 1922–1923, the Ismailiyya Palace, burned down during the March Days of 1918.

== Biography ==
The civil engineer Alexandr Yakovlevich Dubov was born in 1877 in Helsinki. He lived and worked in Finland, which at that time was part of the Russian Empire. After graduating from the high school, he entered the School of Construction Foremen in St. Petersburg, then he continued his studies at the Technical School in Finland.

He began his professional activity in Russia, in 1900, in St. Petersburg, at construction of the Polytechnic Institute facilities. Here, he also collaborated with French specialists who were introducing reinforced concrete in Russia at that time, and he gained a lot of experience in this direction. In 1902–1904, he built a palace in Gagra, on the estate of the Duke Alexander of Oldenburg, the husband of the younger sister of the Emperor Nicholas II, Olga Alexandrovna. During the Soviet times, the palace was turned into the sanatorium "Ritsa". As a token of gratitude for the successful work on the palace's construction, the Prince of Oldenburg awarded Alexandr Dubov with a silver personalized cigarette case.

At the opening of the palace in Gagra, Dubov was introduced to the famous Baku industrialist Haji Zeynalabdin Tagiyev, who having heeded the recommendations of the Duke Alexander of Oldenburg that highly appreciated the skill of the builder, told Dubov about the perspectives of the urban construction in Baku, and offered him work and help in organizing the construction activity. Alexandr Yakovlevich accepted the offer of H. Z. Tagiyev and in 1904 moved with his family from St. Petersburg to Baku. From that moment on, his work and life were associated with Baku.

The first work on reinforced concrete floors in Baku was carried out by Dubov in the Tagiyev Passage building. The customer did not believe in the reinforced concrete structure and therefore signed a contract with the architect for the restoration of the building within 5 days and the compensation for damages was established three times higher the amount in case of its destruction. Later, Alexandr Dubov worked as a specialist in reinforced concrete, then as the head of construction at the "Kayalov" firm, at the same time designing in the studio of the architect T.M.Ter-Mikelov. Subsequently, he became his deputy and co-author of a number of objects.

After the Soviet occupation, he was engaged in the construction of the State Bank Residential House (house of the bank employees) in Baku in 1926–1927, the State Bank building, a sanatorium in Mardakan, he also took part in the restoration of the Ismailiyya Palace. Dubov worked until he was 80 years old. He died in 1964 in Baku.

Two sons of Alexandr Yakovlevich - Victor and Dmitry also became architects.

== Works ==
During 1904–1918, the creative community - T.M.Ter-Mikelov, A.Y.Dubov and Haji Gasimov, designed, received contracts and carried out construction. H. Gasimov was involved in the organization of work, contracts, provision of materials. The organized community turned out to be very fruitful.

The houses designed and built in 1904-1918:

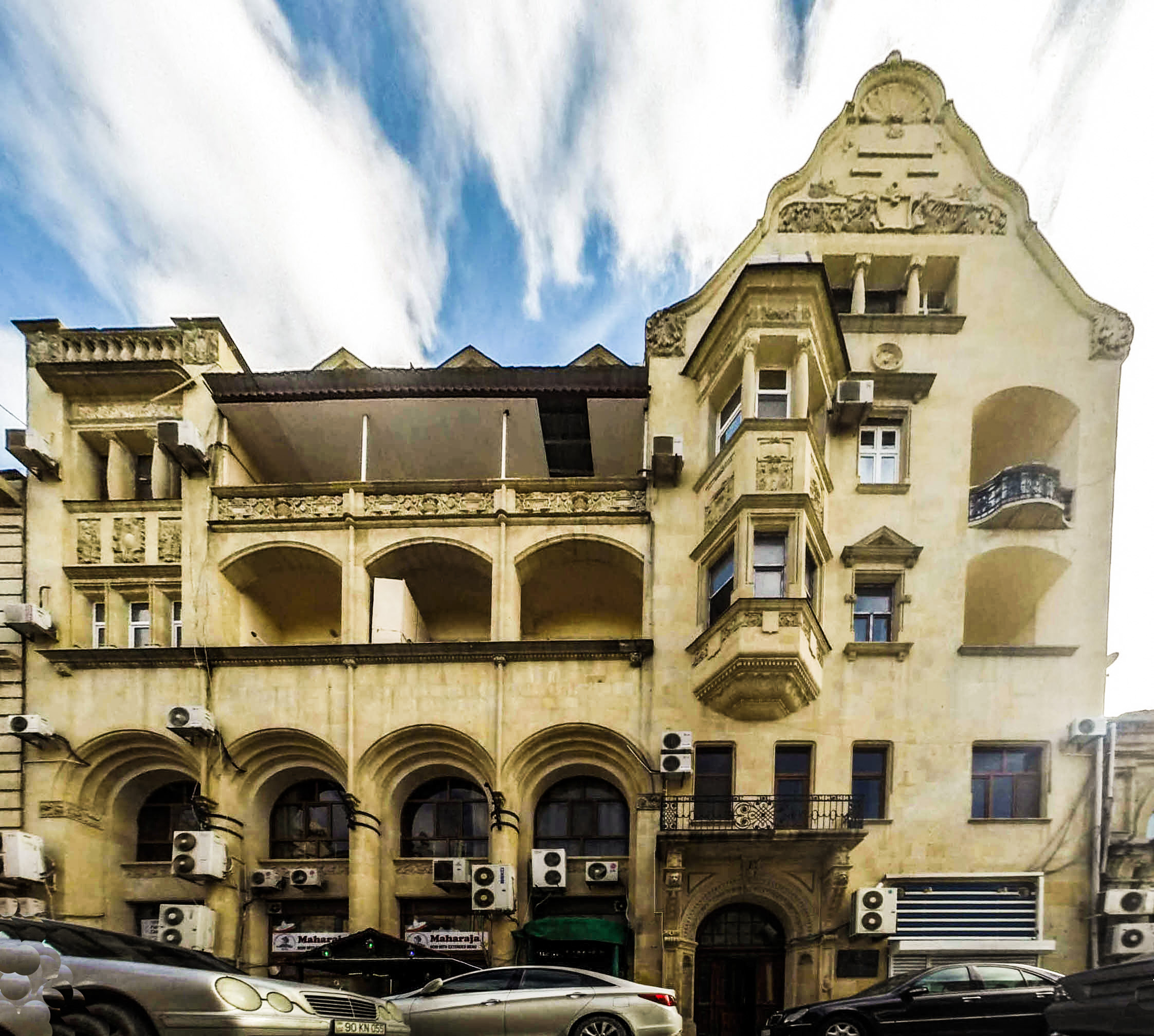
House of the Adamov brothers, 1908–1909

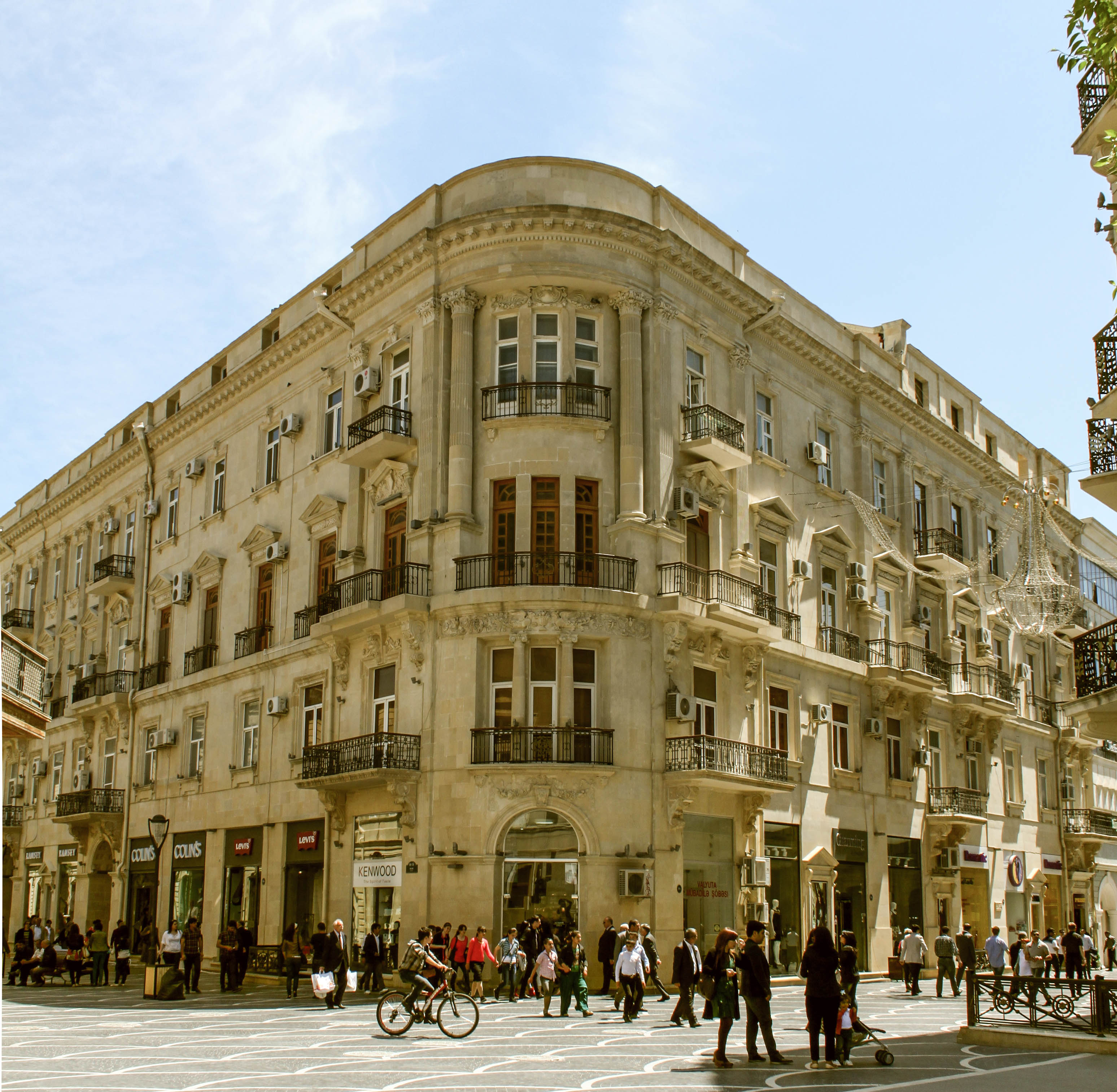
House of the Tagiyev brothers, 1909–1911

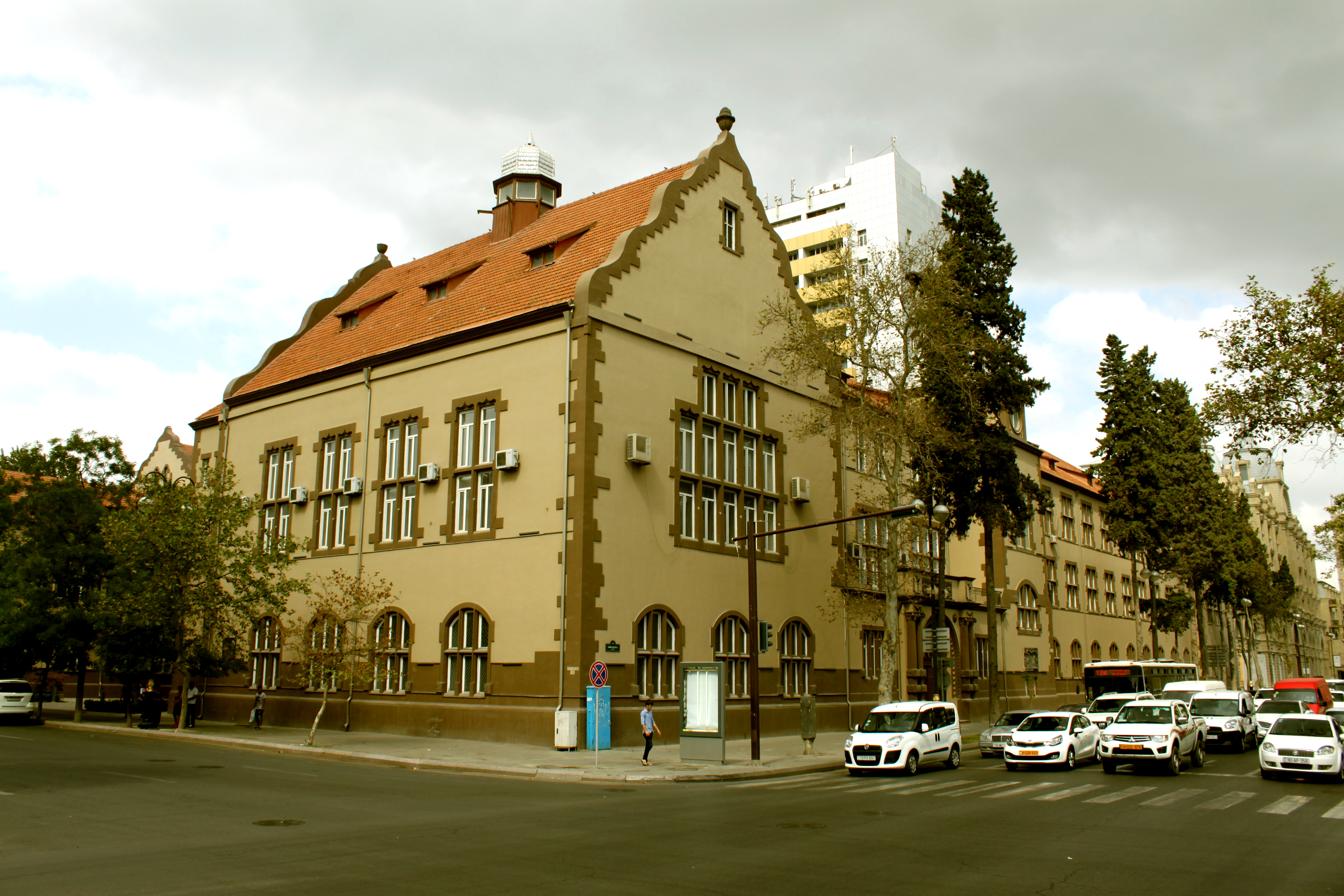
Baku Commercial School, 1909–1914

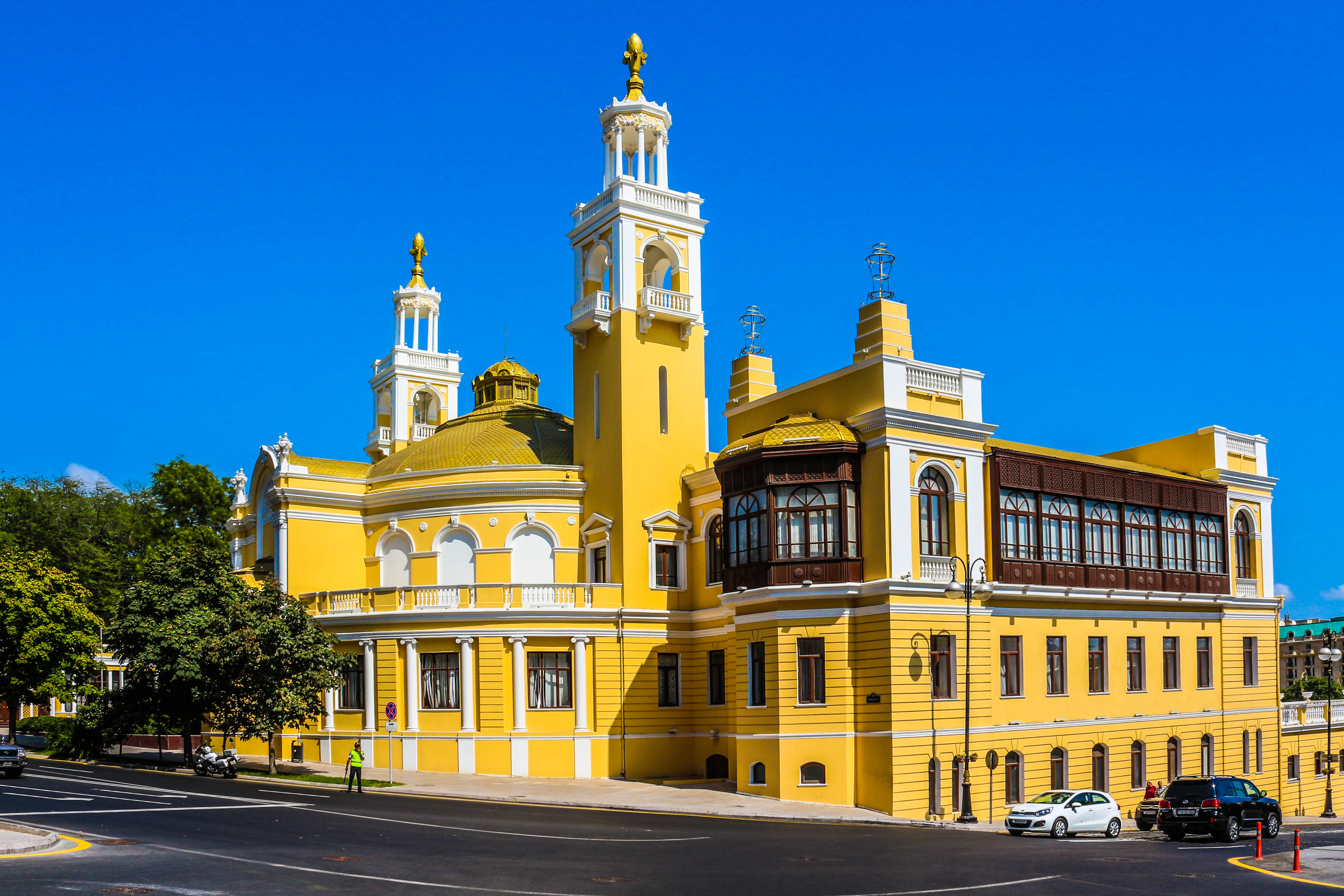
Azerbaijan State Academic Philharmonic, 1911–1914

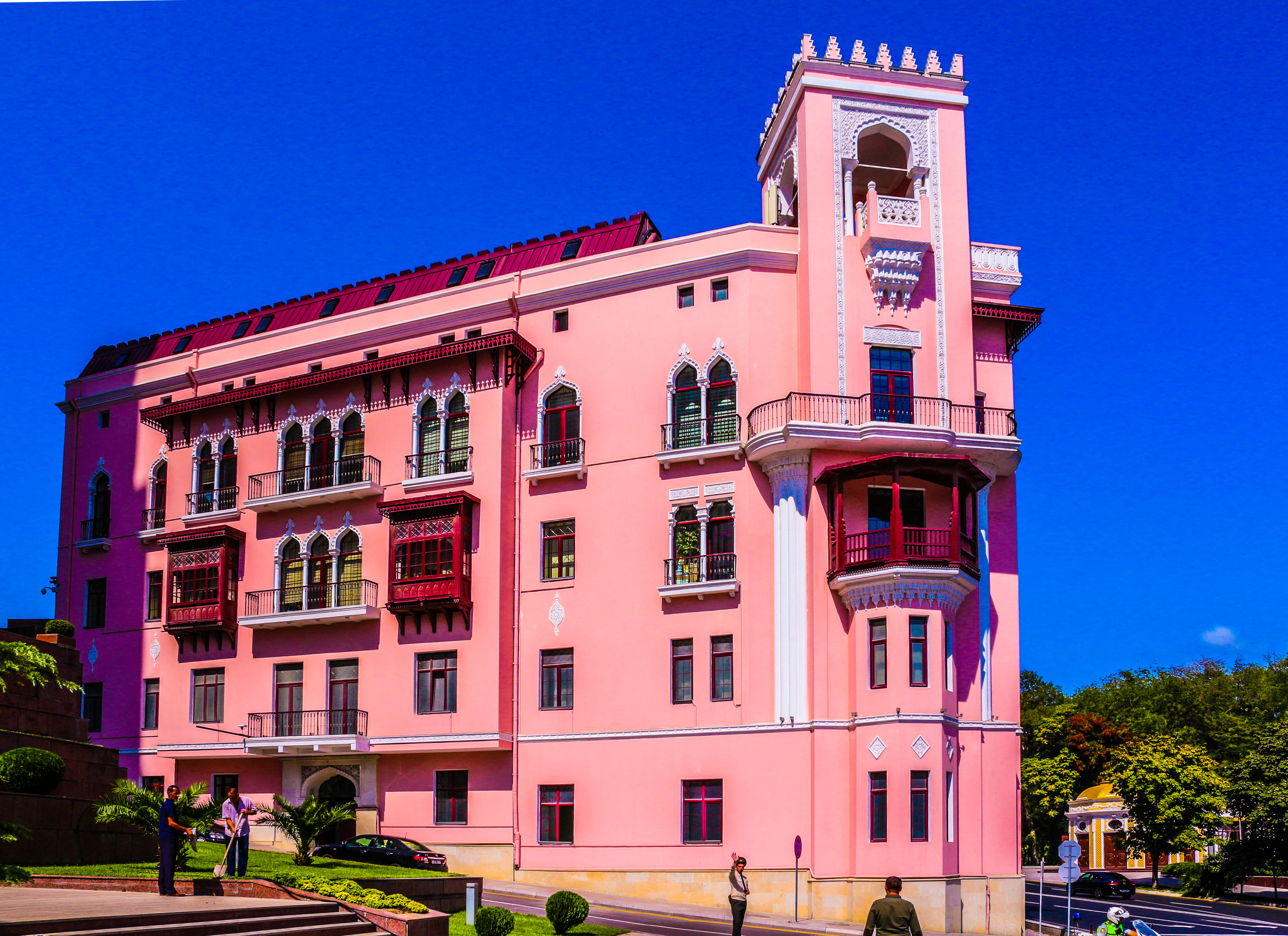
House of the Sadikhov brothers, 1911–1914

== See also ==
- Mikayil Huseynov
- Józef Płoszko
- Gasim bey Hajibababeyov
