= Nizami Street =

Street in Baku, Azerbaijan

Coordinates: 40.372944°N 49.840395°E

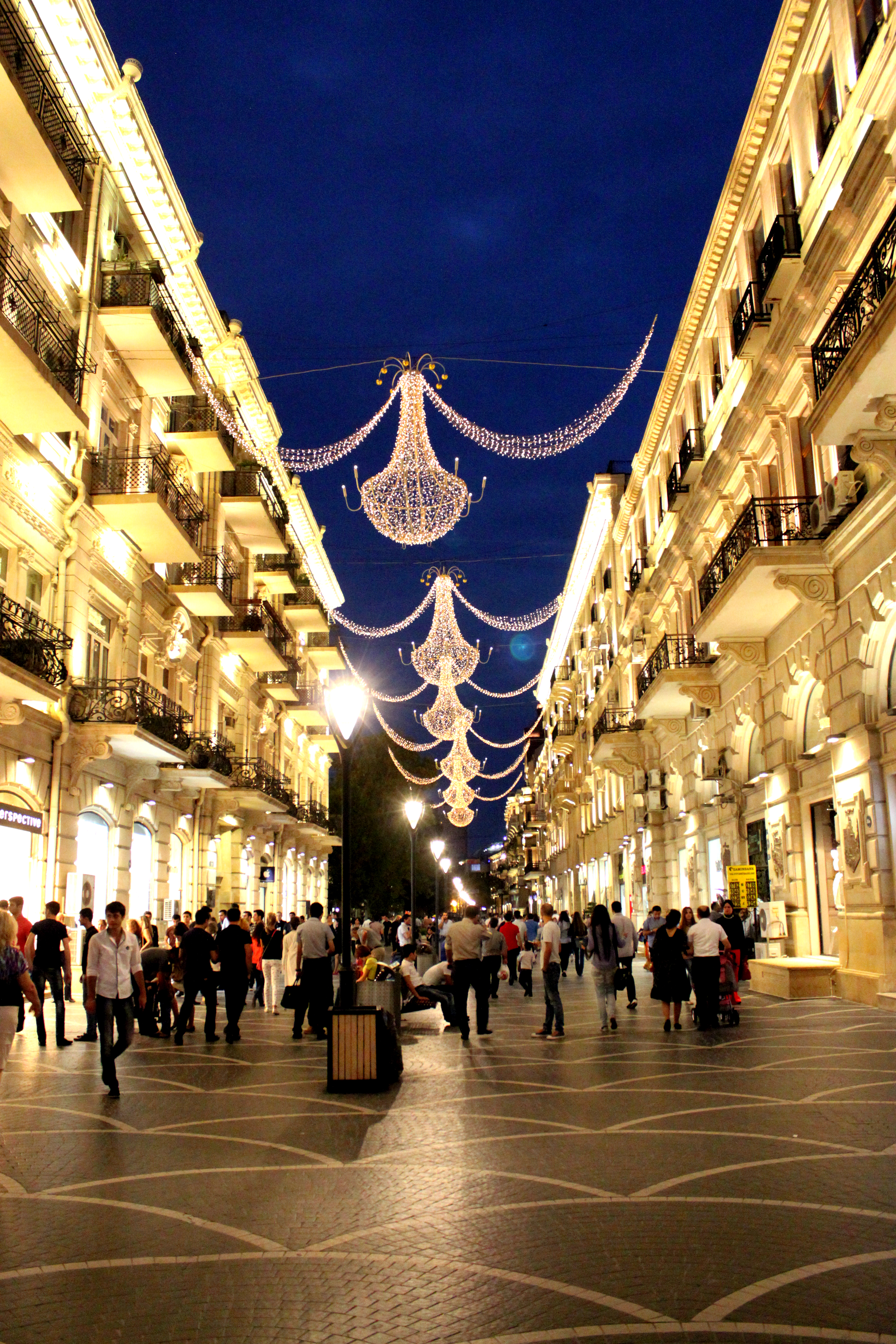
- Nizami Street at night
- Interactive map of Nizami Street
- Native name: Nizami küçəsi (Azerbaijani)
- Former names: Torgovaya; Fuzûlî (1925–1962); Krasnopresnenskaya (1939–1940)
- Length: 2.198 mi (3.537 km)
- Location: Baku, Azerbaijan
- Postal code: 1001
- From: Abdulla Shaig Street
- To: Sabit Orujov Street

Nizami Street (Azerbaijani: Nizami küçəsi), commonly known as Tarqovu or Tarqovi (from Russian: торговый), is a large pedestrian and shopping street in downtown Baku, Azerbaijan, named after the classical Azerbaijani poet Nizami Ganjavi.

== Overview ==
The street's history can be traced back to Baku's urban planning project of 1864. The street runs through the city's downtown from west to east. It begins at Abdulla Shaig Street, in the mountainous part of the city, and ends at the railway bed on Sabit Orujov Street, near a monument to Shah Ismail Khatai in the area known as “Black City”. The total length of the street is 3,538 metres.

The traffic-free segment, which begins at Fountains Square and ends at Rashid Behbudov Street, is commonly known as Torgovaya ("the merchant street" in Russian).

Nizami Street is home to various outlets, from banks to fashion stores, and is one of the most expensive streets in the world. The street also hosts the embassies of Germany, Norway, the Netherlands and Austria, as well as the European Union Delegation to Azerbaijan. The nearest metro stations are Sahil (red line, south of Nizami Street) and 28 May (both red and green lines, north of the street).

== History ==
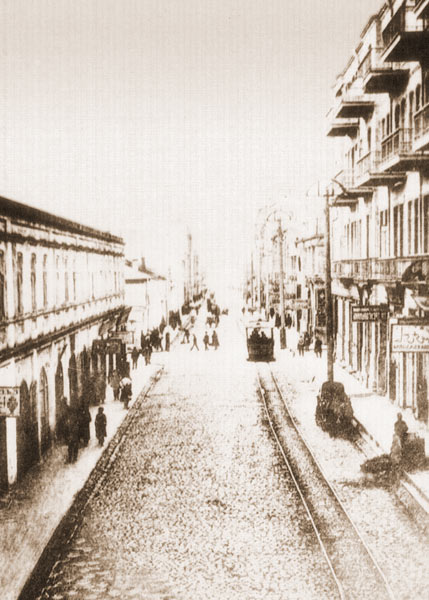
Torgovaya in the beginning of the 20th century

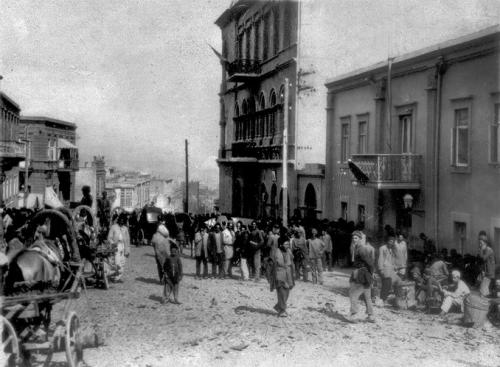
Gubernskaya Street in 1913 and Rothschilds' office building (right), (Nizami 20)

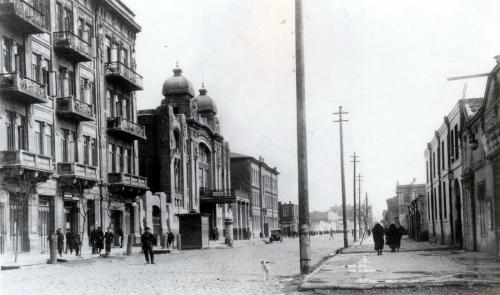
Building of opera in 1914

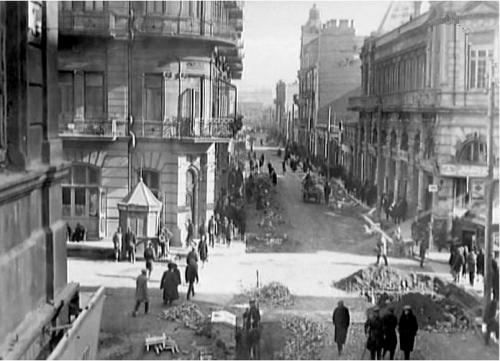
Torgovaya (corner of Gogol Street) in 1930

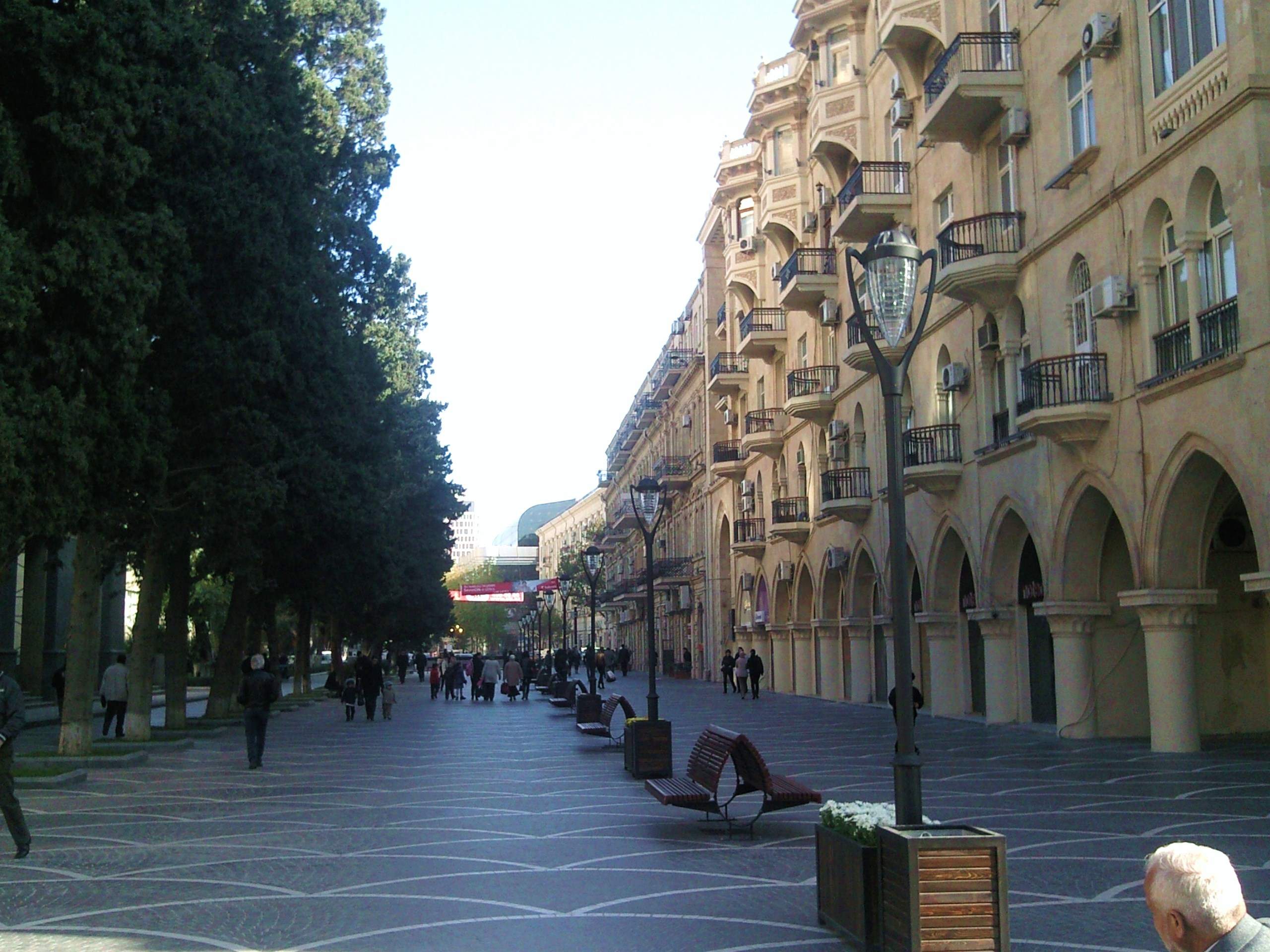
Torgovaya in the present day

In 1859, a strong earthquake hit Shamakhi, which led to the dissolution of the Shamakhi Governorate and the establishment of the Baku Governorate with its center in Baku. After Baku became the governorate, the city began to undertake ambitious construction projects.

In the first years after the 1859 decree was signed, the population of Baku began to rise. New caravanserais were being constructed along the northern part of the fortress walls, each occupying a whole quarter, with trading rows and stores. Subsequently, this part of the city became the central trading area, making it necessary to develop a cohesive construction plan.

This task was entrusted to Gasim bey Hajibababeyov and a group of engineers and architects from Saint Petersburg. According to the group, construction of new highways radiating from Icheri Sheher fortress in all directions was the focus of their urban planning. Their design philosophy is reflected in the first governorate urban plan of Baku, created in 1864.

Initially, Nizami Street was called “Torgovaya Street” because of its status as a trade center. Later, in 1879, it was officially renamed “Gubernskaya Street”, but citizens still called it “Torgovaya”.

The street began at Mariinskaya Street (later Korganov Street, now Rasul Rza Street), where multi-storey houses belonging to wealthy residents were located, and extended to the area known as “Black City”, where oil wells and other industrial developments were situated.

The late 19th century was characterized by rapid economic development in the city and a second massive influx of migrants from other governorates of the Russian Empire, caused by the development of new oil wells on the Absheron Peninsula. Marine infrastructure was also developed, and the general plan of the Fortress Vorstadt (suburb) and the marine port was significantly expanded. The city eventually became one of southern Russia's most significant trading hubs.

The rapid economic growth of Baku attracted affluent industrialists who began constructing new buildings. Many buildings along the street were constructed by oil magnates such as Musa Naghiyev, Shamsi Asadullayev and Murtuza Mukhtarov, and were designed by prominent architects such as N.A. von der Nonne, M. Gafar Ismayilov, A. Hajibababeyov, K.B. Surkevich, J.V. Goslavski, Józef Plośko, Zivar bey Ahmadbeyov, E. Edel and G. Termikelov.

In 1868, the Araz Cinema was built by architect M.Gafar Ismayilov on a deserted territory adjoining Nizami Street. A year later, in 1869, St. Gregory the Illuminator's Church was built nearby.

In 1880, two two-storey residential houses (Nizami 52 and 54), which helped define the geometry and spatial layout of the street, were constructed at the right side of the street, between Prachechnaya and Mariinskaya Streets.

In 1888, a photo studio of A. Mishon was located on this street in the “Imperial” hotel. Another photography studio, owned by David Rostamyan, was located in a two-storey mansion on the corner of Torgovaya and Mariinskaya Streets. Numerous small shops, groceries, confectioner's shops and florists, and some of the most prestigious hotels of the city – “Bolshaya Moskovskaya”, “Imperial”, “London” and “Severnie Nomera” – were located in this part of the city.

In 1896, a three-storey apartment house (Nizami 79) was built on the corner of Prachechnaya Street (later Gogol, now Mardanov Qardashlari Street) by architect I.V. Edel, for the oil magnate Murtuza Mukhtarov. In 1910, a new storey was added by architect Jozef Ploshko, giving the building a semi-circular façade and a circular dome.

Millionaire Haji Rajabli's house, now the “Vatan” cinema (Nizami 75, 77) was constructed on the left side of Torgovaya between Mariinskaya and Prachechnaya Streets. On the opposite side was a building owned by Mirza Taghiyev, a merchant from Shamakhi, where a popular shop belonging to the German confectioner Zeitz was located.

In 1899, a one-storey building of the “Baku branch of Russian Imperial Technical Union” (Nizami 115) was built on Millionnaya Street (later Darwin, Voroshilov Streets, now Fikret Amirov Street). Today, one of the buildings of the Azerbaijan State Oil Academy is located there. An office building for the Rothschild brothers (Nizami 20) was built on the corner of Persidskaya Street (later Polukhina, now Nurtuza Mukhtarov Street) according to designs by civil engineer K.B. Surkevich. In 1918 and the 1920s, the consulate of the Netherlands was located in this house.

In 1902, a two-storey residential house was built on the corner of Vokzalnaya Street by the architect I.V. Edel. In the 1960s, the third storey was added to the building.

In 1904, a mill was constructed at the intersection with Vokzalnaya Street (now Pushkin Street) for millionaire and philanthropist Haji Zeynalabdin Taghiyev.

In 1910, a synagogue building, where the State Theatre of Song named after Rashid Behbudov (Nizami 76) is now located, was constructed according to the design of architect J.V. Goslavskiy at the south-eastern intersection of Torgovaya and Kaspiyskaya Streets (later Schmidt, now Rashid Behbudov Street).

In 1911, an operetta building, now housing the Azerbaijan State Academic Opera and Ballet Theater (Nizami 95), was constructed at the intersection by order of industrialist Mayilov and designed by G. Termikelov and N. Bayev.

In the same year, an apartment house near the building of the operetta (Nizami 93) and a four-storey residential house on the corner of Mariinskaya Street (Nizami 48), known as “Naghiyev’s house”, were designed and constructed by architect Jozef Ploshko for Musa Naghiyev. This house is considered one of the best creations of Jozef Ploshko.

A house where the Nobel Prize laureate academician Lev Landau was born in 1924 was constructed on the corner of Krasnovodskaya Street (later Krasnoarmeyskaya, now Samad Vurgun Street).

In 1912, on the other side of the crossroad with Mariinskaya Street, a four-storey apartment house (Nizami 50) was constructed according to the design of architects G.Termikelov and Haji Gasimov for the Taghiyev brothers.

In 1925, the street was renamed to Fuzuli Street in honour of the 16th-century Azerbaijani poet Mahammad Fuzuli and retained this name until 1962, with brief interruptions from 1939 to 1940, when the street was renamed Krasnopresnenskaya Street. Since 1962, the street has been called Nizami Street.

In 1932–1934, a complex of buildings of the State Bank of the Azerbaijan SSR (Nizami 87 and 89) was constructed on the corner of Torgovaya and Bolshaya Morskaya Streets (later Kirov Avenue, now Bul-Bul Avenue), according to designs by A. Dubov.

In 1949, two residential houses known as the “oilmen’s houses” (Nizami 66 and 83), designed by architects Mikayil Huseynov and Sadig Dadashov, were built at the intersection near “Landau’s house”. German prisoners of war captured during the Great Patriotic War were used as labour in the construction of these buildings.

In 1952–1954, a “General Development Plan of the City for a Period up to 1976” was developed by the staff of the State Project Institution. According to this plan, residential houses that used constructivist design elements were constructed in the area of the State Bank extending to the intersection with Richard Sorge Street.

In 1966, a new “Nasimi” park named after the prominent Azerbaijani poet of the 14th century Imadaddin Nasimi, was laid out on the corner of Nizami and Samad Vurgun Streets. In 1978, on the eve of celebration of the 600th anniversary of the poet, a monument to the poet was installed in the center of the park, a sculpture of which was made of bronze and installed on a granite pedestal. In 2008, a reconstruction of the park began.

== Architecture ==
The architecture of the street reflects a synthesis of various styles and directions, which is because, the intensive construction and building was realized in three main levels: late 19th-early 20th century, 1950s–1970s and a modern period.

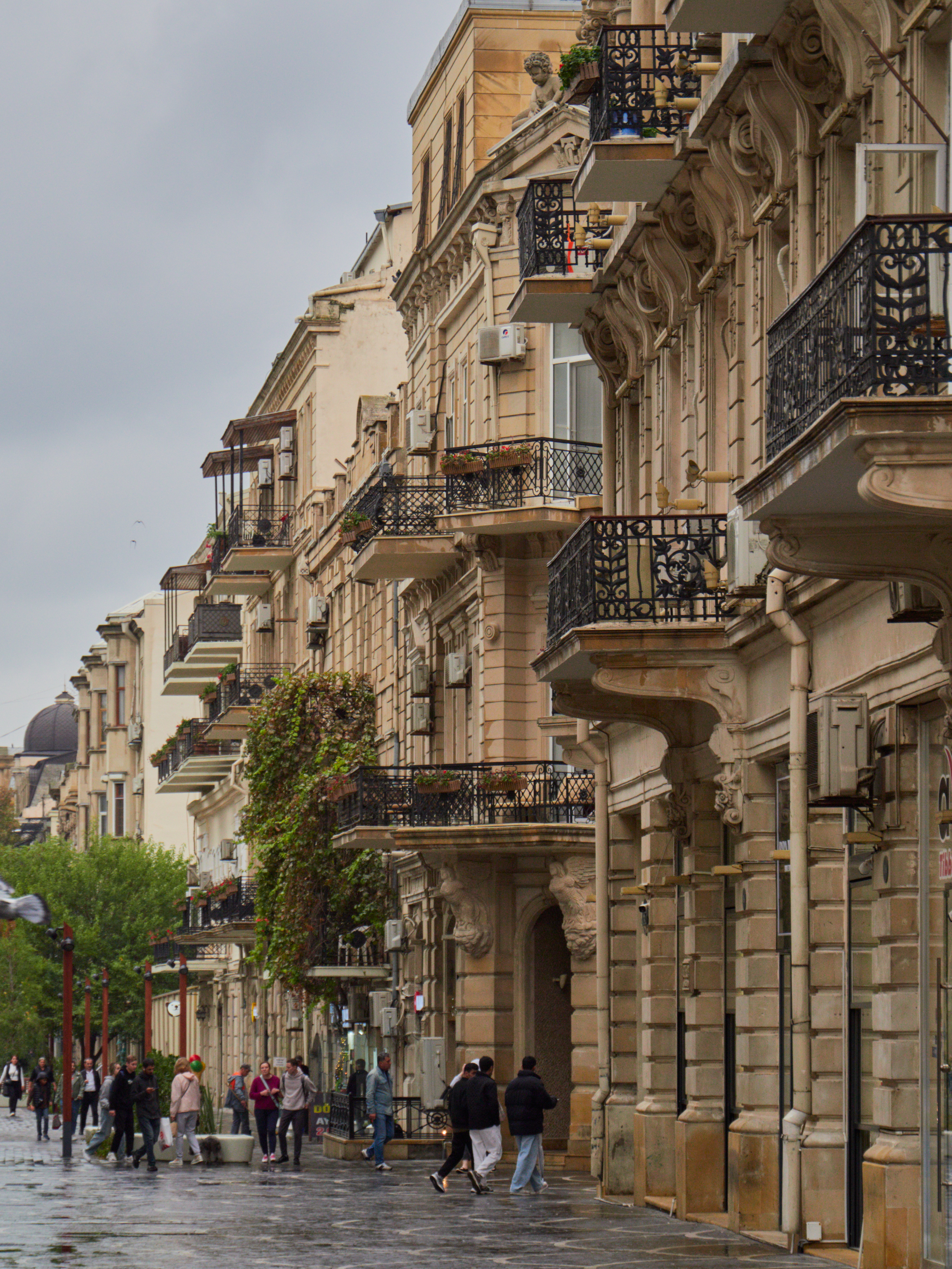
Nizami Street, lined with ornate neoclassical residential buildings

Most of the buildings, constructed in the first level, were constructed in “neo-renaissance”, “neo-gothic”, “baroque” and “neoclassicism” styles as other buildings of the city constructed in that period. “Neo-Moorish” style also dominates, in which architects attempted to use elements of national architecture in its construction. Houses are dressed with limestone – aglay. The first level could be divided into three territories of construction: the first – between Vorontsov Street (now Islam Safarli Street) and Persian Street (now M.Muktarov Street), where were located the most ancient buildings constructed by the projects of N.A.von der Nonne and M.Gafar Ismayilov, the second – from a territory, adjoined from Taza Pir Mosque to the South which was a complex of one and two storeyed buildings, the third to the side of railway station, and namely in the third zone, at the turn of the 19th century-beginning of the 20th century, began to be constructed more significant three and four storeyed buildings by the projects of Jozef Ploshko and I.V.Goslavski.

The second level of the architectural development of the street is connected to intrusion of new buildings in the middle of the 20th century, which were implemented in “empire” or so called “Stalin’s empire” style, known today as Stalinist architecture. Later, in the end of 1950s were constructed residential houses, many of which were projected and constructed in a new artistic architectural style which was widely spread in a lot countries of the world and which was known as “constructivism”. According to art critics H.F.Mammadov, architectural style of constructivism was shown fully and manifold almost in Baku in the whole USSR, where it was used for giving the city a new character. Enthusiasm for constructivism in Baku resulted in the creation of a local variety – “constructivism of Baku”. As in earlier constructions, the architects introduced eastern and national tints, which are especially felt in implementation of arches and monograms of the buildings, which significantly changes the total stylistic appearance of these buildings and façade of the building is dressed with aglay.

Modern constructions, especially skyscrapers, are constructed in “neo-modern” style, dressed with alucobond, fiber-reinforced concrete, marble and granite. According to specialists, two buildings, located in this street, are distinguished from other buildings of the street for their style. These are – the building of the Azerbaijan State Theatre of Young Spectators (Nizami 72) which is too massive for the architectural ensemble of this part of the street and doesn't harmonize with a classic style of the architecture by which are represented the nearest houses and it breaks the total geometry of the territory, and the building of the State Committee on Capital Issues (Nizami 87/89), architectural resolution of which is implemented in “constructivism” style and spoils “classical” monumentalism of the street's perimeter.

== Historical landmarks ==
House number	Image	Details
20		The building of Caspian—Black Sea Oil and Trade Society (built in 1898–1899).
30		The building of Central Universal Magazine in Baku.
34/0		The building of "Nargiz" shopping center (left).
38		The building of the Central Library under the President Administration of Azerbaijan.
38/0		The building of the St. Gregory the Illuminator Armenian Church (built in 1869).
48		Northern facade of Musa Naghiyev's house (at right), built in 1911.
50		Neoclassical apartments of Tagiyev brothers, built in 1912.
56		A residential house constructed by architect I.V.Edel, in 1902.
58		A residential house constructed by architect I.V.Edel, in 1890.
61		A residential house (built in 2006).
64		The house, built in 1911, where Lev Landau was born and lived.
66		Oilmen's house built in 1956 by Mikayil Huseynov.
67,69		"ISR Plaza" office center and the building of the International Bank of Azerbaijan.
72		The building of the Azerbaijan State Theater of Young Spectators (built 1965).
73		A residential building where was located a zoo-shop during the Soviet times.
74		National Library of Azerbaijan, opened in 1923. Its northern facade overlooks the Nizami Street.
75		House, built in 1896 by Haji Rajabli. During the Soviet era the first store accommodated the Vatan cinema.
76		The building of the Azerbaijan State Song Theater named after Rashid Behbudov.
77		A residential house (built in 1957).
79		House, ordered by Murtuza Mukhtarov and built in 1896. In 1927–1931 Jamshid Nakhichevanski resided there.
81		A residential house.
83		A building with jugs and one of the two houses of oilmen constructed by M. Huseynov and S. Dadashov in 1958.
85		Nasimi Park.
87,89		The building of the State Committee on Capital Issues.
90		Skobelev Brothers' Mill.
93		Apartment house of Musa Naghiyev, built in 1911.
95		Azerbaijan State Academic Opera and Ballet Theater, built in 1911.
96		Office center "Landmark".
99		A residential house (built in 1964).
103		A residential house (built in 1952).
109		A residential house (built in 1955).
115		Building of Russian Imperial Technical Society, erected in 1899.
117		Institut Français Azerbaïdjan
