= Ismailiyya Palace =

Historical building in Azerbaijan

Coordinates: 40°22′6.69″N 49°50′0.98″E

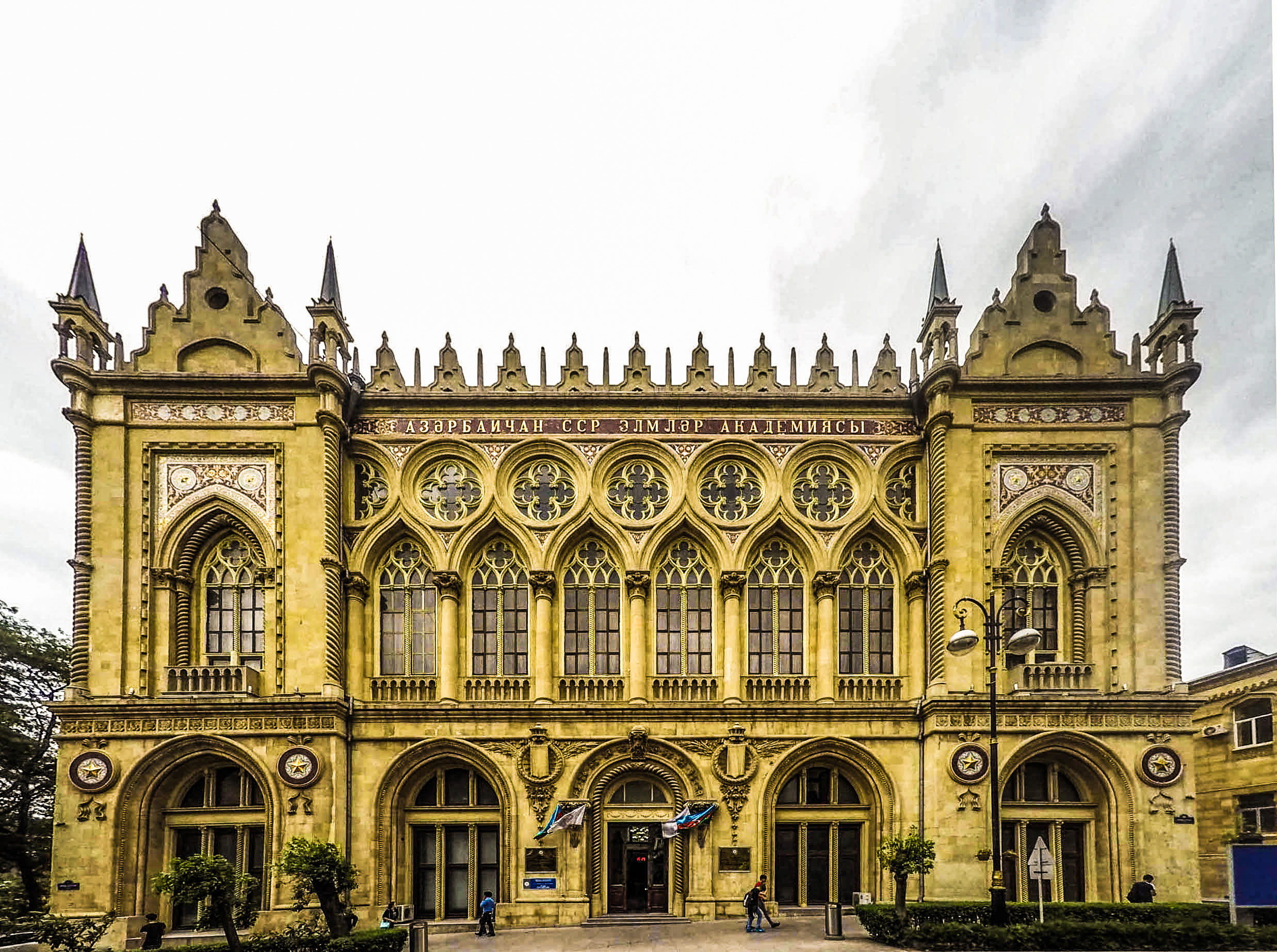
- Interactive map of the Ismailiyya Palace area

General information
- Architectural style: Venetian Gothic
- Location: Istiglaliyyat Street, Baku, Azerbaijan
- Construction started: 1908
- Completed: 1913
- Owner: Musa Naghiyev

Design and construction
- Architect: Józef Płoszko

The Ismailiyya Palace (Azerbaijani: İsmailiyyə Sarayı) is a historical building that currently serves as the Presidium of the Academy of Sciences of Azerbaijan. It is on Istiglaliyyat Street in Baku. The palace was constructed for a Charity Society by Polish architect Józef Płoszko, at the expense of the millionaire Musa Naghiyev in commemoration of his deceased son Ismayil, and was named Ismailiyya after him. Construction began in 1908 and ended in 1913.

== Location ==
The building of mosques is appointed to be in a place called "Gapan Dibi" in the center of the city. Although it was initially planned to build a garden with fountains surrounding the mosque, the Christian clerics, who had great influence in the period of the Russian Empire, prevented the construction of such a mosque near the Alexander Nevski Church, which is called the Golden Church (Qızıl kilsə).

This square, by waiting for the civil servant’s decision, gradually becomes a natural market as the solution to problem takes too much time. Food and other goods, even animals for selling are brought to this square. Known as Devil's Market(Şeytan bazar), this place was considered to be the most populated point of Baku in the late 19th and early 20th centuries.

While Haji Zeynalabdin planned the school of the girls of Tagiyev (1898-1901), Goslavski also prepared a market building project planned to be built together with the school in 1898. Merchants from Shamakhi, Sheki and Guba sold their wares on the sidewalks, causing pollution. In 1898, the city's architect Y. Goslavski, with the advice of the City Authority, proposed the idea of construction a commercially viable market in line with sanitary norms. Later, officials were also thinking about building a garden in this square. After considering the sales possibility at Nikolayev Street, the plan to build a market in that region has been postponed. Duma’s of city considered that the central highway is not the best commercial place (thinks that it is the main street of the present Istigliyat street in the late 19th century). Nevertheless, this area was vacant for ten years until the construction of Ishmailiyya, one of the most beautiful palaces of Baku, according to the order of the Baku millionaire Aga Musa Nagiyev in memory of his son Ismayil (1875-1902).

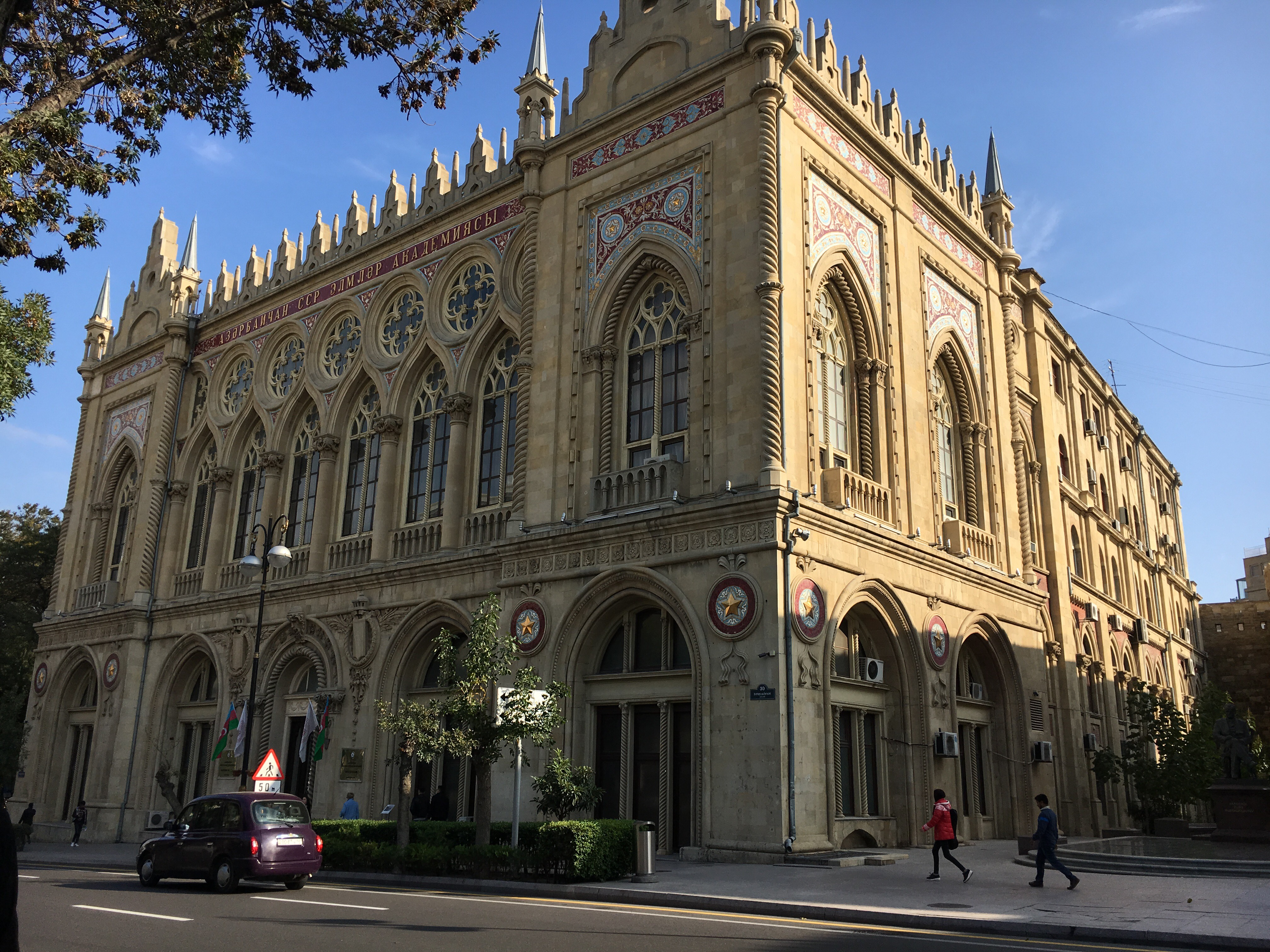

At the beginning of the 1890s, Nikolayev adjusting street project was completed. This street is totally given to administrative and public institutions such as the Governorate, the City Duma and Bureau (current building of Baku City Executive Committee), “Realni Məktəb “(the current construction of the Azerbaijan State Economic University), for the mosque and trade lines. In 1893 the preparation of the area for the construction of the Juma Mosque was initiated. The location of mosque is decided to be placed around fountains and pool in the park. The Baku Muslims wanted to create a religious community that establishes the examples of famous mosques in Istanbul, Tabriz, Isfahan and other eastern cities that represent a magnificent architectural environment among greenery, fountains and transparent water pools.

The place for the construction of the Juma mosque was given to the construction of School for Girls belonged to Haji Zeynalabdin Tagiyev on November 5, 1896. The area where the current palace of Ismailia is favorable for town-building (urbanism) in the structure of the street and occupies an important place in the architectural plan.

== Architecture ==
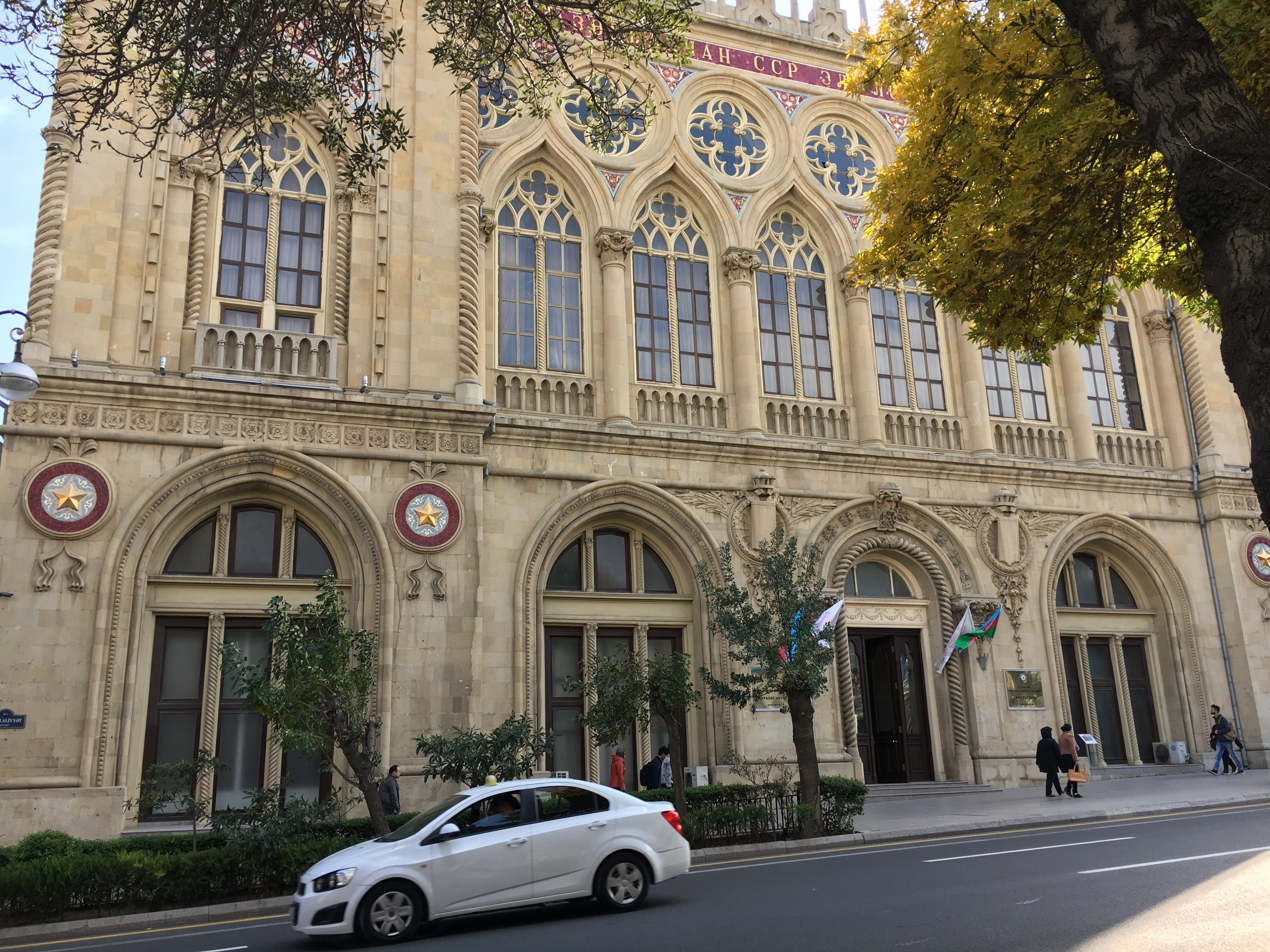

While visiting his son Ismail during his treatment in Switzerland, he always looked at Palazzo Contarini degli Scrigni e Corfu built in Gothic style and had a desire to build a similar structure for his son in Baku.

In 1905, he sent Polish architect Płoszko to that city to prepare the project of the palace in Switzerland in order to build the future Ismailli building. As this process required too much time, the architect had to stay in Switzerland for three years.

Płoszko represented the project of the Venetian building to Agha Musa, and on 21 December 1908, the construction of Ismailliya building was initiated at the solemn ceremony of the Imam. This palace began operating on April 7, 1913. This was Płoszko’s first independent project during the 30 years he lived in Baku and remains his most iconic.

The building was constructed in the Venetian Gothic style. The following sentences were carved with golden letters on the front and side facades of the building to indicate that this building was intended for the Muslim Charity Society:

“Human rises with work, and only with the help of work he can achieve his goal.“ “Work created the human.” “A person should strive for knowledge from birth to death.” “Muslims, your century dies with you. Prepare your descendants for the future.” “Strive for knowledge, in spite of the length of the way.”

Agha Musa described the stone statue at the entrance of central and angels around it as follow:

If Ismail were alive, I would have lots of grandchilds around me, like angels around the statue.

The building was restored with the participation of Alexander Dubov in 1922-1923 and was renamed into the Turkish Cultural Palace for a while. During the restoration of the building, the words "Намят Нагиевым" (commemorating Nagiyev) are written in capital letters instead of the title of Ismailia.

It is strange that the building's stones and plastic details were fasted without using the plaster.

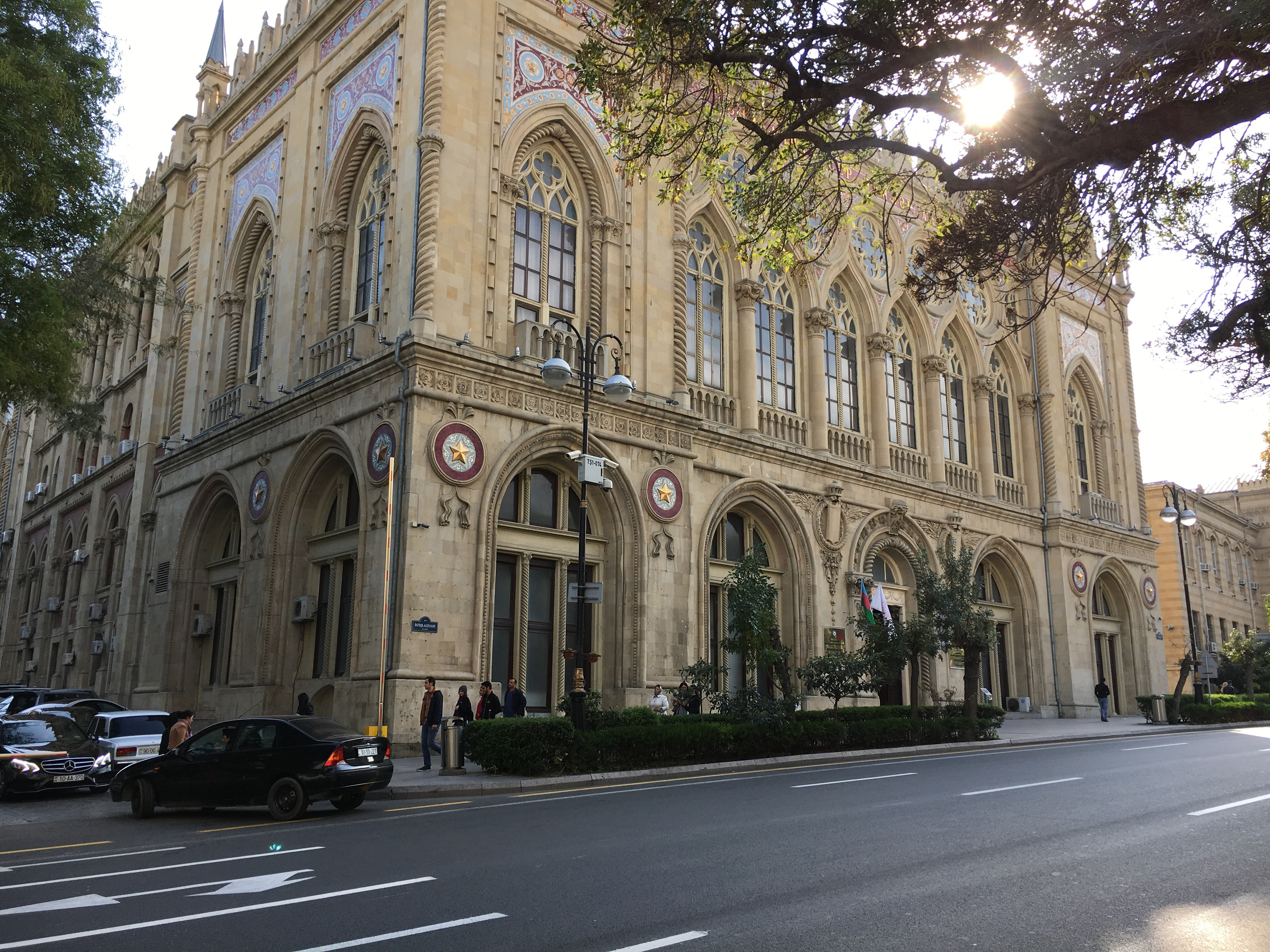

In the following years, the Azerbaijan Society for Scientific Research and Studies (1923-1929), the Azerbaijan State Scientific Research Institute (1929-1932), the TransCaucasian Branch of the USSR Academy of Sciences (1932-1935), the Azerbaijan branch of the USSR Azerbaijan National Academy of Sciences (1933-1945)) and from March, 1945 the Academy of Sciences of Azerbaijan operated. The First International Congress of the World was held at "Ismailiye Palace" during February–March in 1926.

In 1927, during the congress of the Caucasian Muslims, Shafiga Efendiyeva, Adila Shakhtakhtonskaya, Ayna Sultanova and dozens of women joined to women's emancipation for the first time in Azerbaijan.

After the opening ceremony, conferences of Muslim Charity Society members, meetings of Muslim women and Baku intelligentsia, and congresses of clergy were held in the building's white stone assembly hall. The hall's windows open onto Nikolayevskaya street. During the March Days in 1918 the building suffered damage from fire and warfare. In 1923, under the guidance of the architect Dubov, the building was reconstructed and the sentences on the front and side facades were removed. After the reconstruction of “Ismailiyya”, it was occupied by various organizations and agencies: “Society of Inspection and Study of Azerbaijan”, “Archeological Commission”, “Society of Turkish Culture”, “Fund of Manuscripts”, Republican branch of the Academy of Sciences of the USSR and others. Currently, the Presidium of the Academy of Sciences is located there.

== See also ==
- Musa Nagiyev
- Hacı Zeynelabdin Tagiyev

== Gallery ==
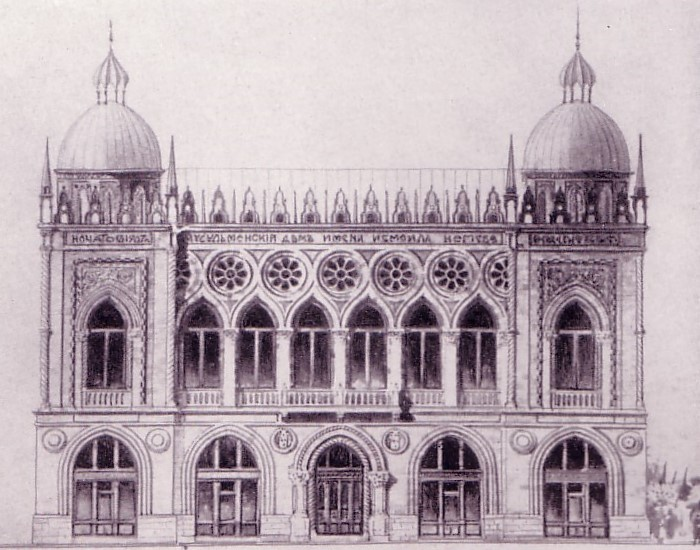

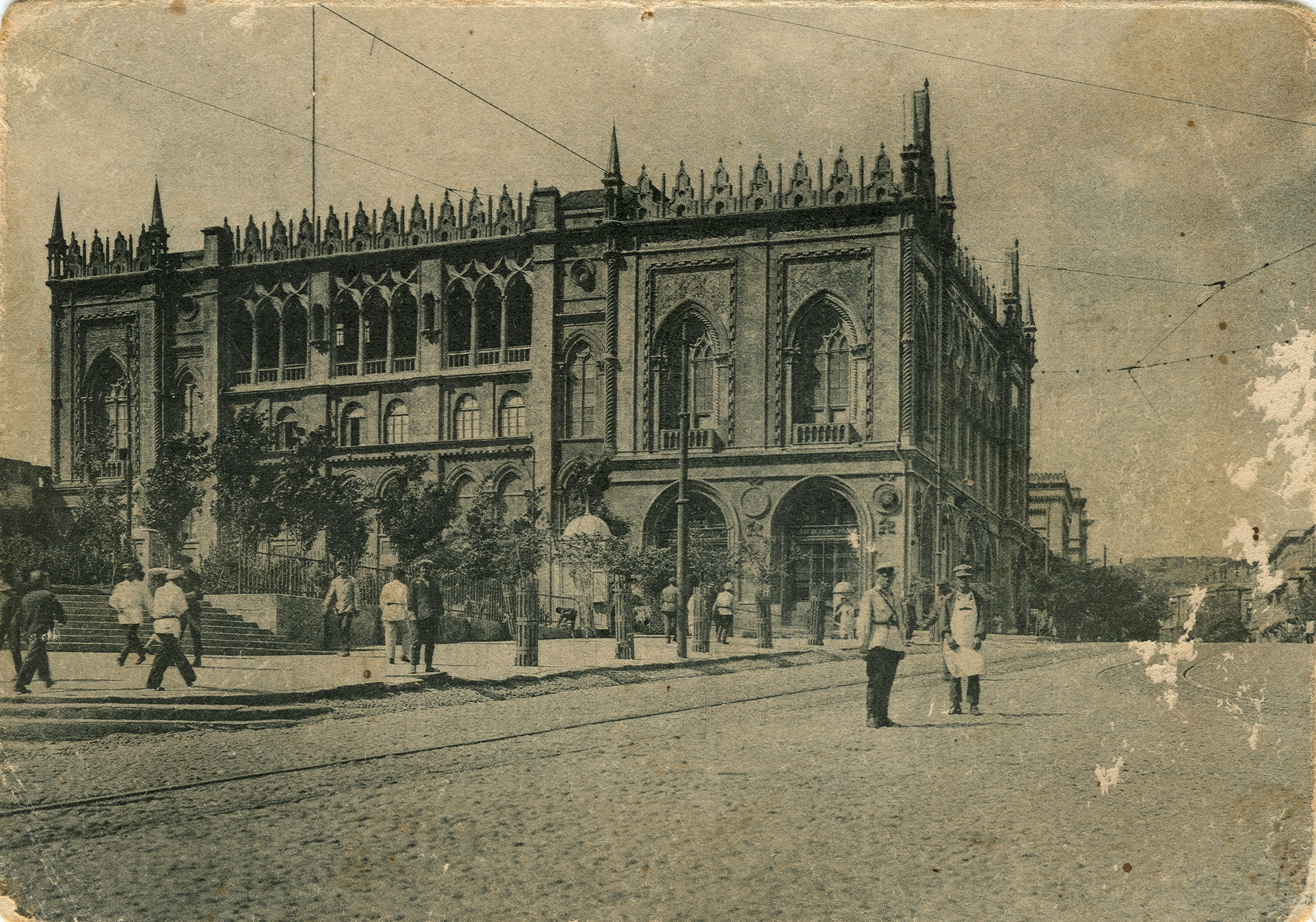
Old view from Istiglaliyyat Street

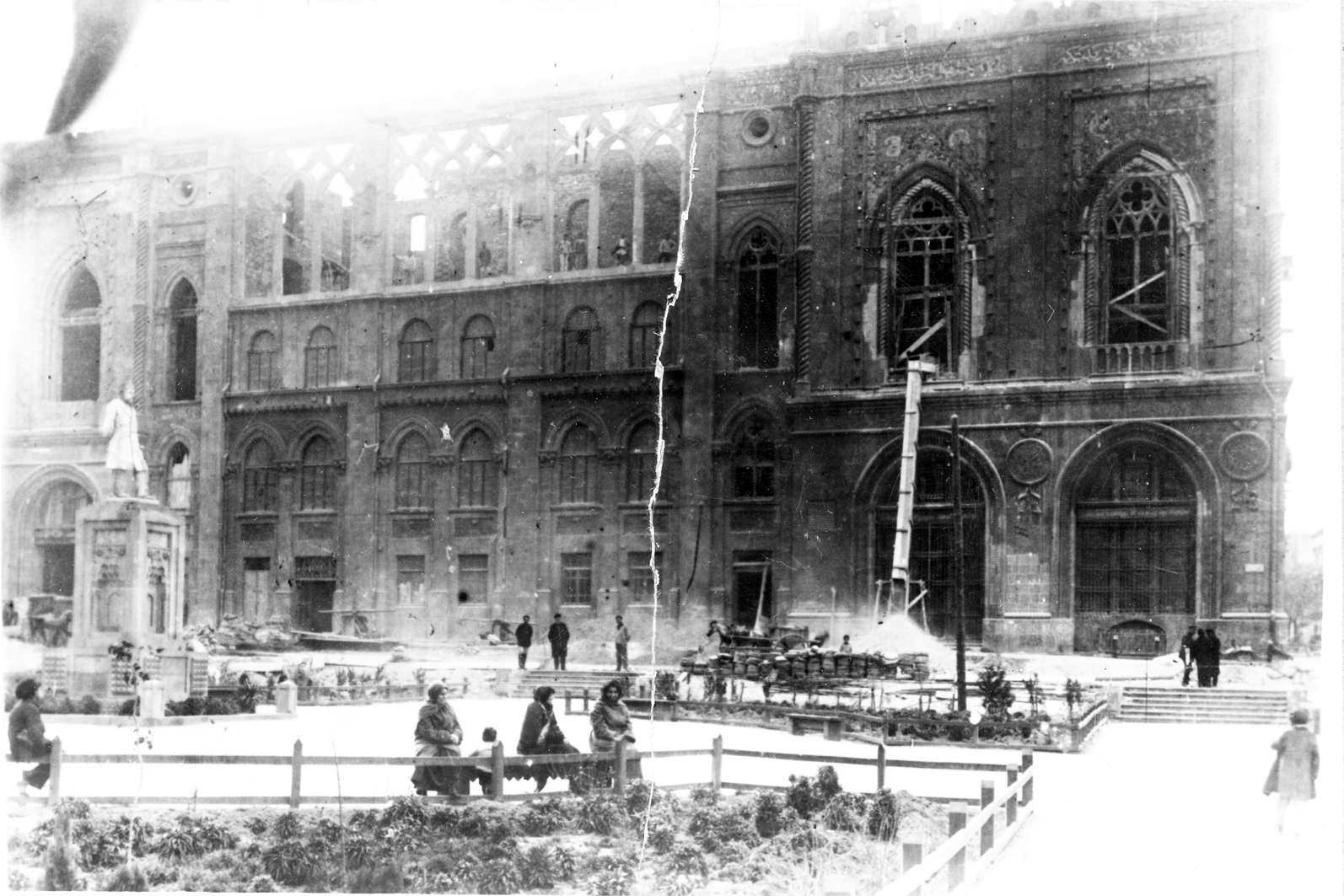
Ruined during the March Days, the building is being renovated in 1920s

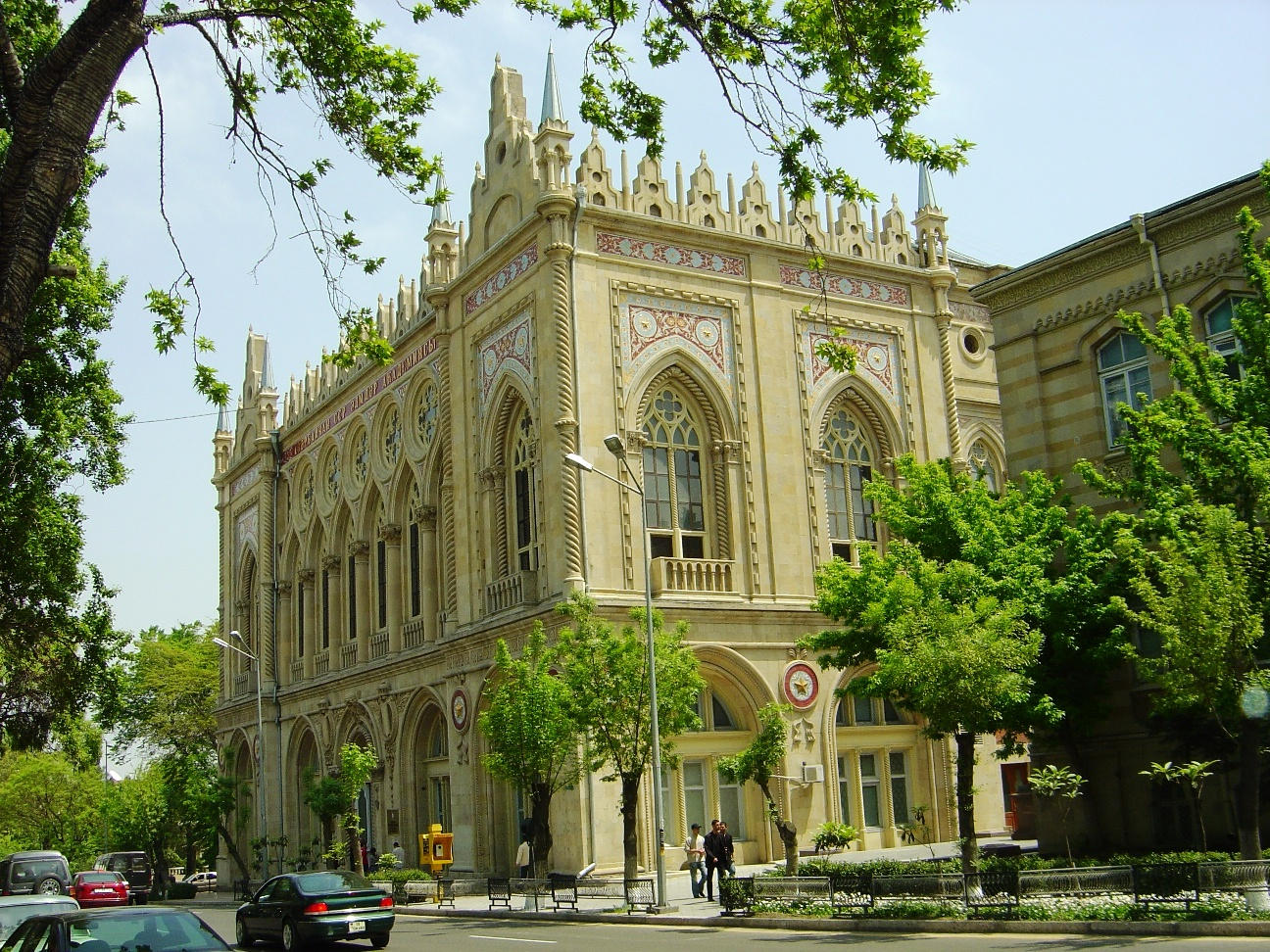

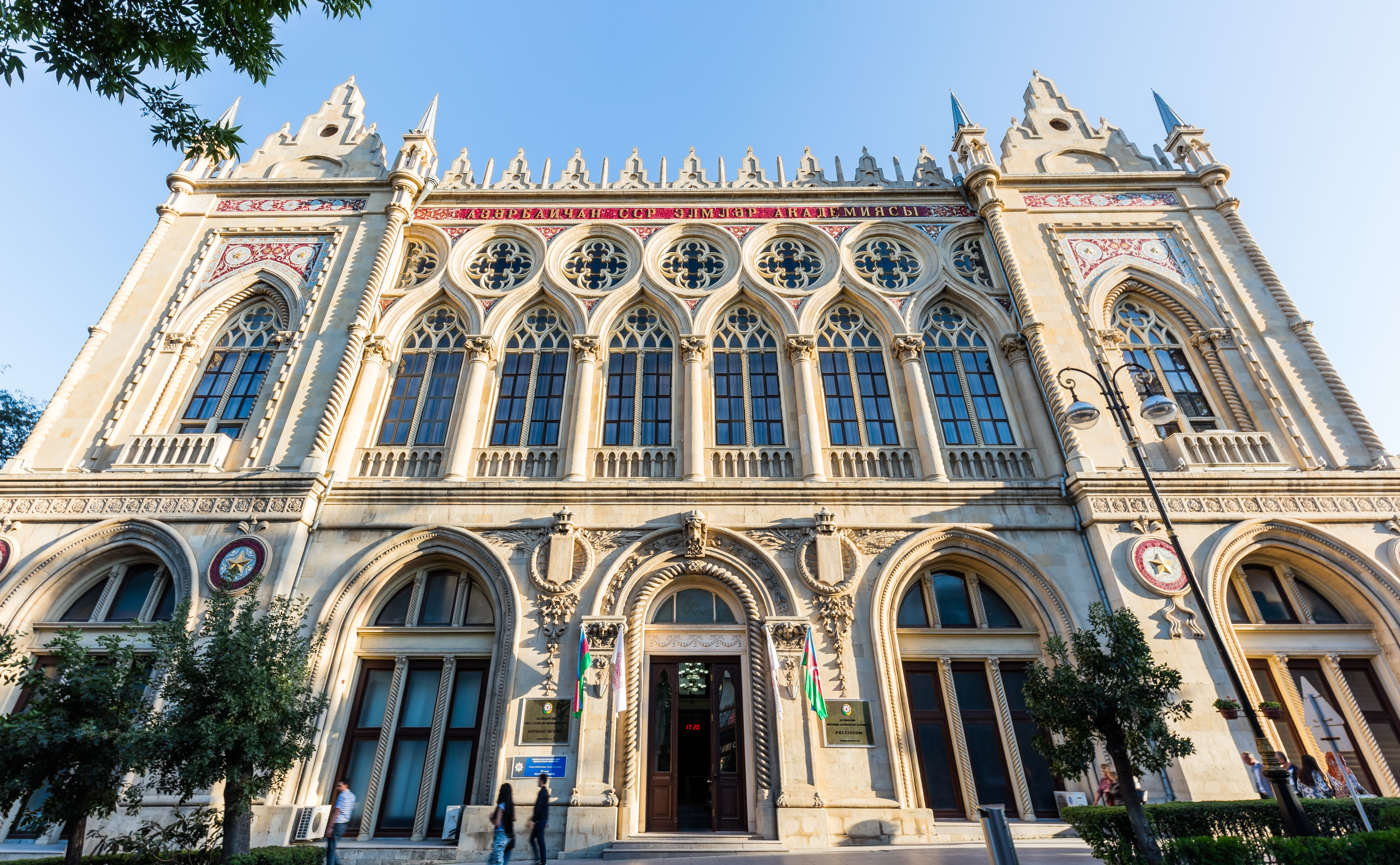

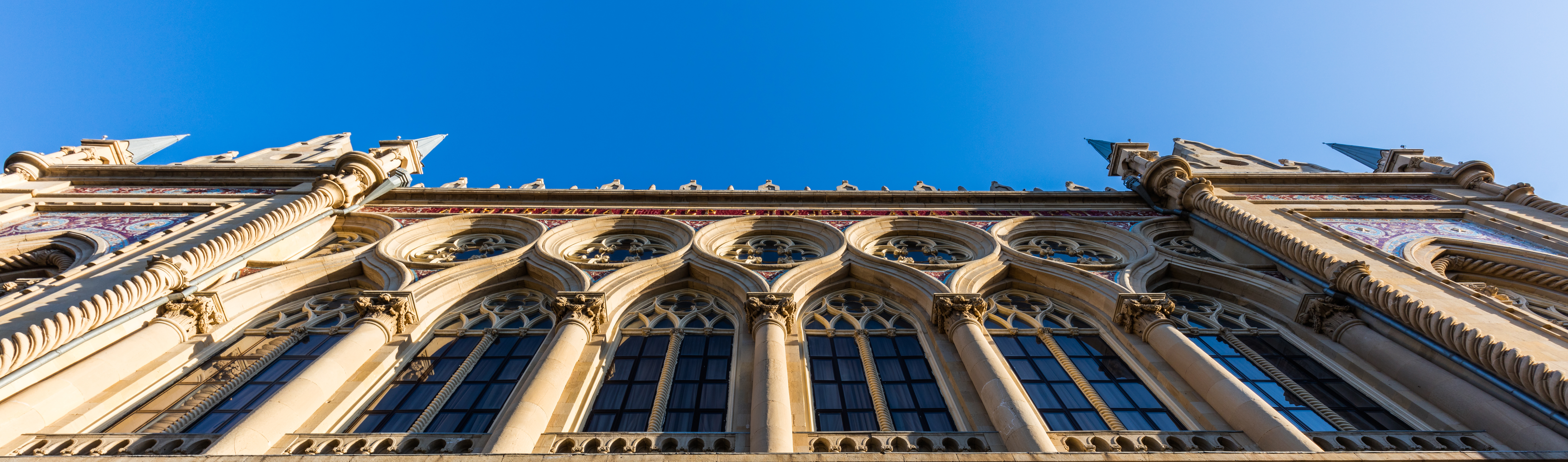
