= Four-storey tenement house of Musa Nagiyev =

Historic building in Baku, Azerbaijan

- Azerbaijani: Musa Nağıyevin dördmərtəbəli mədaxil evi
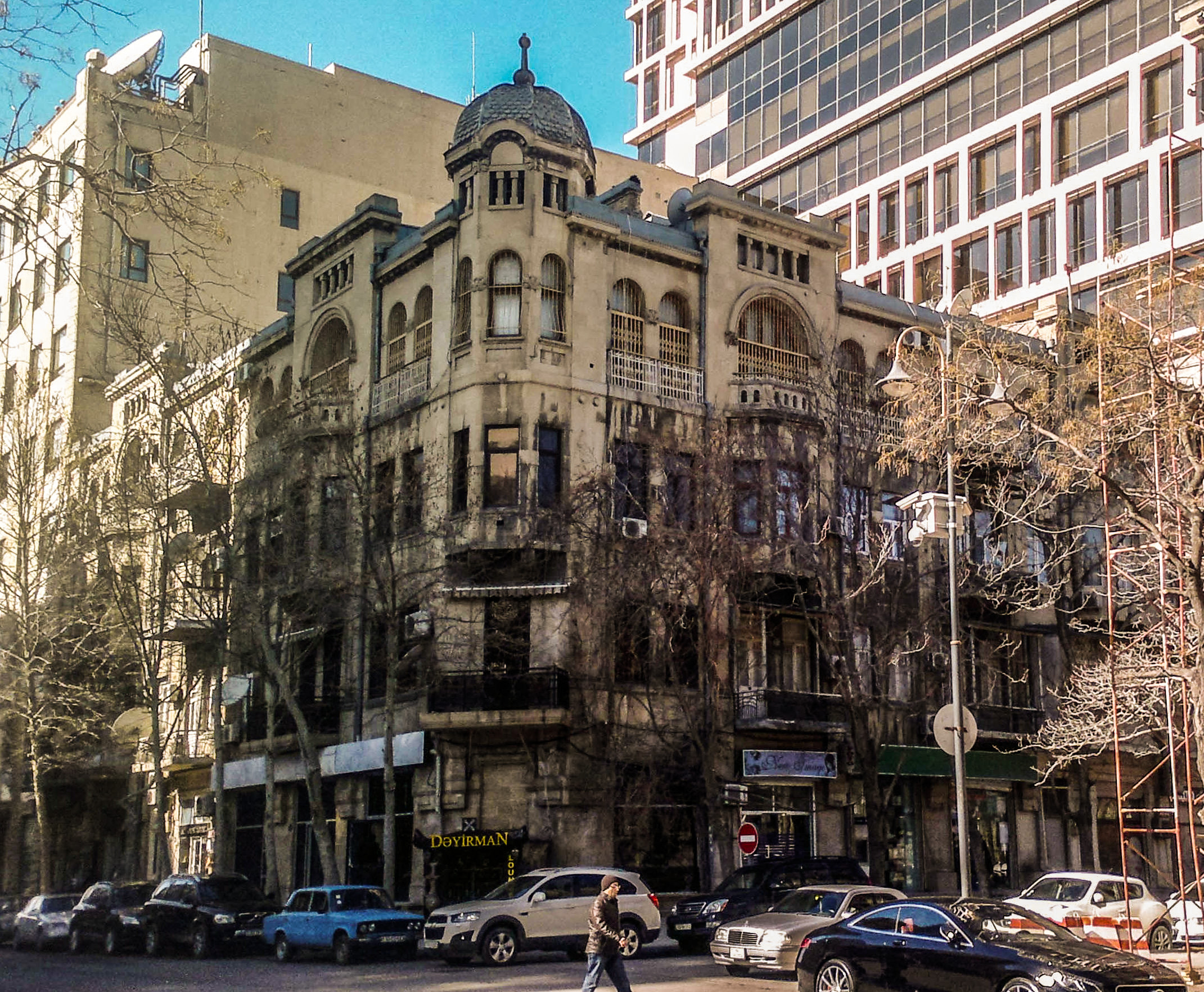
- Interactive map of the Four-storey tenement house of Musa Nagiyev area

General information
- Location: 47 Khagani Str., Baku, Azerbaijan
- Construction started: 1910
- Completed: 1912

Design and construction
- Architect: Józef Płoszko

The four-storey tenement house of Agha Musa Nagiyev (or Musa Nagiyev) is an edifice in Baku built in 1910-1912. The customer of the construction was Agha Musa Nagiyev, and the architect was a Polish man named Joseph Ploshko. By the Decree of the Cabinet of Ministers of the Republic of Azerbaijan No. 132 dated with 2 August 2001, the house was included in the list of immovable monuments of history and culture of local importance.

== Architectural features ==
In 1910-1912, at the order of Agha Musa Nagiyev, another four-story apartment edifice was built on one of his many free plots – on the 47 Molokan Str. (nowadays - 47 Khagani Str.), on the border of the historical quarters of Baku.

The house occupies a corner position and is distinguished by its town-planning position, and its monumental architectural image in the object-spatial environment. The sense of scale and proportional division of the facades are characteristic to the architect Joseph Ploshko. He built the compositional structure of the edifice as a monolithic volumetric form, then divided it into the main elements of the first order, as well as the elements of the applied second order. When creating the architectural frame of the facade, the architect took into account the planning solution of the apartments, from which follows the main idea of formation and development into a three-dimensional measurement.

The house is distinguished by the richness of the voluminous plasticity which harmonizes well with the architectural interpretation of the facades in the spirit of the strict modernity. The angular location of the building and the expressiveness of the overall silhouette with numerous balconies, bay windows and loggias predetermined the architectural significance in the system of the city quarters of Baku. The underlined rhythm of the rafters, combined with their vertical axes, the corner fixed by a faceted bay window with a decorative dome, revealed the versatility of the edifice's content. Among the main means of the facade is the oriented dynamics of the architectural scale. Rasskrepka, brought out beyond the cornice, perfectly traced the arch of the loggia with beautiful stone details with deep carvings, energetic plasticity and sublime impulse, allowing us to note the dynamics of architectural techniques. In this structure, the facing material of the walls plays an active role, and in the architectural details – it is about the limestone.
