= Gasim bey Hajibababeyov =

Qasım bəy Hacıbababəyov
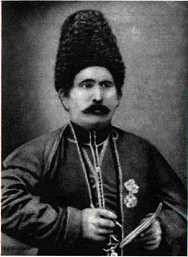
- Born: Qasım bəy Hacıbababəyov; 1811; Shamakhi, Azerbaijan
- Died: 1874 (aged 62–63); Shamakhi, Azerbaijan
- Known for: Architect

Gasim bey Hajibababeyov (Azerbaijani: Qasım bəy Hacıbababəyov; 1811 – 1874) was an Azerbaijani architect.

== Biography ==
Gasim bey was born in 1812 in Sarytorpaq village of Shamakhi. He got his primary education at mollah. His father and older brother, Semed bey, were also architects.

Gasim bey was the first among the Caucasians who worked in governmental and public organizations in the sphere of architecture and urban planning. And he was one of the first architects of Baku.

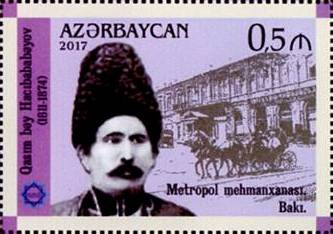
Stamps of Azerbaijan, 2017

From 1848 he worked as an assistant of a province architect of Shamakhi. In 1856 he became the architect of Shamakhi province. In 1868 he became the chief architect of Baku and from 1868 till the end of his life was the chief architect of Shamakhi. His skills in the planning of Baku ravished the Russian and European architects. All streets in Baku have been laid by the architect stepwise with regard to a relief and topography of the locality, its hills and slopes. He worked out a structure of urban gardens near seafront, which also exist even at the present days.

Gasim bey came to Baku after an earthquake in Shamakhi, when Baku became a center of the province.

He worked as an architect of Shamakhi at the end of his life.

His student Gafar Ismayilov has built more than hundred one- and two-storeyed residential houses, many stores, mosques and a bathhouse.

== Works in Baku ==
1. Baku Boulevard – 1860-1861
2. Tsitsianov square – 1860
3. Two-storeyed caravanserai – 1860s (At present - Nizami Museum of Azerbaijani Literature)
4. Two-storeyed caravanserai – 1870s (now - Vorontsovskaya street 1)
5. Residential houses in Krivaya street – 1870s
6. Building of "Araz" cinema
7. Fountains square
