= House of Sadykhov brothers =

Historic building in Baku, Azerbaijan

- Azerbaijani: Sadıqov qardaşlarının mədaxil evi
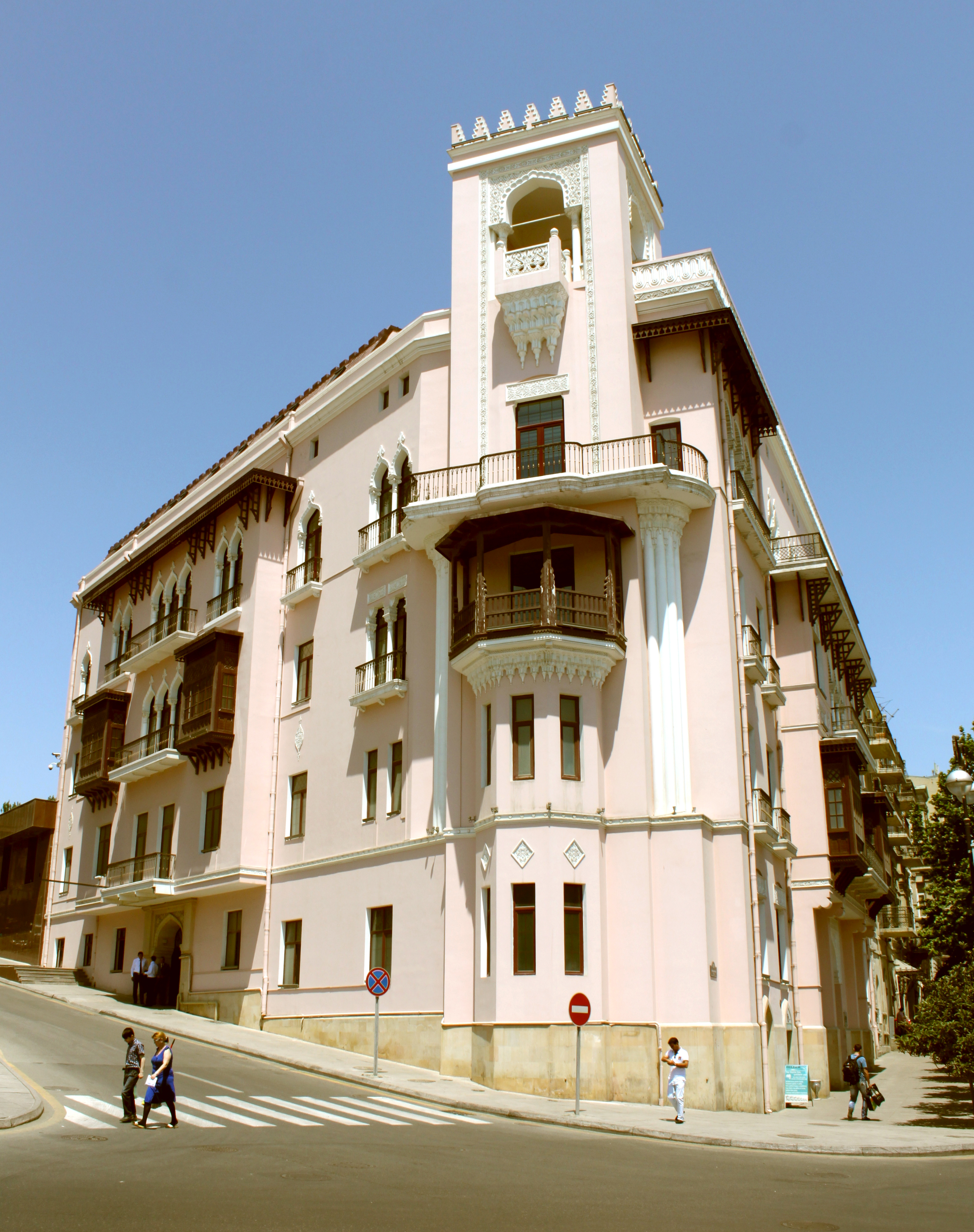

- Location within Azerbaijan
- Alternative names: Profit house of Sadykhov brothers

General information
- Type: Mansion
- Architectural style: National-romantic architecture
- Location: Istiglaliyyat Street, 21, Baku, Azerbaijan
- Coordinates: 40.3639903°N 49.8300898°E
- Construction started: 1910
- Completed: 1912
- Client: Sadykhov brothers

Technical details
- Floor count: 7

Design and construction
- Architect: Gabriel Ter-Mikelov

House of Sadykhov brothers — is a seven-floored historic building in Baku, at the intersection of Istiglaliyyat and Niyazi streets, opposite Philharmonic Garden. The building was registered as a monument of local significance by the decision of the Cabinet of Ministers of the Republic of Azerbaijan dated August 2, 2001, No. 132.

The building has different compositional structures and architectural features, elements and details of local architecture. The house of residence has a rich volume of plastic.

== History ==
There was a cemetery in the area where the building was located. That is why, when the construction began, the local people say to the customer, “Karbalai, you have chosen a bad place, you waste money in vain.” He replied, “Do not talk about it, it's a good place. Even the governor planted a garden for me in front of the house.”

The revenue house of Sadykhov brothers was built in the style of national-romantic architecture in 1910-1912. In 1909, a contest on the design of this house was announced in former Russian Empire, and the author of the building, Gabriel Ter-Mikelov, won the first prize. During the Soviet era, the Central Executive Committee of the Azerbaijan SSR was located in the building.

== Architectural features ==
The building was built on the corners of Niyazi and Istiqlaliyyat streets and occupies a responsible city development position while attracting special attention. Though the building has characteristic of eastern architecture, interpretation of the architect and the consideration of the local climatic conditions led to have many porches and loggias.

Its planning structure is traditionally distinguished by two-row decks of rooms without glass verandahs. The front entrance with a particular arches leads to first lighted vestibule with marble stairs. E.A.Tigranyan, who investigated Ter-Mikelov's work, wrote: “The objective architectural value of house of Sadykhov brothers is that, it stimulated development of realistic national architecture of Azerbaijan.”

== Gallery ==
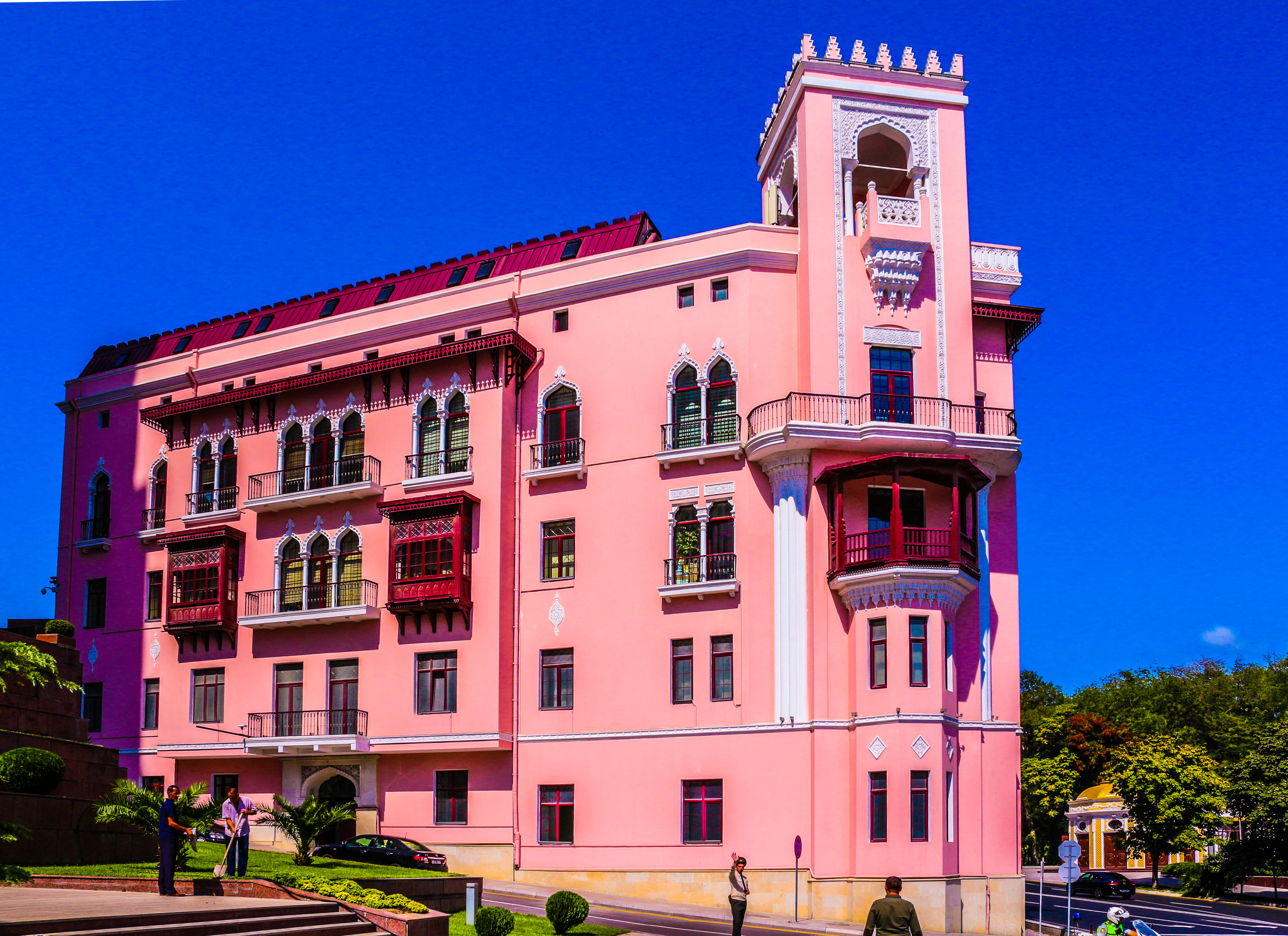
Left facade of house of Sadykhov brothers

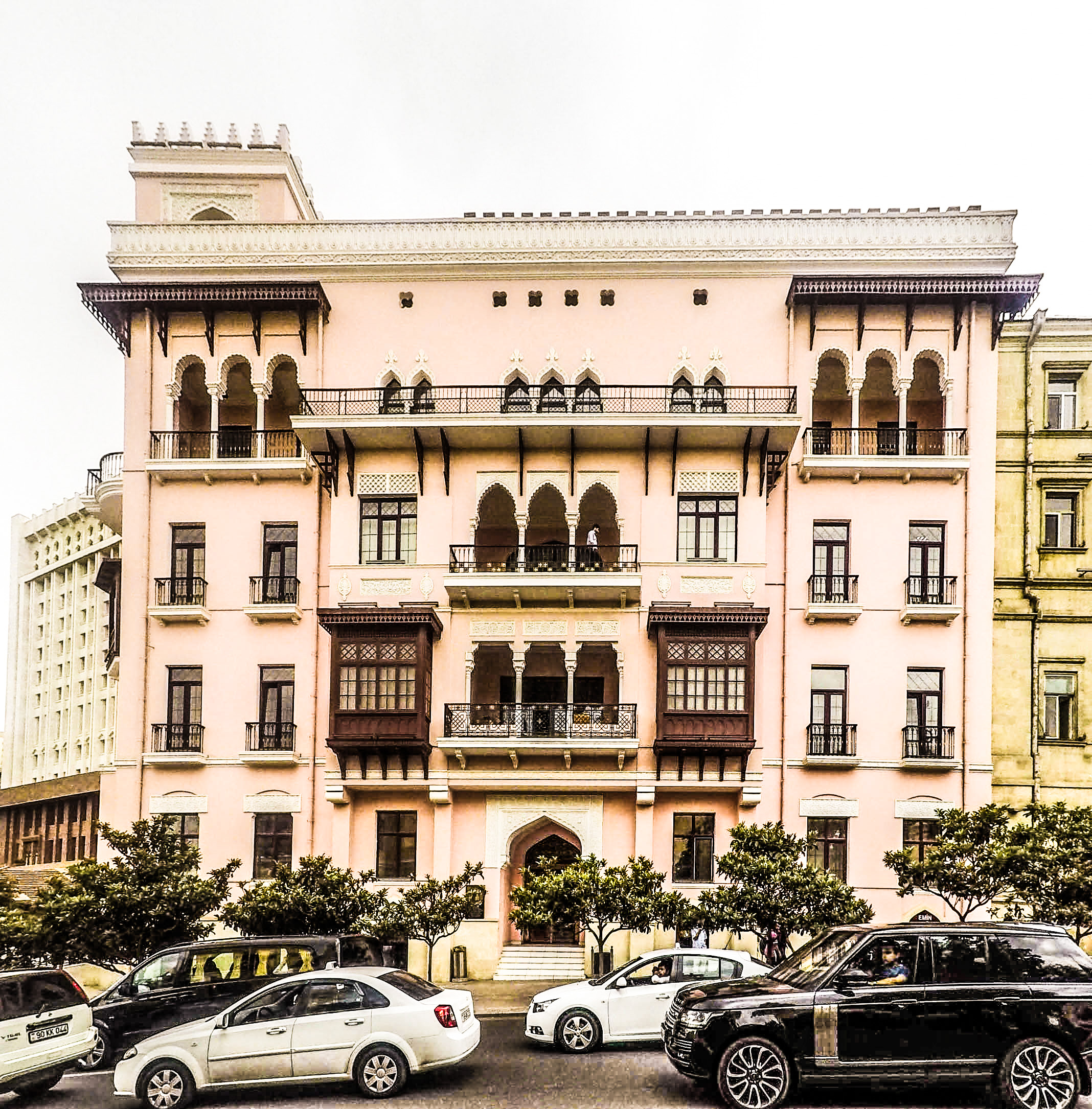
Right facade of the house

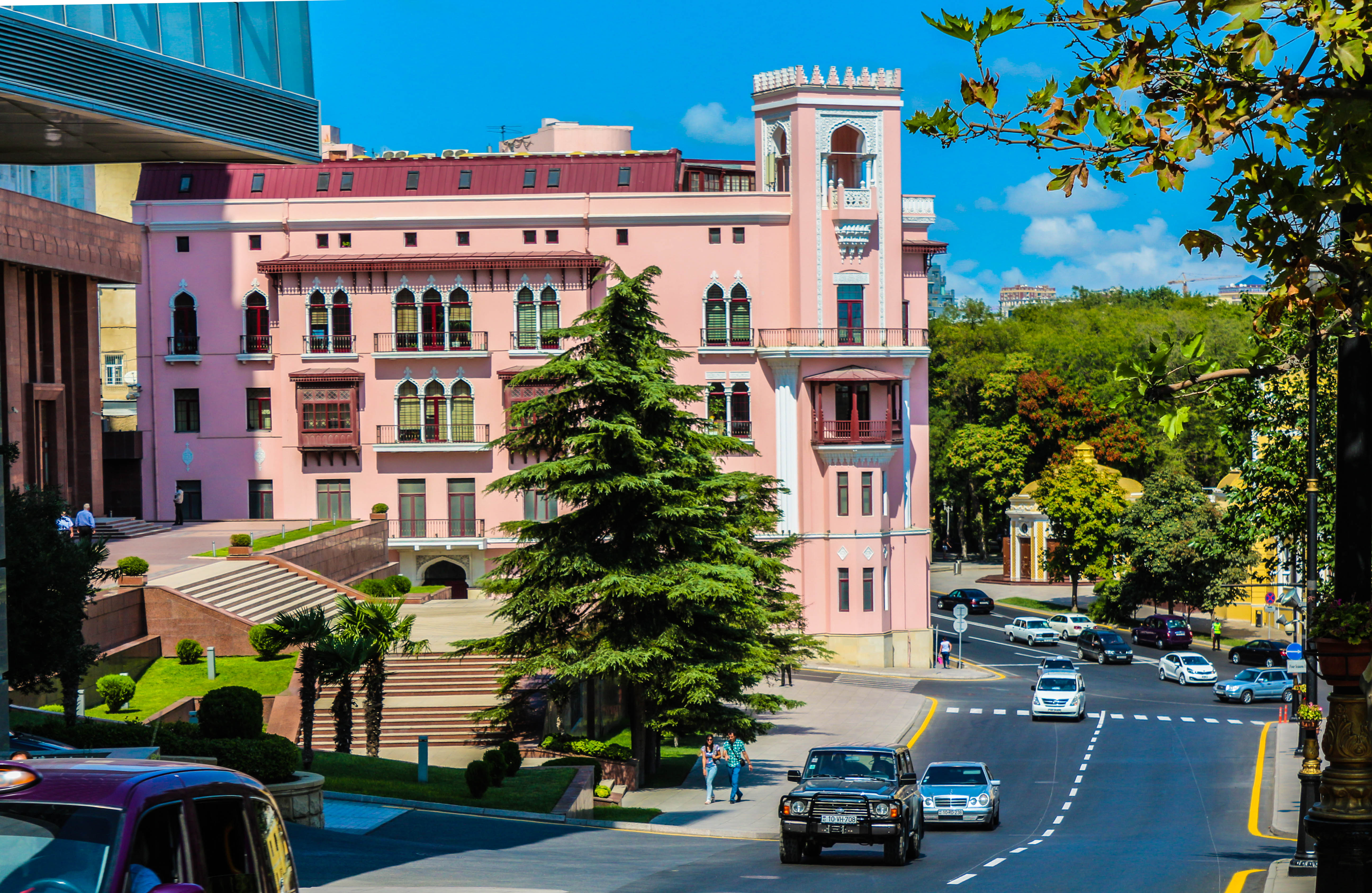
View of house of Sadykhov brothers from Istiglaliyyat Street

== Sources ==
Şamil Fətullayev-Fiqarov - Bakının Memarlıq Ensiklopediyası. Baku, Azerbaijan Architects Union, 528 pages
