= Musa Naghiyev =

Azerbaijani industrial oil magnate

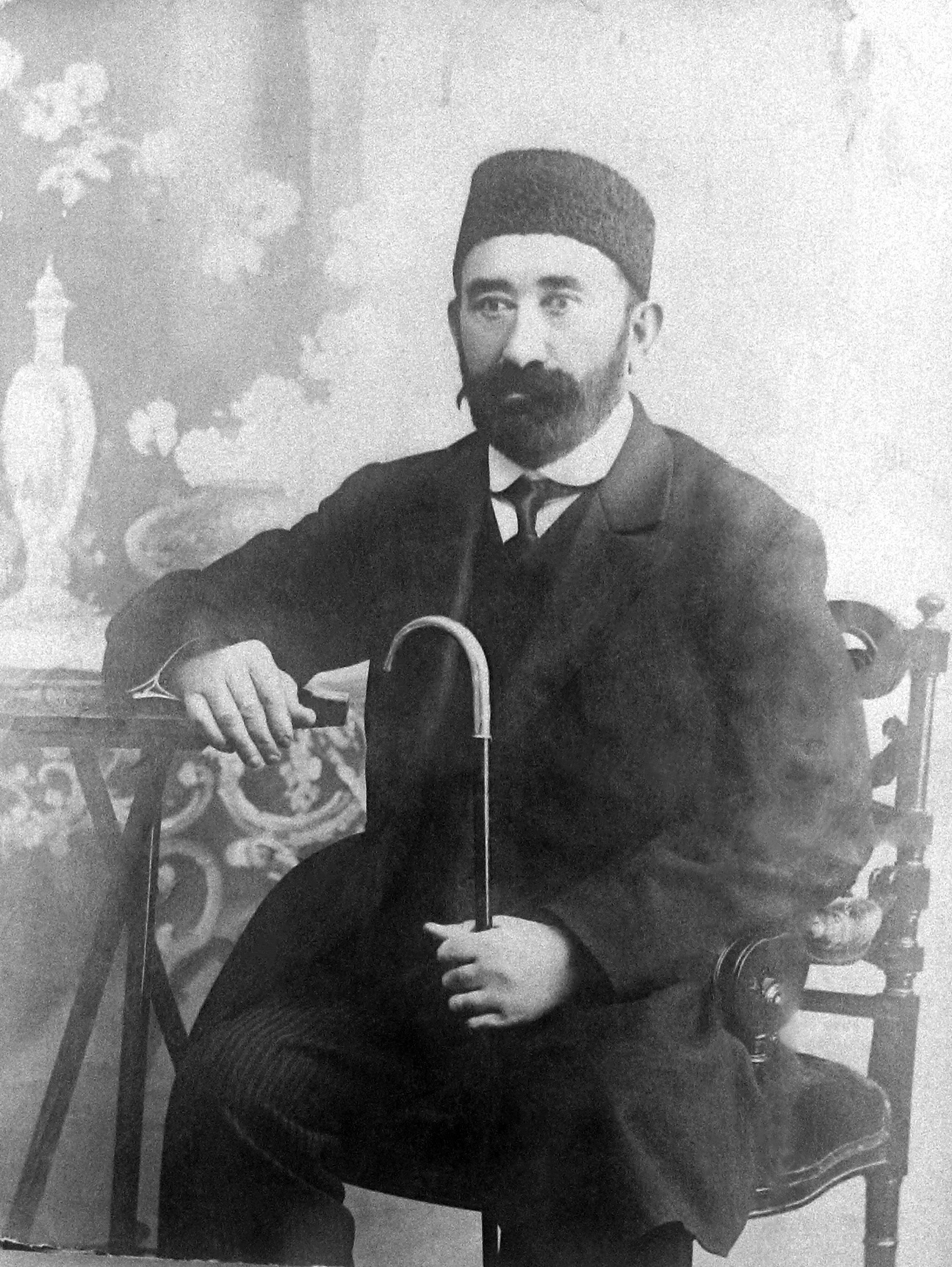
- Born: 1849; Baku, Russian Empire
- Died: 4 March 1919 (aged 69–70); Baku, Azerbaijan Democratic Republic
- Occupation: Businessman

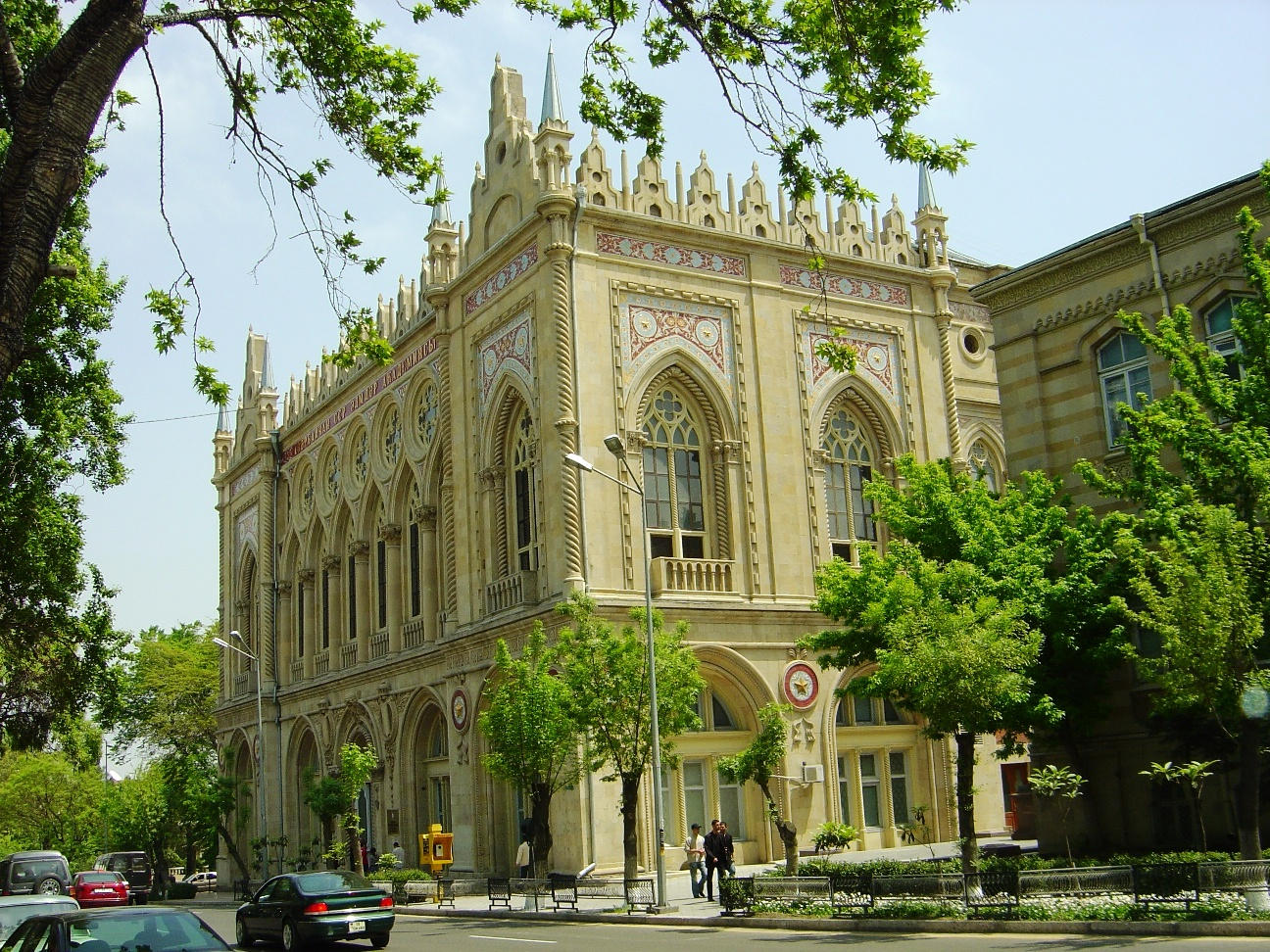
Ismailiyye building on Istiglaliyyat Street in Baku

Agha Musa Naghiyev (Azerbaijani: Ağa Musa Nağıyev) (1849–1919) was an Azerbaijani industrial oil magnate in late 19th – early 20th century. He was also an adherent of the Baháʼí Faith and served on the Spiritual Assembly of the Baháʼís of Baku.

== Life and career ==
He was born into a very poor family near Baku and started working as a cargo carrier (hambal), but thanks to his natural wit and business abilities, he progressed to accumulate a vast amount of wealth. Musa Naghiyev was one of the richest oil industrialists in Baku, next to Nobel brothers. His assets were worth 300 million rubles. Later, he began investing in real estate so as to guarantee himself a source of regular income and became the largest rental property owner in Baku owning more than 200 buildings.

He was considered in Azerbaijan as one of the most stingy, tight-fisted millionaires. However, despite such claims, it was Agha Musa Naghiyev who built one of the most wonderful palaces in the entire city and offered it as a gift to the Muslim Charity Society. This palace, modeled on Doge's Palace in Venice now houses Presidium of Academy of Sciences of Azerbaijan.

Another gift from Naghiyev to the city was the city's largest hospital which was built in 1912 and is still used today by the Ministry of Health. The building is designed in the shape of an "H" (Cyrillic "N") for Naghiyev's name.

The owner of dozens of magnificent buildings in Baku, Agha Musa Naghiyev himself lived in the area outside of Icheri Sheher called Bayir Sheher, in the two-floor building behind Gasim-bey Mosque, on the crossing of Spasski (present Zargarpalan) and Gymnasist (Leo Tolstoy) streets. Actively involved in the work of the Baku Muslim Charitable Society, Musa Naghiyev was a philanthropist during his lifetime.

The architectural elements of stone clocks designed on the top and a stone lantern on the edge of that beautiful building erected in 1887, made it a distinctive appearance. The stone lantern called "Seng fanar" was decorated with red, green, blue, turquoise pieces of glass to create colourful illumination effect during the evenings. Every evening kids were gathering around the building to feast eyes on that startlingly impressive view of street lighting. Such a colourful lit of the stone lantern in Baku at the fin de siècle used to create an amazing and spectacular attraction. Naghiyev was the main sponsor and trustee of one of the largest technical colleges, "Real College", the building now houses the Azerbaijan State Economic University. He died of a heart attack on 4 March 1919.
