= The house with angels =

- Azerbaijani: Mələkli ev
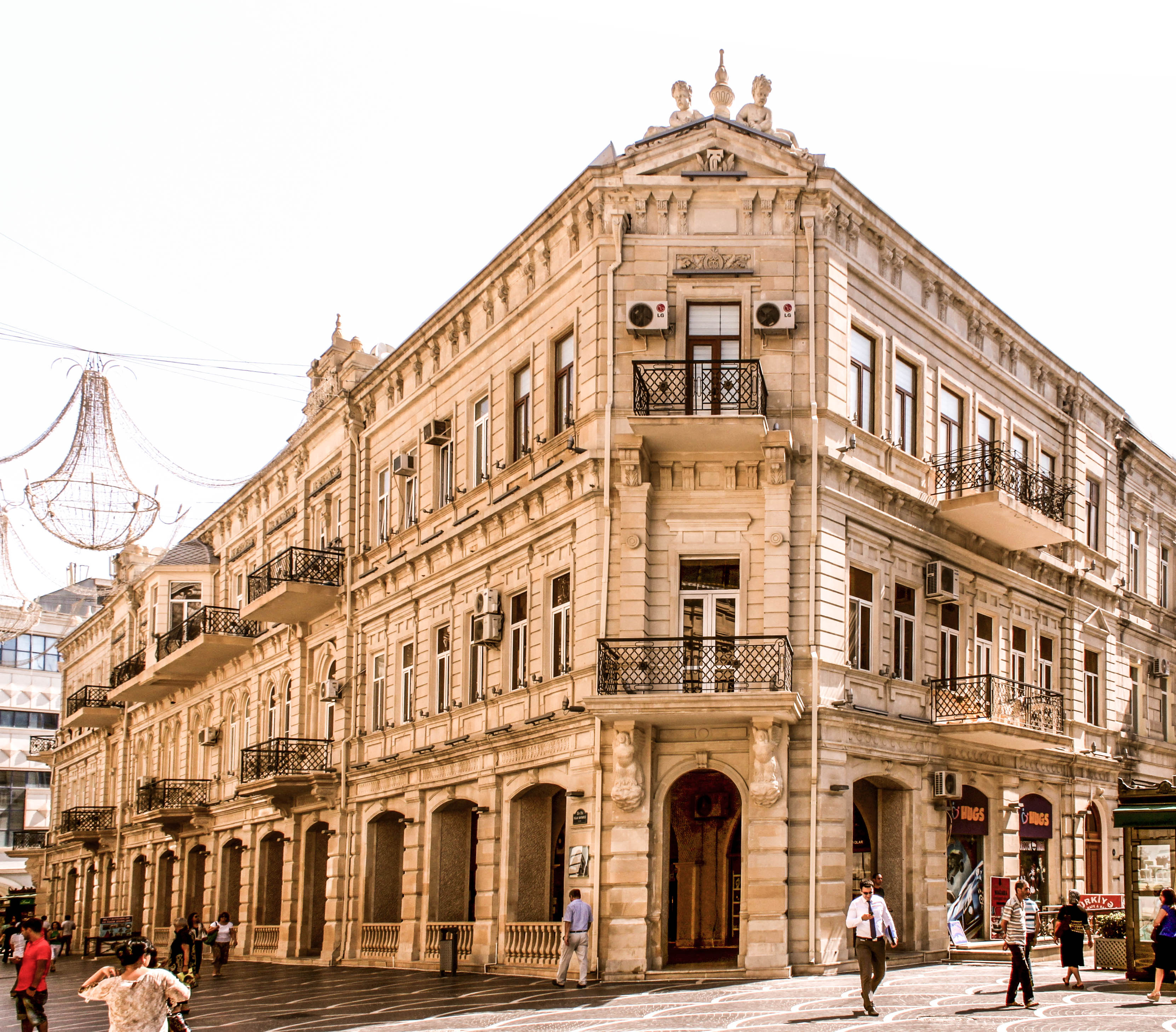
- Interactive map of the The house with angels area

General information
- Location: 26 Nigar Rafibeyli Str., Baku, Sabail, Baku, Azerbaijan
- Coordinates: 40°22′19″N 49°50′20″E
- Completed: 1893

The House with Angels is a three-storey building located in the capital of Azerbaijan, Baku, at the intersection of Nigar Rafibeyli and Rasul Rza streets. According to the order of the Cabinet of Ministers of the Republic of Azerbaijan, it is an architectural monument of history and culture of Azerbaijan of local significance.

== About ==
The house with angels was built by order of the millionaire Sergey Tumayev in 1893, as evidenced there is the date carved in a cartouche on the northern facade of the building. It got its name from the decoration of the triangular pediments of the north-western and north-eastern facades with two sculptural pairs of putti. The angels were placed here between 1893 and 1894 in the honour of Tumayevs two first-born boys birth. In November 2000, during an earthquake, one of them tore off and fell, but then it was restored and safely returned to its place.

The building belonged to Sergey Tumayev until the October Revolution of 1917, after which it was nationalized. In the Soviet times, the poets Rasul Rza and Nigar Rafibeyli lived on the third floor of the house and in their memory a memorial plaque was installed on the facade.

In 1910, the house of the Baku millionaire Musa Nagiyev was raised opposite.

== Gallery ==
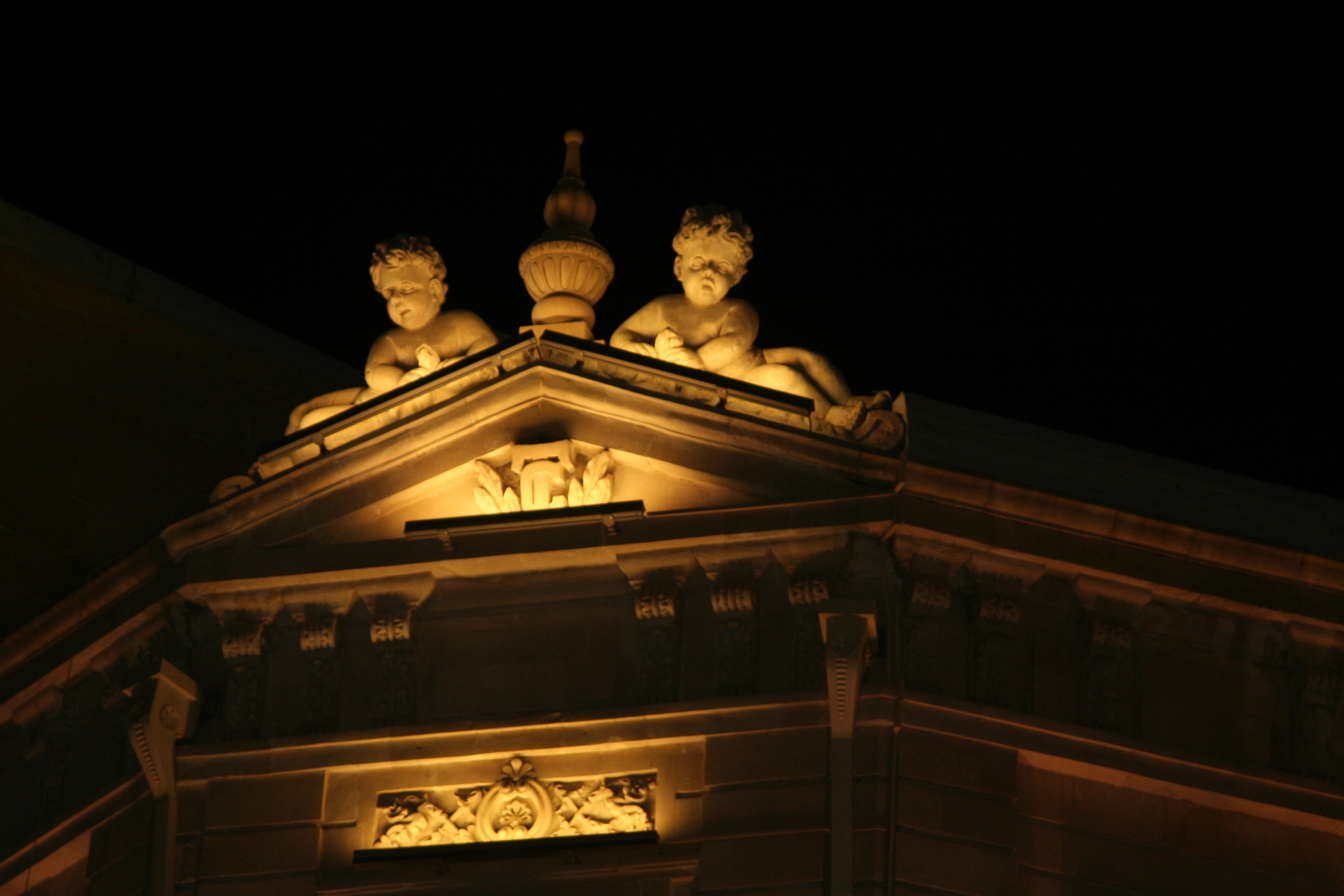

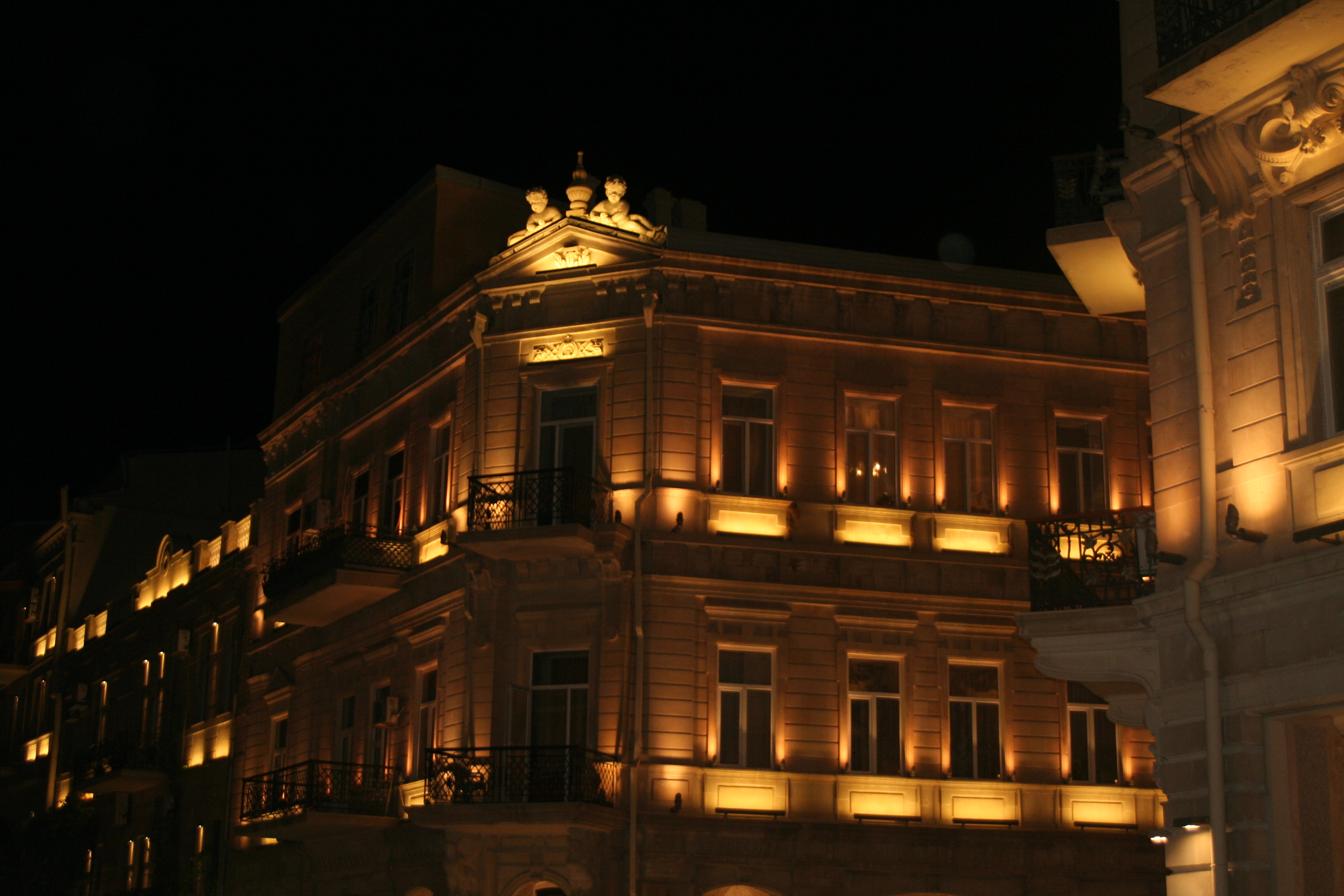

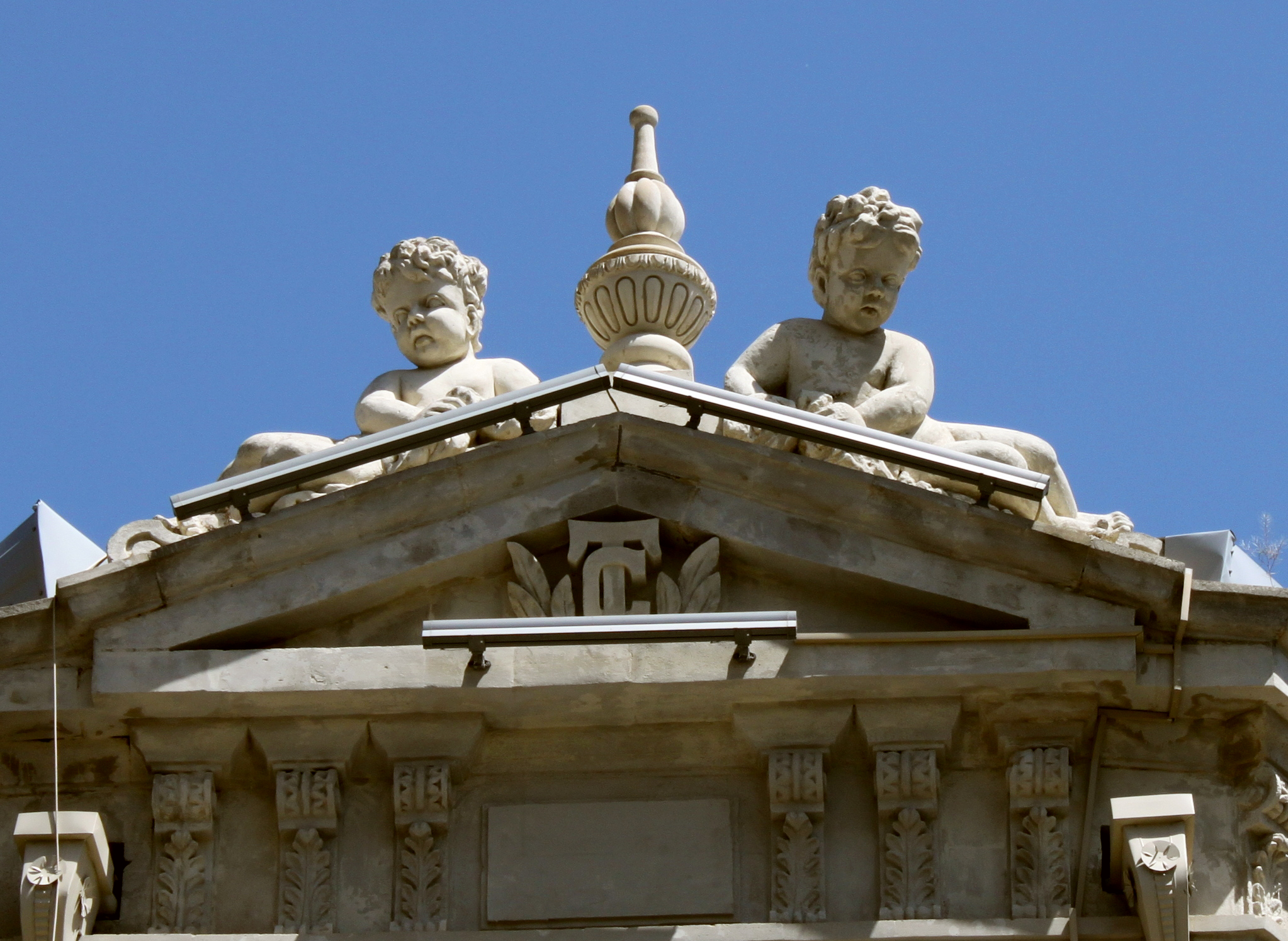

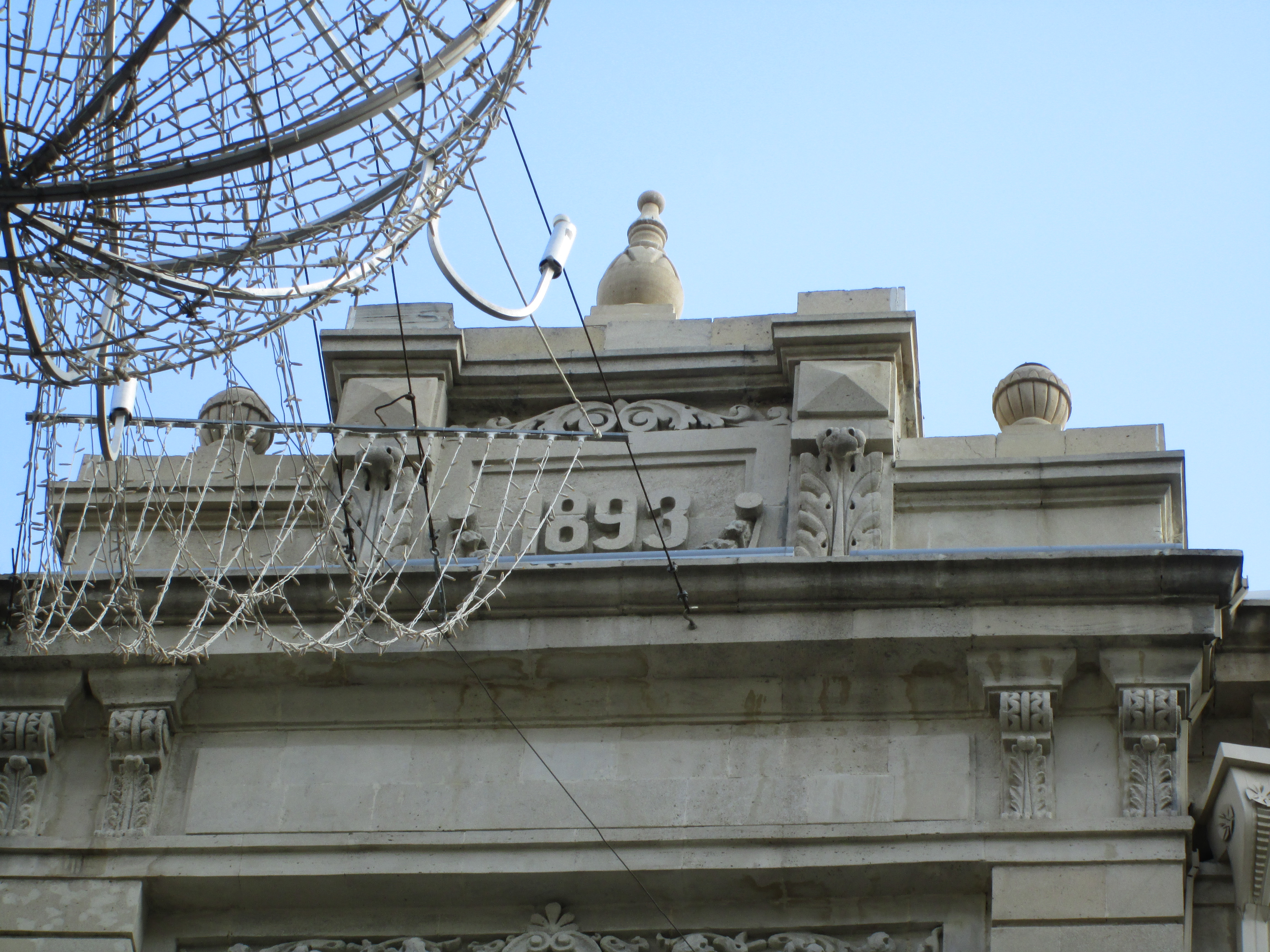

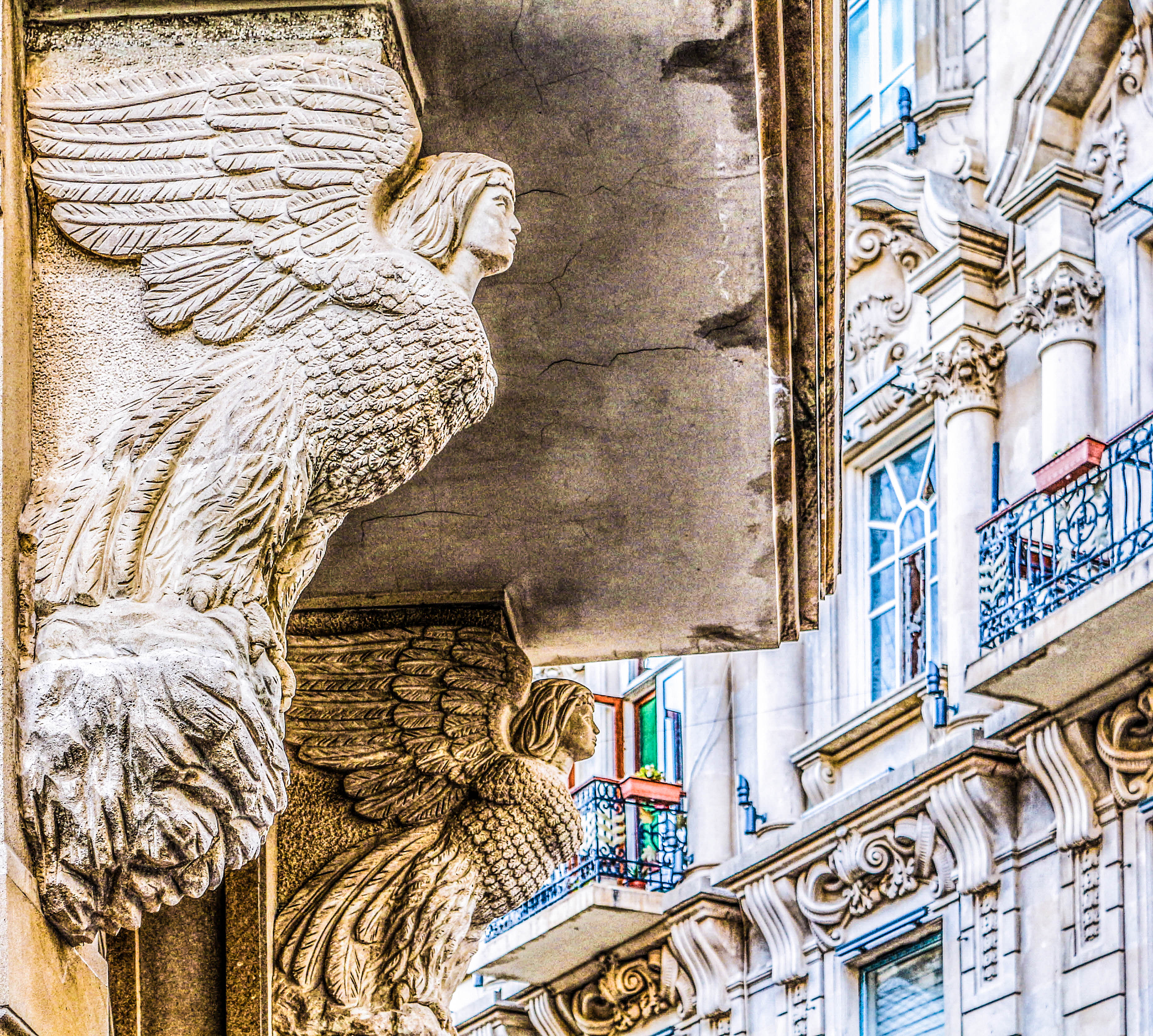

== See also ==
- Alibeyovs’ House
- Mitrofanov Residence
- Property of Haji Mustafa Rasulov
