= The House of Ramazanovs =

19th century building located in Old City Baku, Azerbaijan

- Azerbaijani: Ramazanovların evi
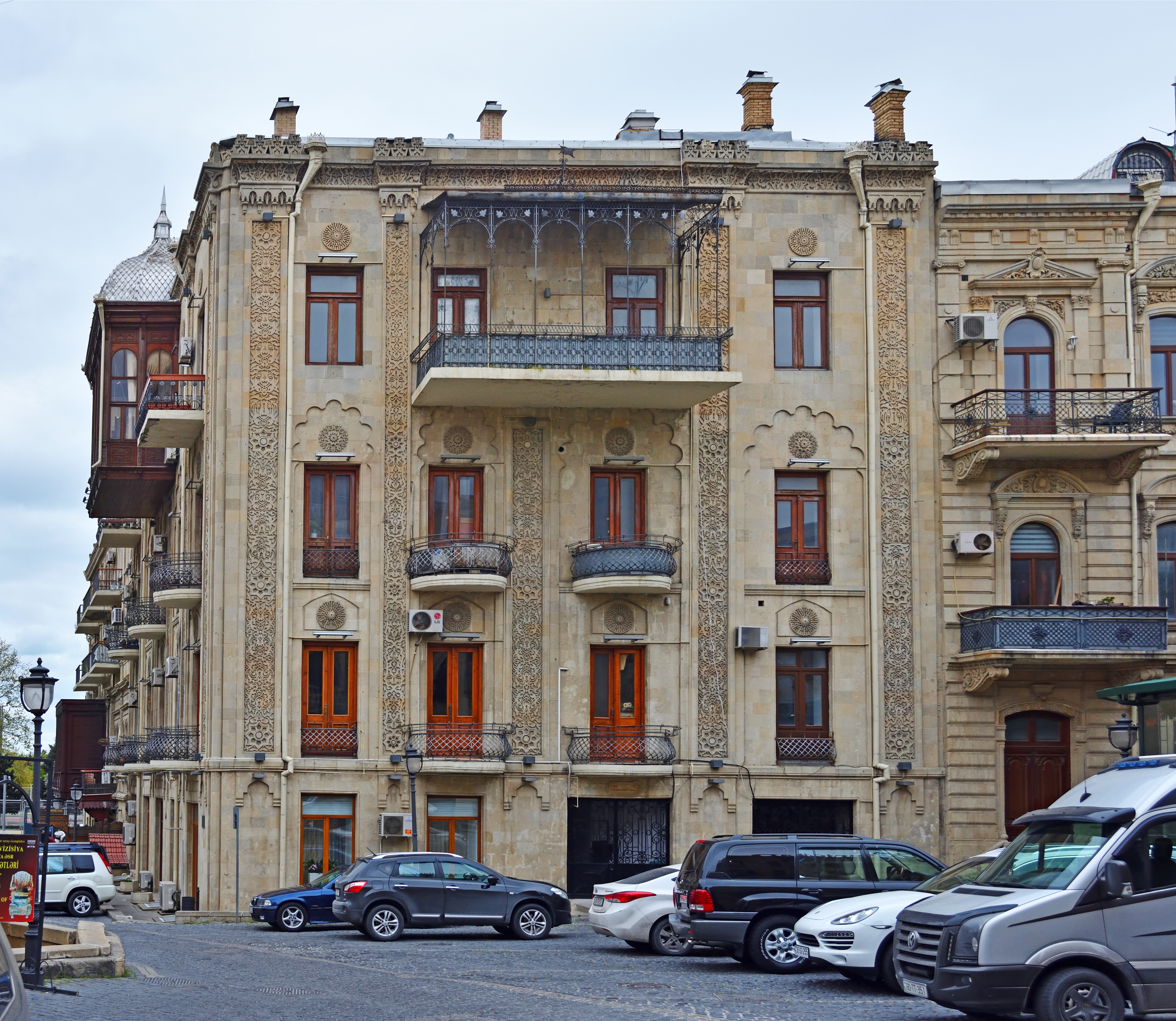
- The house in 2019

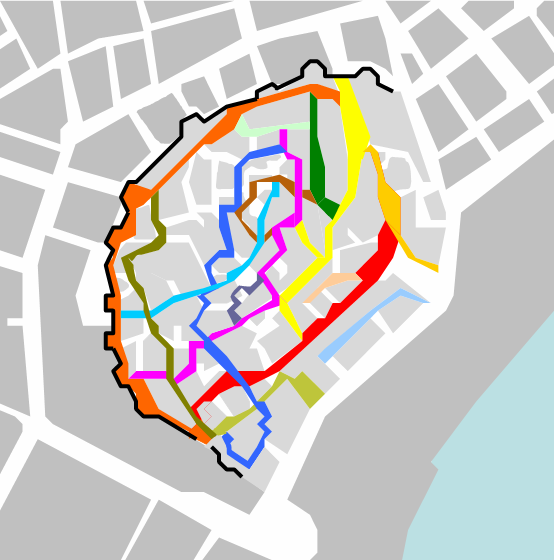
- Location within Streets in Old City, Baku, Azerbaijan

General information
- Type: House
- Architectural style: National Romantic
- Location: Vali Mammadov Street 24, Old City, Baku, Azerbaijan
- Coordinates: 40°21′51″N 49°50′5″E
- Completed: 1895
- Owner: Haji Mammadkarim Ramazanov

The House of Ramazanovs (Azerbaijani: Ramazanovların evi) is a 19th-century building located in the Old City of Baku, the capital of Azerbaijan. The building was completed in 1895 by order of merchant Haji Mammadkarim Ramazanov, designed in the National Romantic style by an unknown architect.

== Overview ==
The Ramazanovs' house was built in 1895 by order of merchant Haji Mammadkarim Ramazanov. The building belonged to Haji Mammadkarim Ramazanov and his wife Umbulbanu. The four-storey building was built in the National Romantic style.

Arches extending from the second floor to the last floor, as well as the language of the concha, referring to the stalactic system of the wooden balcony of the top floor, the domes and stone carvings give the building a special beauty. Elements of oriental architecture were used in the façades. On the first floor of the building, Haji Mammadkarim opened an electric theater called "Ermes". The second floor was leased to the famous businessman Rahim khan. On the third floor there were shops selling jewelry. The Ramazanov family lived on the fourth floor.

"Mugham nights" were organized from time to time on the wooden balcony of the building. The patterned balcony was the resting place of the Ramazanovs. The patterns on this balcony have an interesting symbolic meaning. Thus, the leaf-shaped patterns on the balcony symbolize that Baku is a windy city. The house where the Ramazanov family lived was divided into separate apartments during the Soviet era and distributed among the population.

== Gallery ==
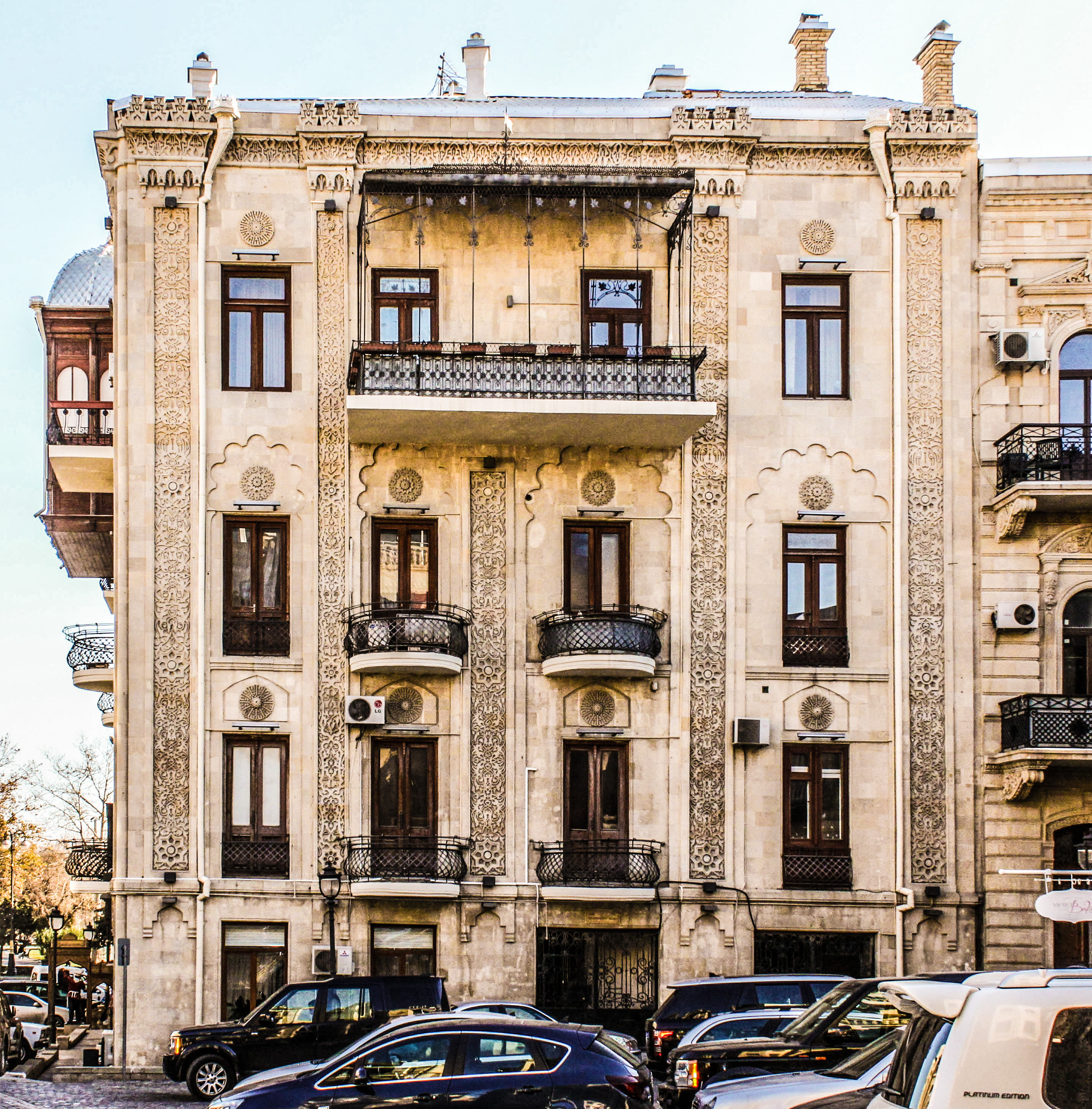

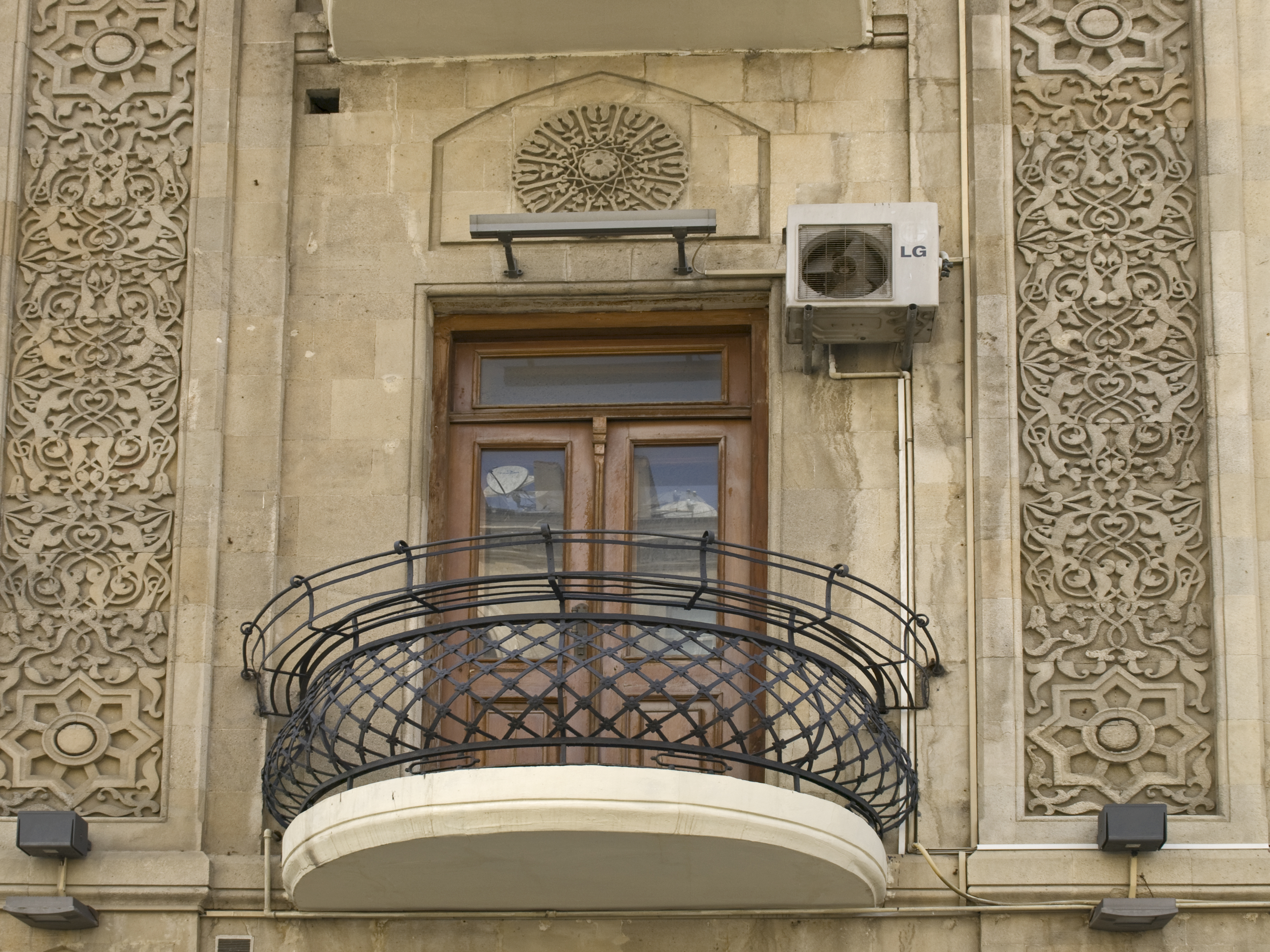

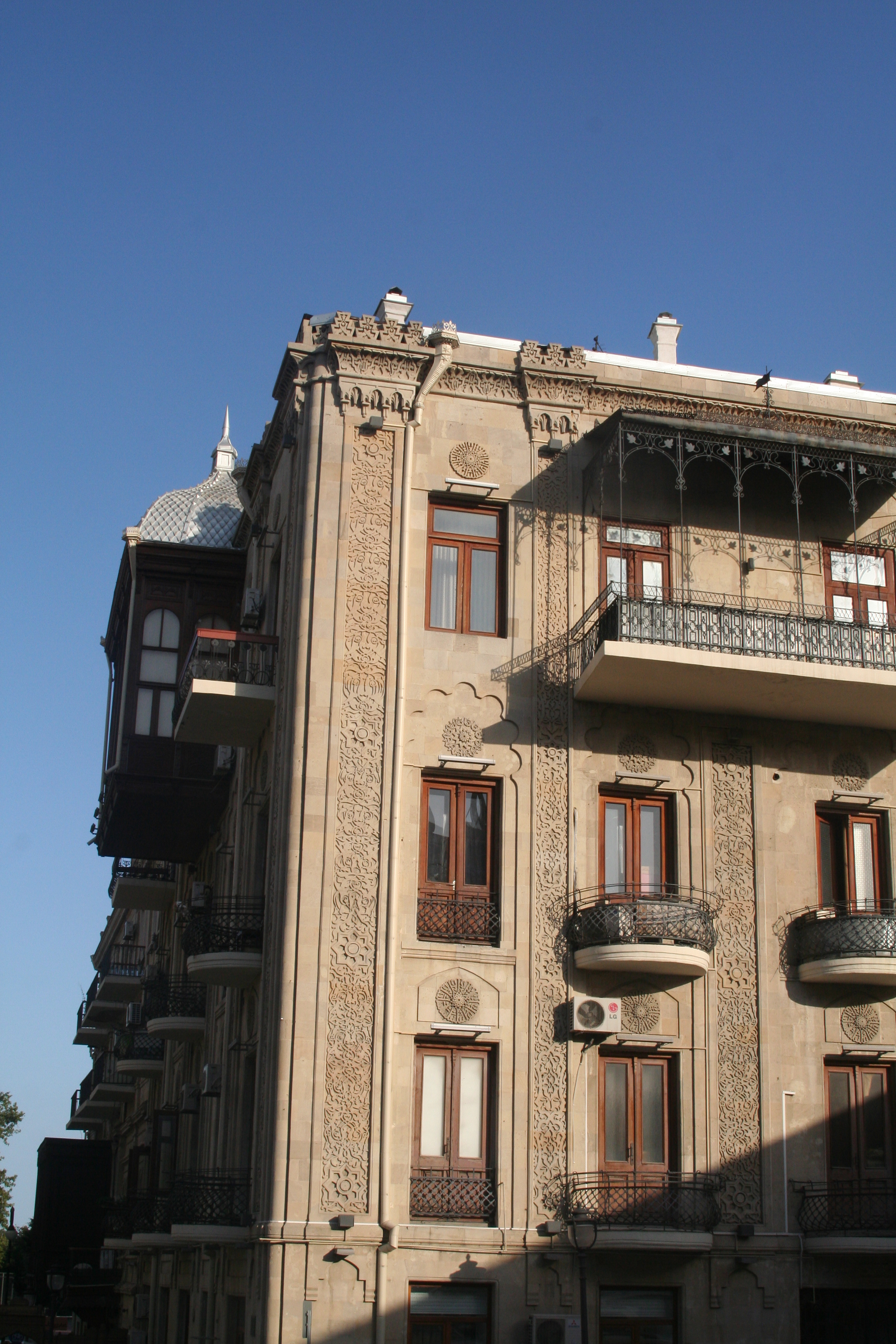

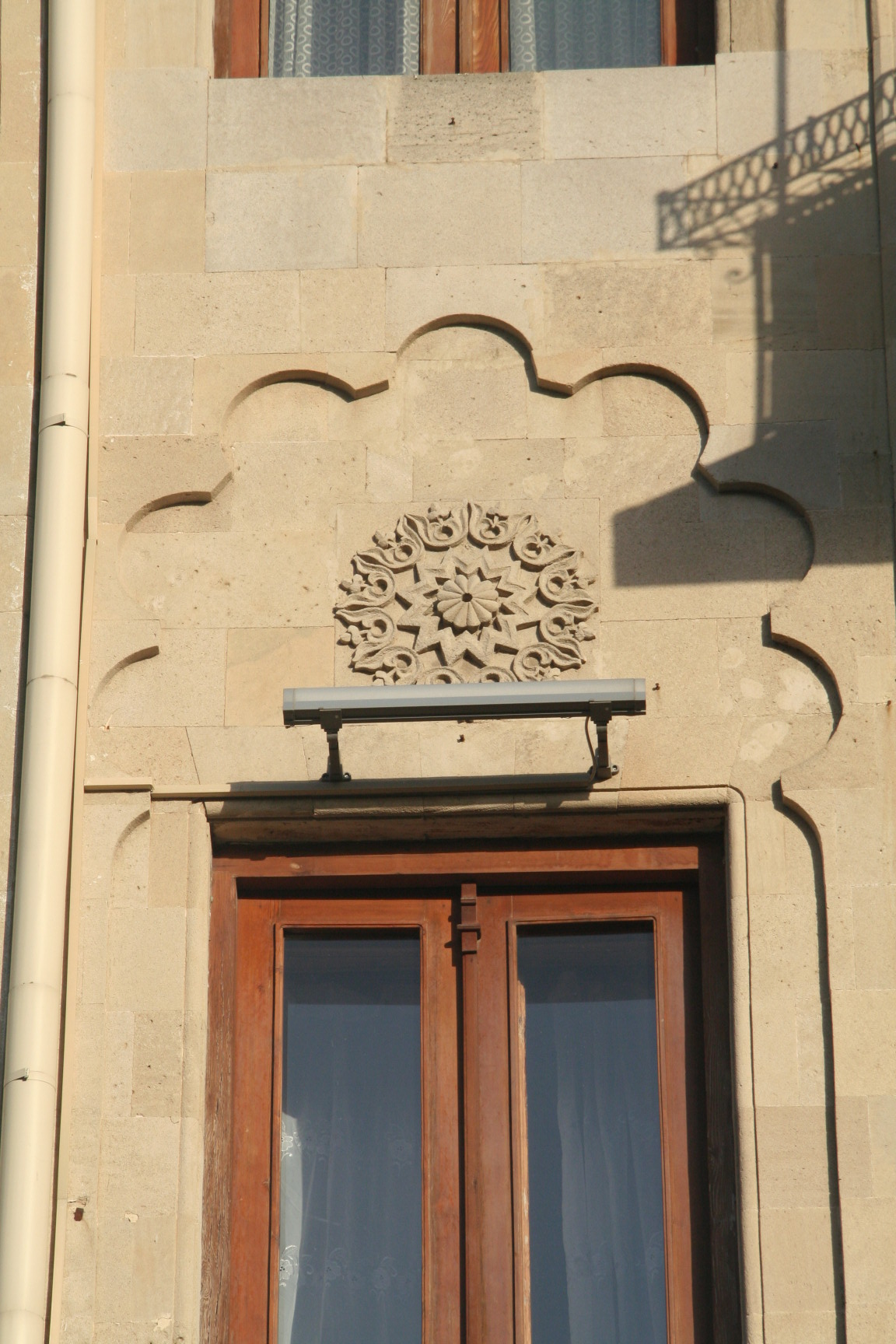

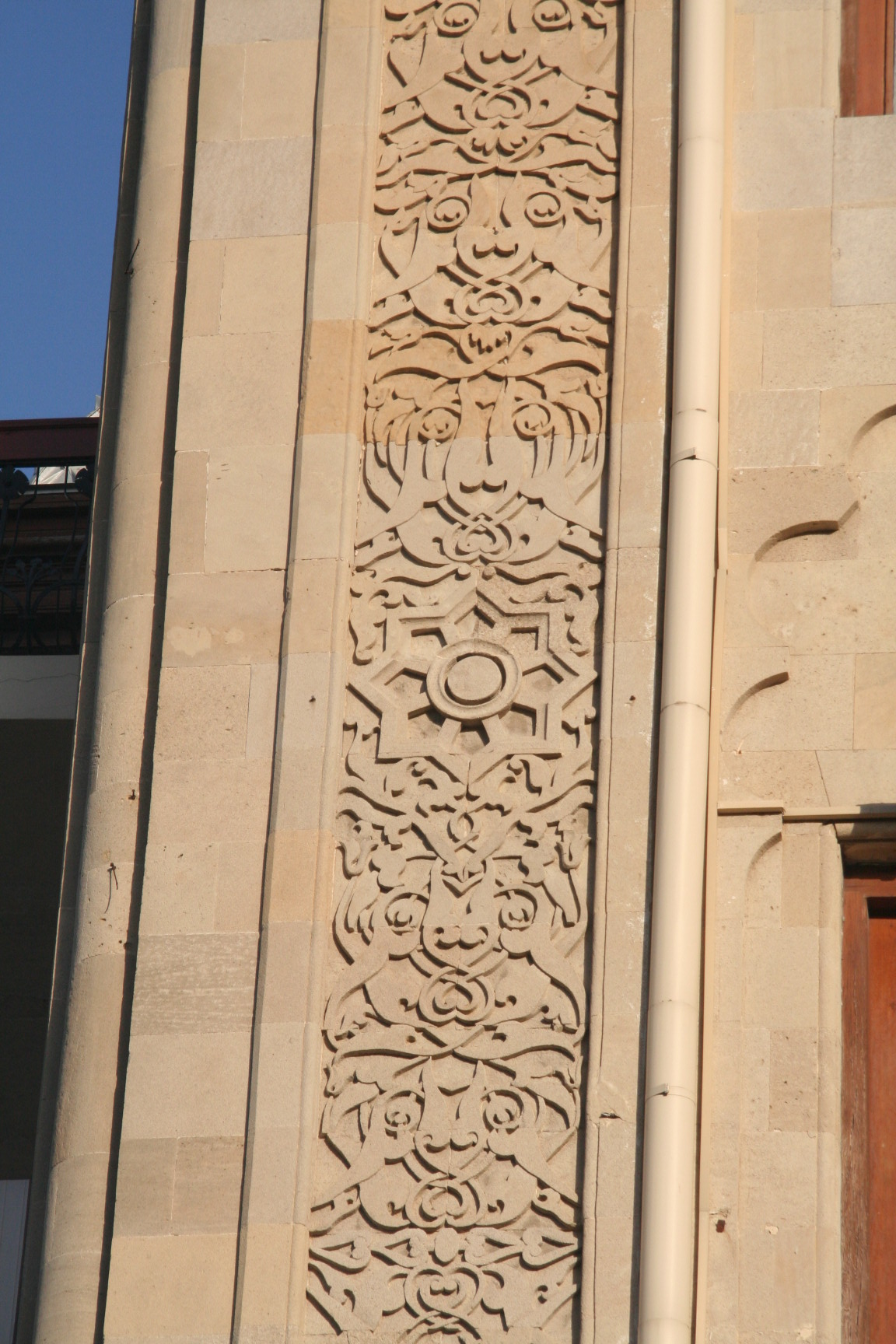

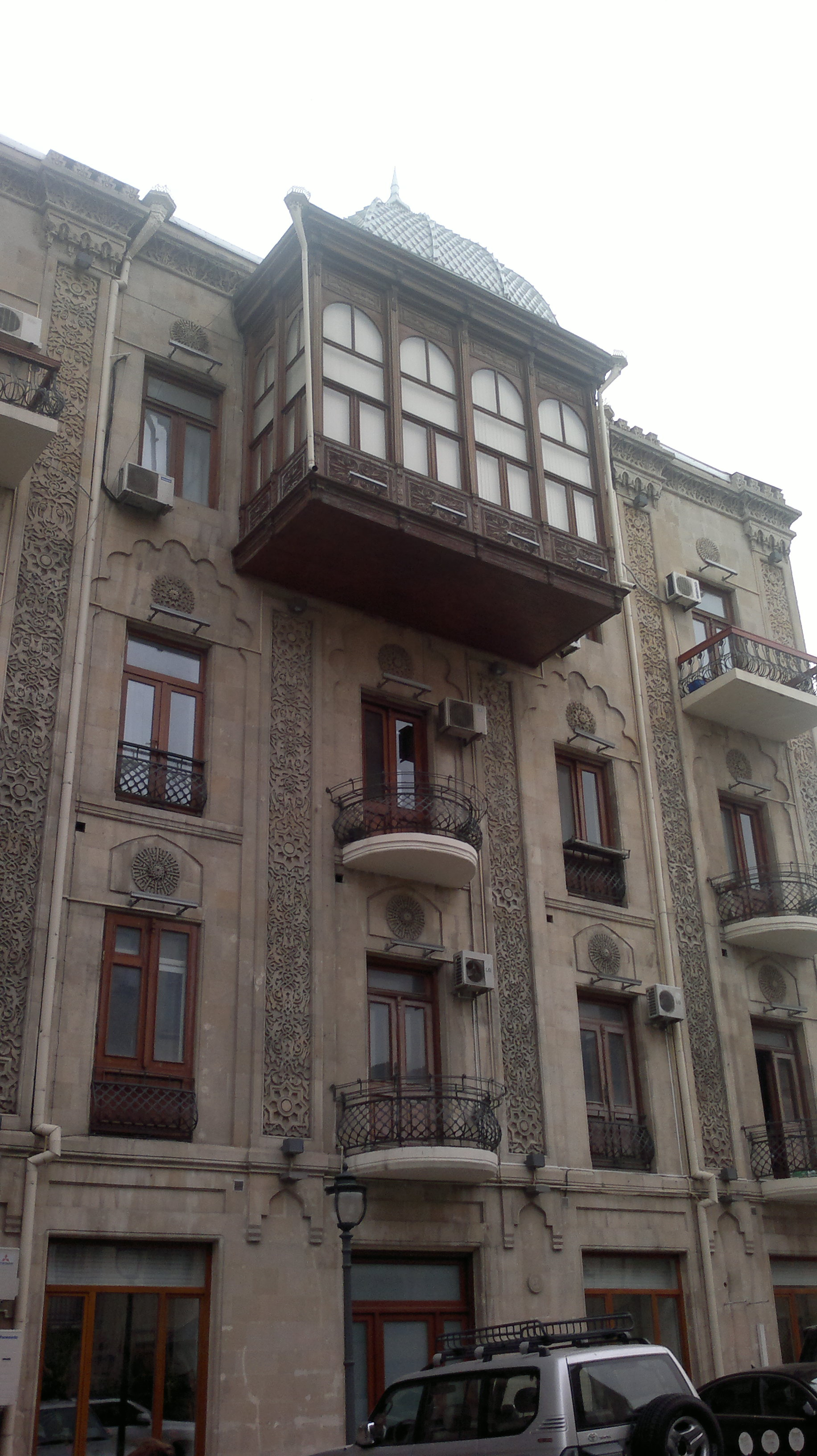

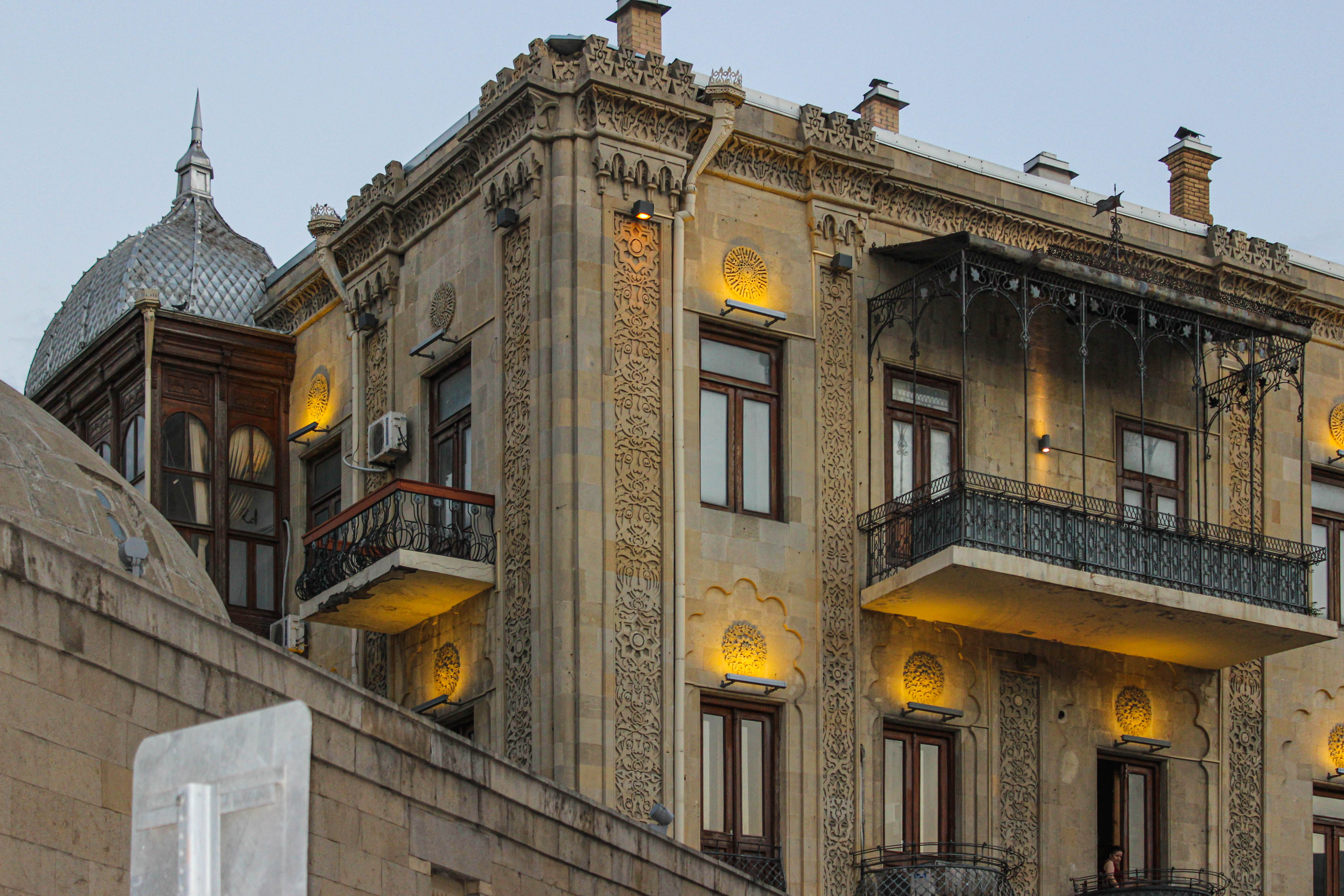

== See also ==
- Ismailiyya Palace
- Mitrofanov Residence
- Property of Haji Mustafa Rasulov
