= Anton Kandinov =

Azerbaijani architect

Russian: Кандинов Антон Семенович
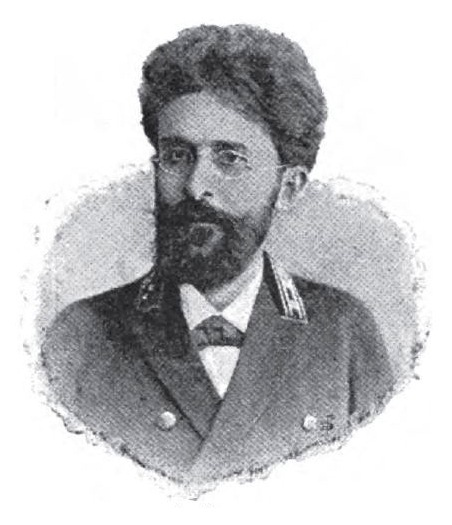
- Born: 15 March 1857; Tiflis Governorate
- Died: 4 March 1926; Ryazan
- Occupation: Architect
- Buildings: Islamiyya caravanserai Winter club (Baku)

Anton Kandinov (15 March 1857, Tiflis province – 4 March 1926, Ryazan) was an architect who worked in Baku in 1881-1891 and was responsible for the Islamiyya caravanserai, the Winter club, as well as more than other 40 buildings.

== Life and work ==
Kandinov Anton Semyonovich was born in 1857. He received his primary and secondary education at home. In 1876 he entered the St. Petersburg Institute of Civil Engineers, from which he graduated in 1881 with the first category. After the graduation until 1891, he worked in Baku as a city architect. In 1890, under the leadership of Kandinov, the building of the Winter Club was built in Baku. In 1891 he left his post. During his work in Baku, he was the architect of more than 40 buildings.

At the beginning of the 20th century, Kandinov moved to Ryazan Province. Subsequently, in 1904–1909, his name was listed in the Lists of institutions and officials of the Ryazan province. On 25 May 1912, Kandinov was elected a full member of the Ryazan Scientific Archive Commission. In 1913, he became a member of the Ryazan Noble Deputy Assembly. In the same year, Kandinov built an extension to the main building of the Ryazan Diocesan Women School, which housed additional classrooms. In April 1914, the building of the City Bank was laid in Ryazan, and on 15 December 1917, Kandinov presented the bank's board with a final inventory of the work performed. He died on 4 March 1926 in Ryazan from pneumonia.

On 23 May 2020, the historic wooden house in which Kandinov lived (Ryazan, 62 Svobody Street) was demolished.

== See also ==
- Dmitri Buynov
- Józef Płoszko
- Gasim bey Hajibababeyov
