= Isa bek Hajinski House =

House of Hajinski
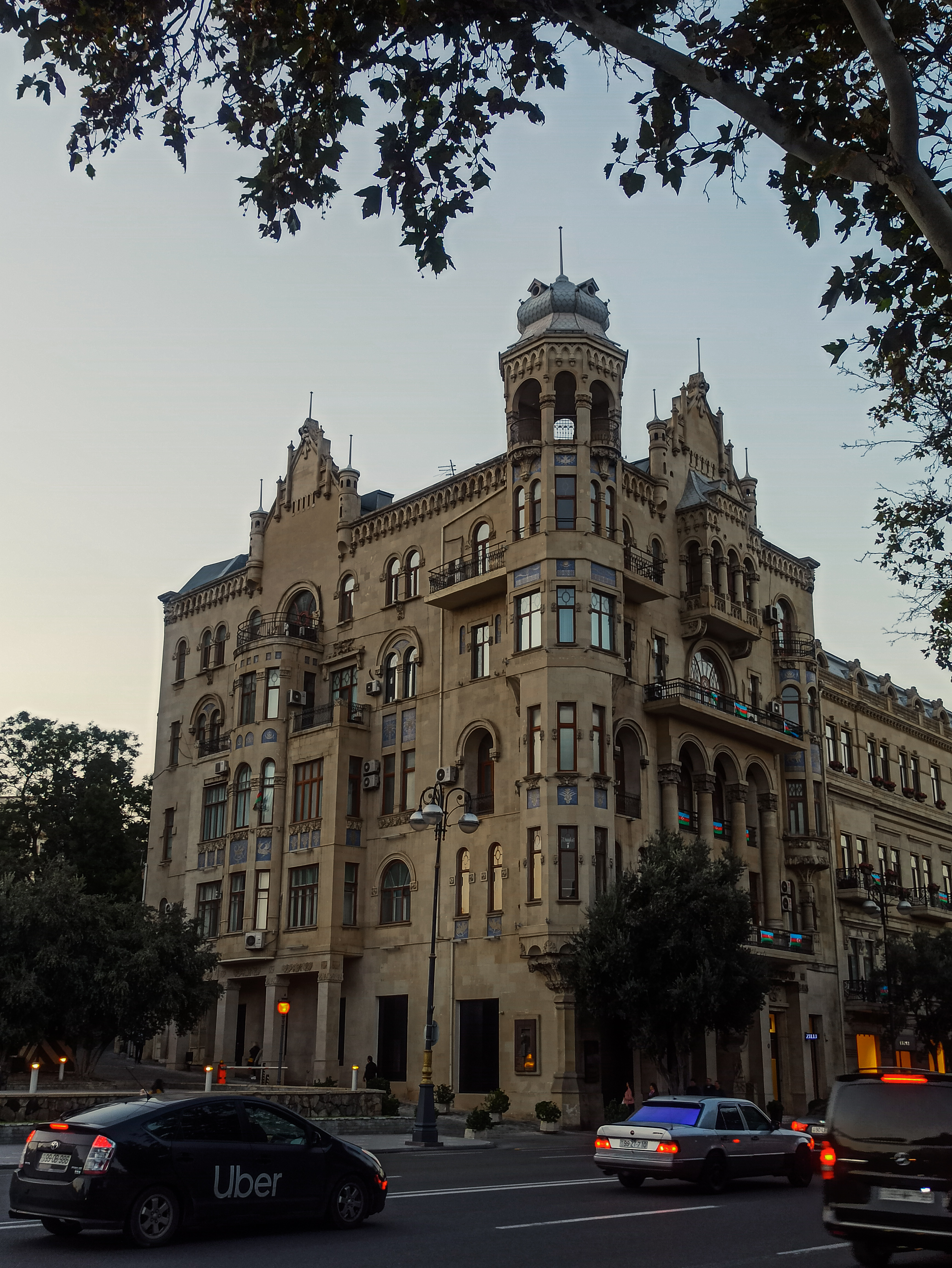
- Interactive map of the House of Hajinski area

General information
- Type: Mansion
- Architectural style: Eclecticism, Assyrian style
- Location: 103 Neftchilar ave, Sabail, Baku, Azerbaijan
- Coordinates: 40°21′58″N 49°50′16″E
- Construction started: 1910
- Completed: 1912
- Owner: Isa Bey Hajinski

Design and construction
- Architect: Misak Ter-Krikoryants

Isa bek Hajinski House or the House of Hajinski is located near the Maiden's Tower in Sabail, Baku. The architect of the House of Hajinski was Misak Ter-Krikoryants.

== Architecture ==
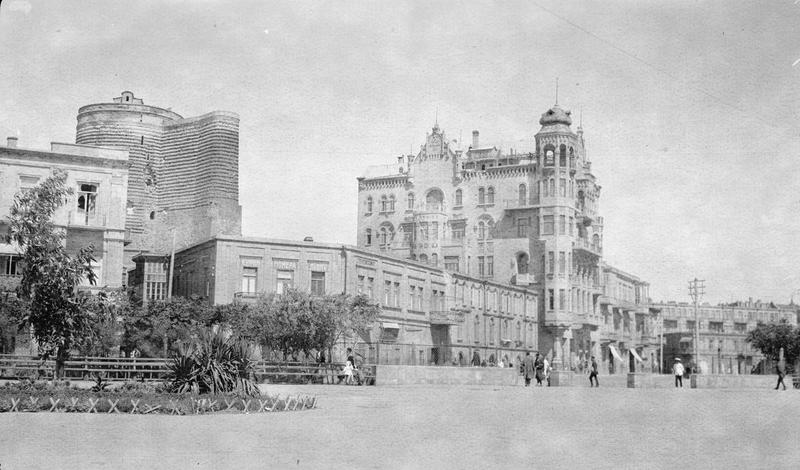
A panorama view of Hajinski's Mansion in right and Maiden Tower in left

The Hajinski residence reflected the status, position and colossal authority of its owner. The house was modeled after a house of cards. The lightness and airiness of its shape, emphasised by the seven spires of different height, the brilliantly designed corner façade, with its colourful tower and rich architectural décor carried out in the best traditions, and mosaic works in the style of ancient Assyria create a fantastic impression and take you to a fairytale world. The irrepressible fancy of the owner, the refined taste of the architect and the high quality of the construction created an authentic masterpiece of pure Baku architecture which managed to absorb and organically synthesise the influences of very different cultures.

The Hajinski residence became separated apartments during the Soviet period.

It is comforting that today the façade of the Hajinski House is decorated with memorial plaques dedicated to its outstanding inhabitants and guests. However, today no original reminders of the owner of the house survive, although in old photos, it is possible to see Arabic and Cyrillic script, which displays the name of Isa Bey Hajinski carved on the stone on two of its facades. These elements of the décor completely disappeared in Soviet era, and have never been restored.

Until recently the Hajinski House was in a deplorable state. In the 2007 repair work, some mosaic adornments and elements of the décor were partly reconstructed. Unfortunately, this restoration did not affect a number of the important elements of the façade, such as the triangular balconies of the second floor of the apartment, where De Gaulle and Mammadaliyev resided. The inscriptions of the name of the owner and the colourful tiles of the central tower were changed into monotonous metallic sheets of a silver colour, which do not at all enhance the façade.

Prior to the 1940s, the building was renamed as "Hacinski's House". But priorities change, and later, as analogues of the Stalin buildings in Moscow (although these houses are built in a different style, they have common features in terms of luxury), it was called a "coastal home."

== Famous occupants ==
In November 1944 during the Second World War, General De Gaulle stayed in the Hajinski House on the way from Tehran to Moscow and in a later period the same apartment was inhabited by the family of the outstanding scientist and chemist and twice President of the National Academy of Sciences of Azerbaijan Yusif Heydar oghlu Mammadaliyev, whose hundredth anniversary was formally celebrated by UNESCO in 2005.

It was mostly occupied by middle-class party workers, as well as several petrochemical scientists. The famous corner of the building was empty - it was reserved for special guests. In 1944, one of the special guests was Charles de Gaulle, the temporary head of the French government at that time. At that time, the Soviet Information Bureau wrote: "On 14 November, the Chief of the French Government, General de Gaulle arrived in Baku together with the accompanying persons, including the members of the Government of the USSR and General of the Collective Security Treaty Organization and an honorary guard at the airport decorated with the flags of France and the Soviet Union, and the orchestra performed the hymns of France and the USSR, and General de Gaulle watched the Koroglu opera at the Azerbaijan Opera Theater.

There is another memorial in the building. There was outstanding scientist and first academician Yusif Mammadaliyev in the field of chemistry. At that time, Mammadaliyev was the one who created the best high-flammable fuel and thus made a great contribution to science. He took his apartment here in the years after the war. The point is that Mammadaliyev, who studied and worked at the Moscow State University before the war, returned to the Azerbaijan Institute of Oil Research after returning to Baku. Here, he has made some of the most significant inventions for the front. An example is the improvement of the quality of Soviet fuel. Thanks to this fuel, the famous T-34 tanks have become the fastest tanks of the Second World War. Soon, Mammadaliyev was provided with a flat from the third floor of the coastal house, as the head of the laboratory. The scientist lived all his life there. In the 50s, Mammadaliyev began his education at the Azerbaijan University named after Kirov, first assistant professor, then professor, chief of the department and finally rector (1954-1958).

== See also ==
- Alibeyovs’ House
- Kerbalai Israfil Hajiyev’s Mansion
- Mitrofanov Residence
