= Alibeyovs' House =

Alibeyovs’ House
- Azerbaijani: Əlibəyovların evi
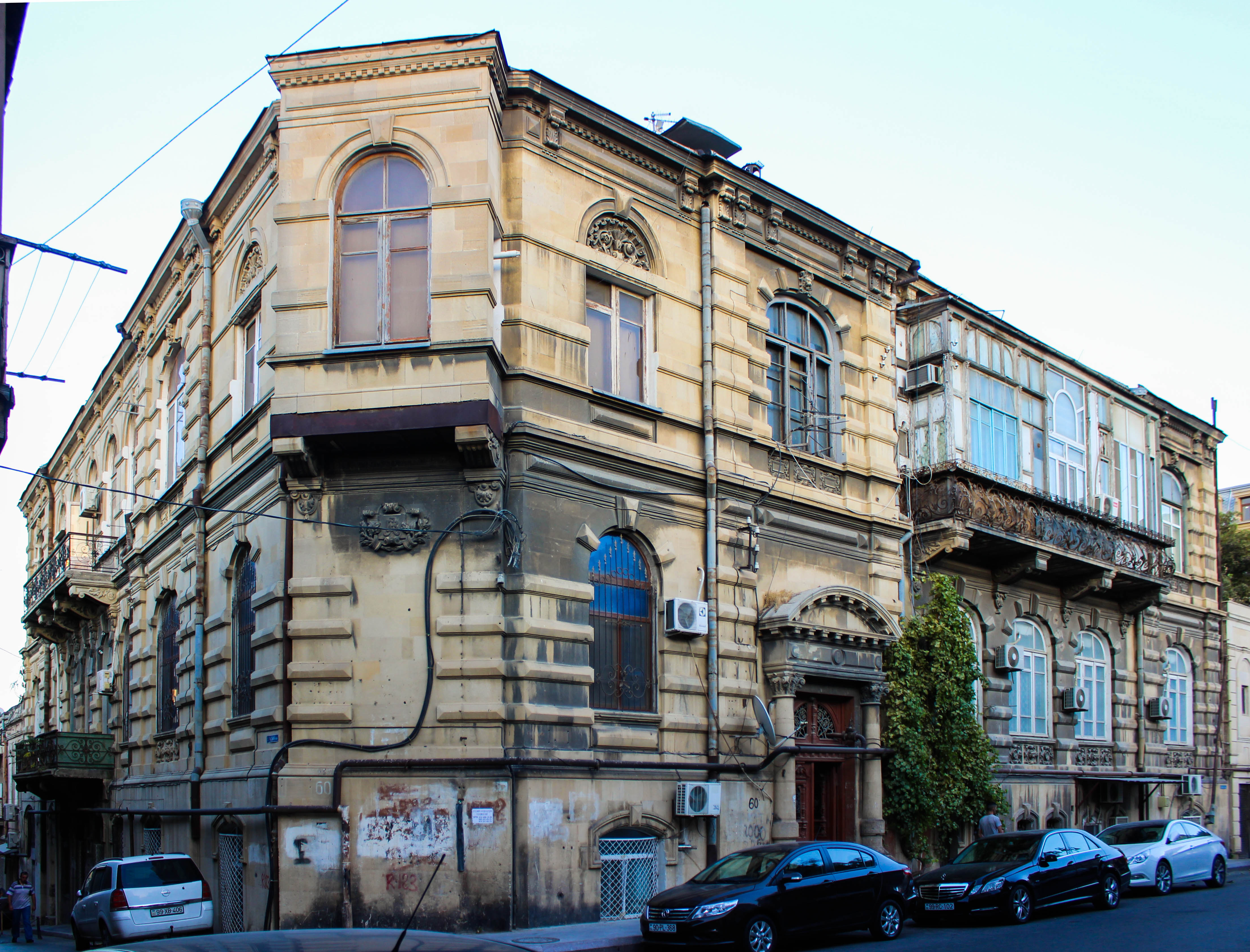

General information
- Location: 4 Rza Guliyev lane, Baku, Yasamal, Baku, Azerbaijan
- Coordinates: 40°22′15″N 49°49′48″E
- Completed: 1903

Design and construction
- Architect: Nikolai Prokofiev

The Alibeyovs’ House is a residential building located in Baku at the intersection of 4 Rza Guliyev lane (former Karaulny lane) and 60 Suleiman Tagizade street (former Pochtovaya street).

== History ==
Rza-bek Alibekov, by whose order the edifice was built, received his medical education in Kazan. Then he graduated with a gold medal from the Faculty of Law in St. Petersburg. The medal was presented to him personally by the Emperor Nicholas II. While studying in St. Petersburg, Alibekov met the architect Nikolai Prokofiev to whom he later ordered the construction of the house.

The building was built in 1903 according to the project of the Academician N. Prokofiev who noted in his projects notes that the building on 60 Pochtovaya Street in Baku, among dense residential quarters, with a corner solution and with an inner courtyard, according to the layout meets the Baku traditions of the early 20th century.

On relief, the building fits into the structure of the historic quarters of the city both in the volumetric modeling and in the architectural interpretation, and serves as an interesting example of a highly aesthetic solution of a residential building. The Alibekovs House is distinguished by its volumetric plasticity thanks to the clear vertical edges of the bay window and the angular positions of the facades. The main facade is executed in a classic technique. The clear vertical divisions bring a certain order to the architectural composition, and the symmetrical southern facade is expressed by slightly underlined projections. The three-story building develops in a calm rhythm of the volumetric masses with the participation of large window openings in combination with the scale proportions and the spatial position. A new attitude of building the facade is observed.

The main volumetric elements of the building define the portal of the main entrance and the balcony-shushebend (glazed veranda) on the second floor. The entrance's portal consists of a two-column composition of the Corinthian order with the corresponding elements of a plastic nature. The entrance is directly emphasized by a semicircular arch, double-leaf door leaves. On the facade, the portal convincingly enters and actively participates in shaping the volumetric system of the stone plastics. The preservation of the edifices aesthetic value is largely facilitated by the architectural details, the so-called elements of the second order.

The interior space of the residential building is especially saturated with artistically executed interiors including the vast lobby of the two-story staircase outside the front rooms, ornamented with decorative panels with landscapes and genre scenes made by the architects-designers and painters who worked here. From the mezzanine, a wide glazed corner gallery leads to all the ceremonial rooms.

The richness of forms and elements, the variety of techniques and sculptural motifs reveal the artistic side of the edifice. The building occupies an important place in the work of the St. Petersburg architect, it is part of the architectural heritage and an architectural monument.

== Gallery ==
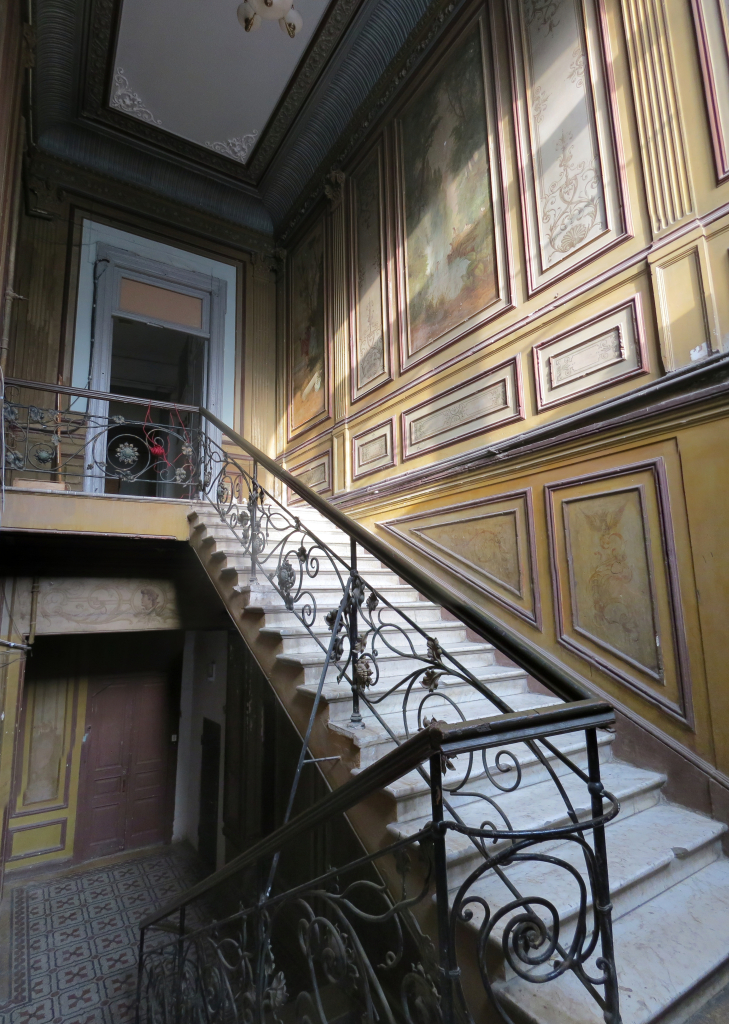

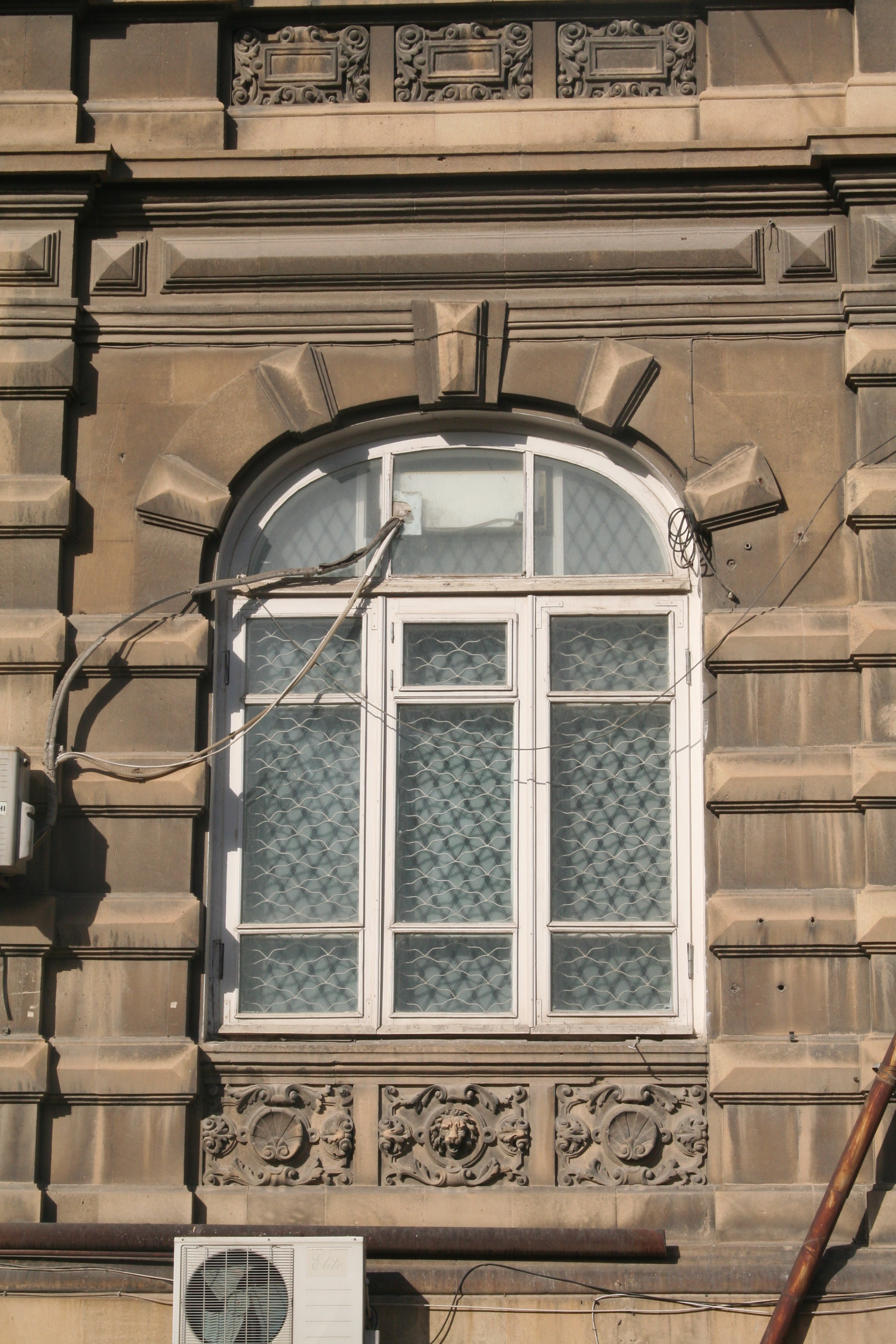

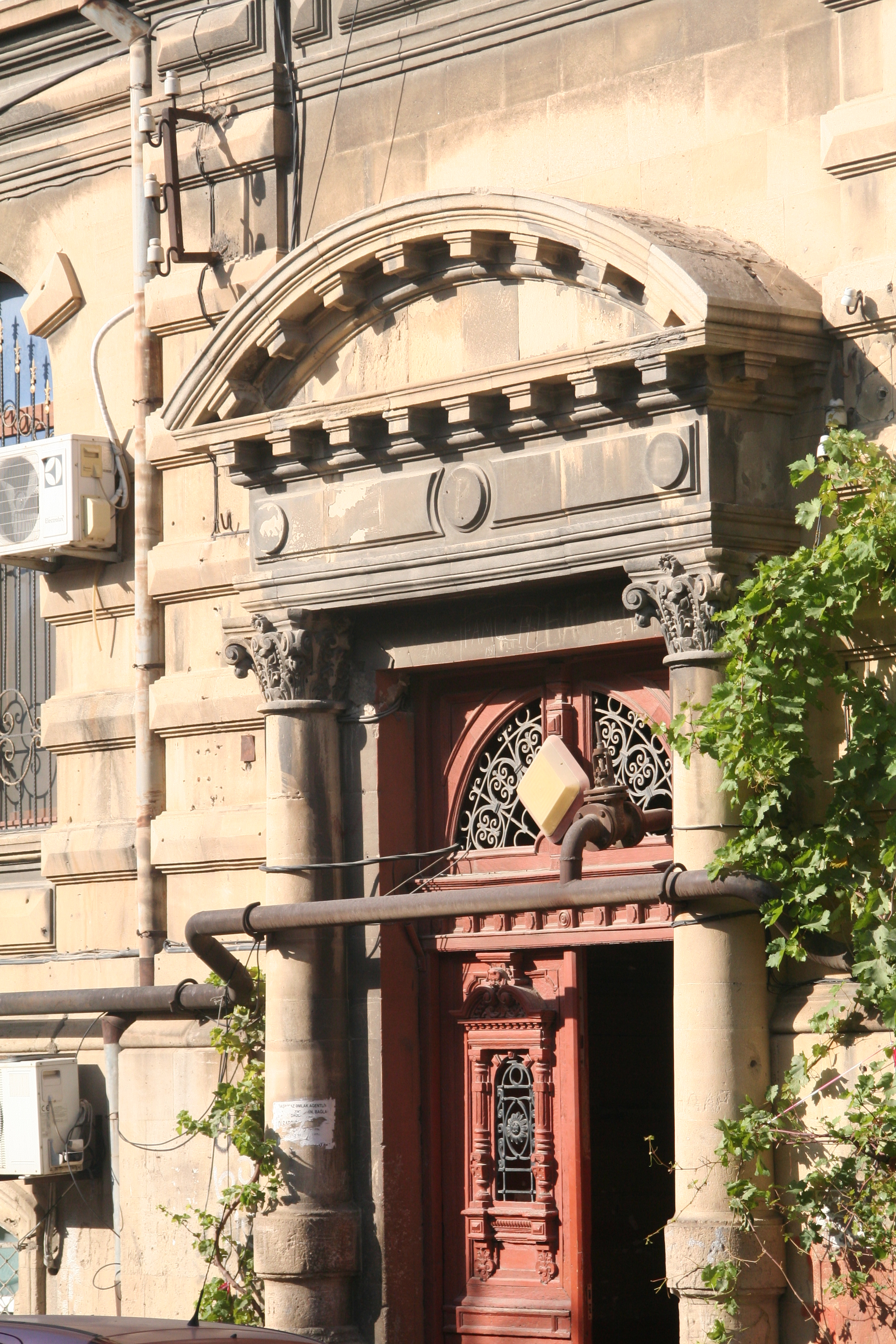

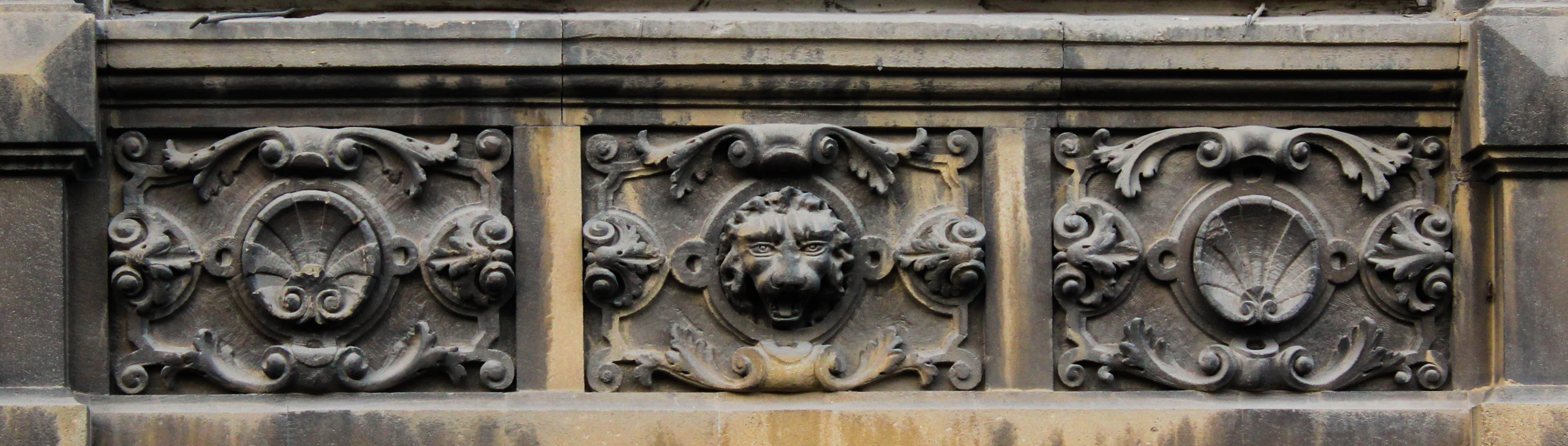

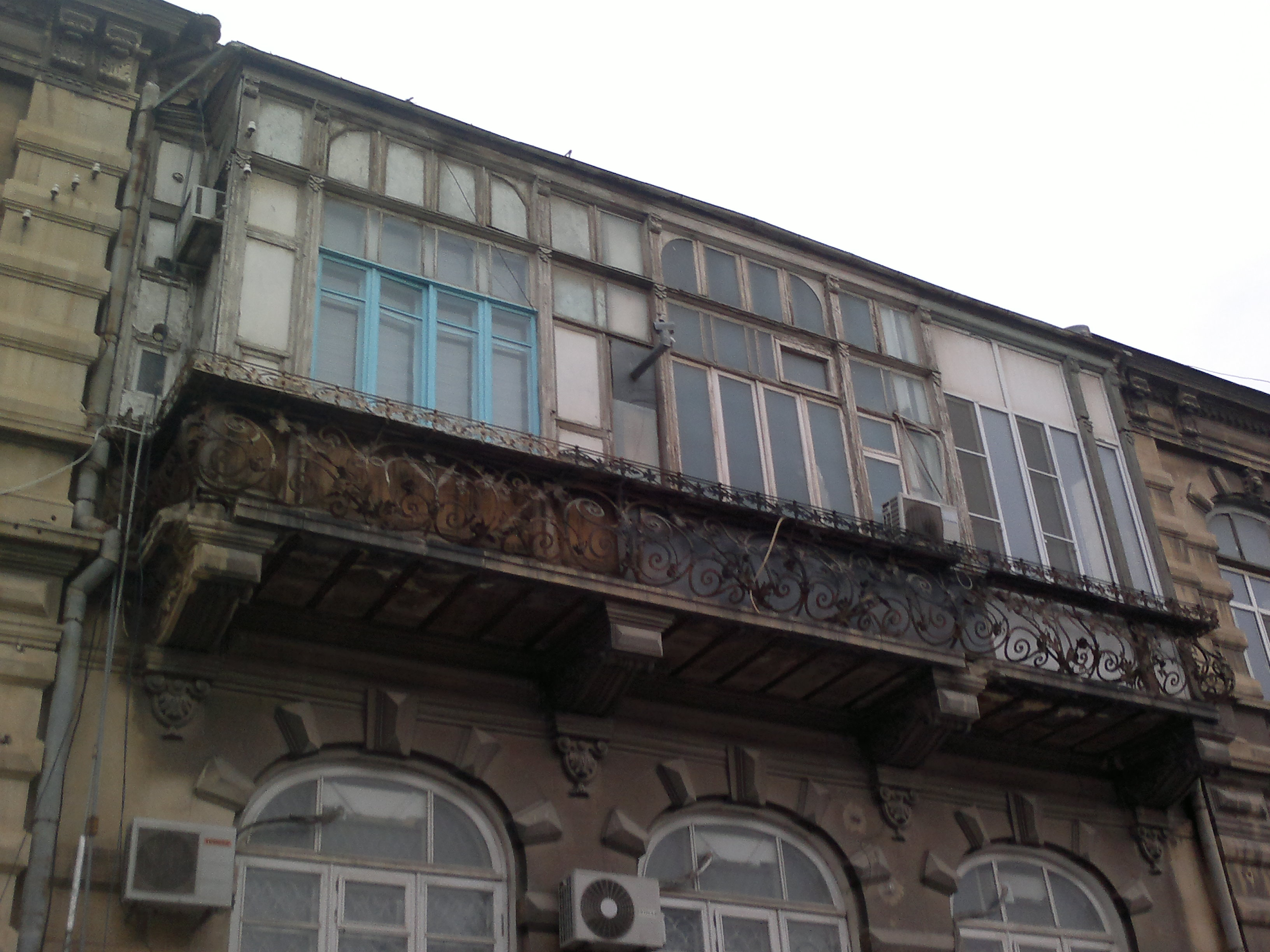

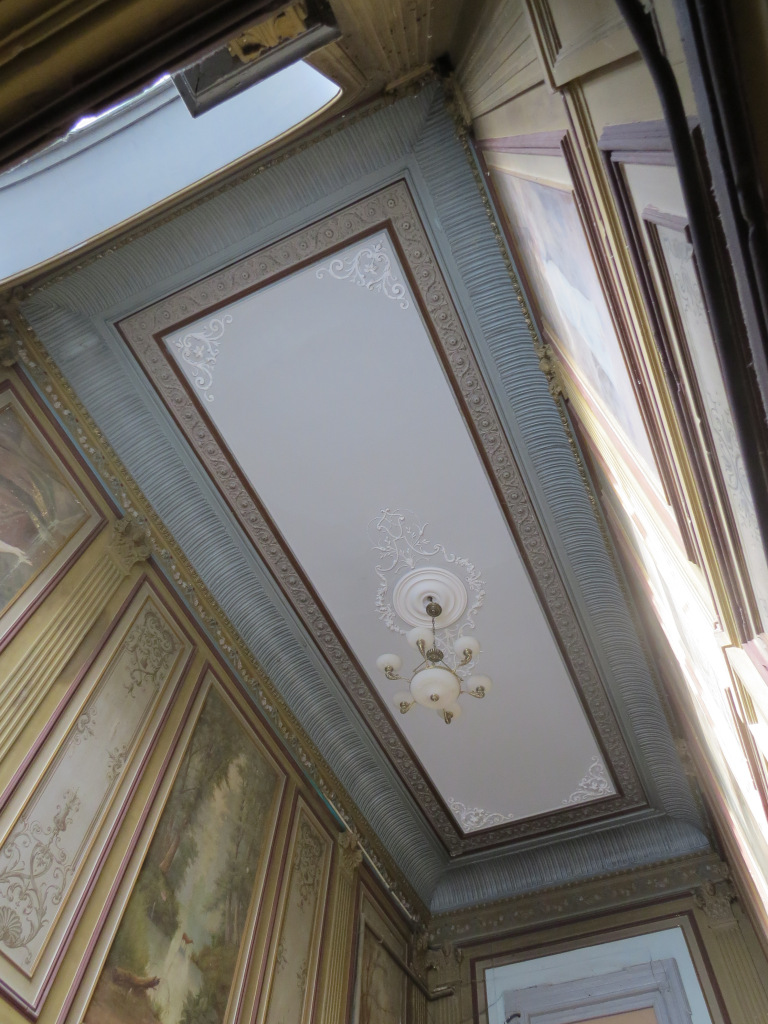

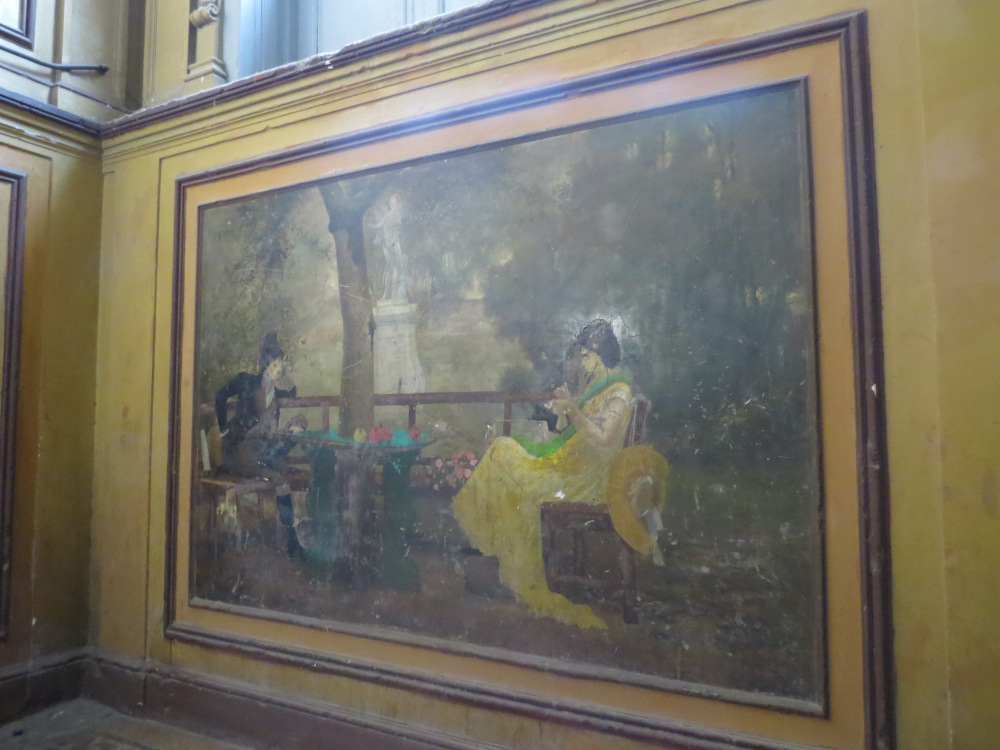

== See also ==
- Isa bek Hajinski House
- Kerbalai Israfil Hajiyev’s Mansion
- Mikado Cinematography building
- Mitrofanov Residence
- Property of Haji Mustafa Rasulov
