= Kerbalai Israfil Hajiyev's Mansion =

Kerbalai Israfil Hajiyev’s Mansion
- Azerbaijani: Kərbəlayi İsrafil Hacıyevin evi Polish: Dwór Kerbałaja Israfila Hajijewa
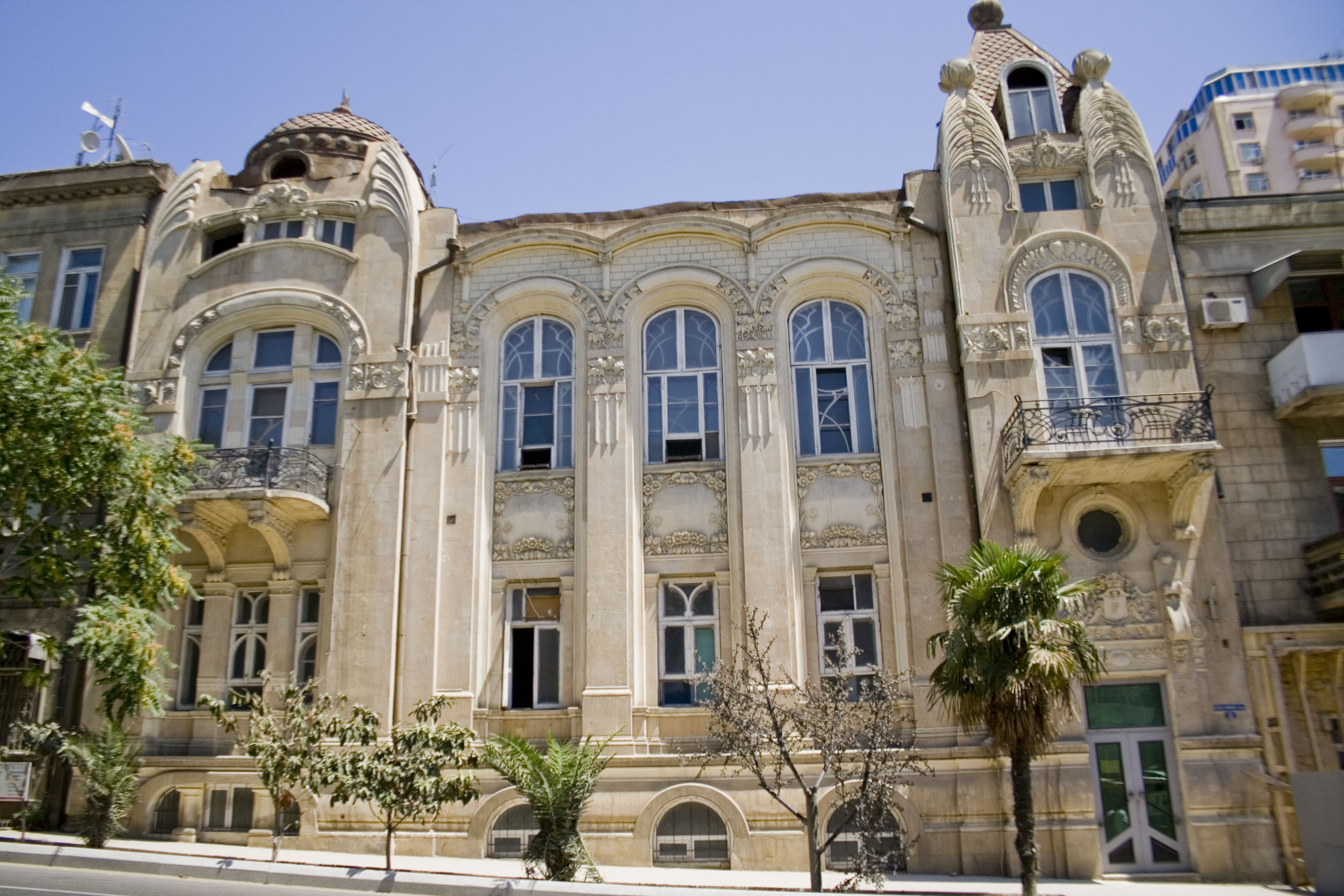
- Interactive map of the Kerbalai Israfil Hajiyev’s Mansion area

General information
- Location: 12 Jafar Jabbarli Str., Baku, Yasamal, Baku, Azerbaijan
- Coordinates: 40°22′49″N 49°49′49″E
- Construction started: 1910
- Completed: 1912

Design and construction
- Architect: Józef Płoszko

The Kerbalai Israfil Hajiyev's Mansion (Azerbaijani: Kərbəlayi İsrafil Hacıyevin evi, Polish: Dwór Kerbałaja Israfila Hajijewa) is a building situated on 12 Jafar Jabbarli Street in the Yasamal district of Baku. It was built by the Polish architect Józef Płoszko.

By the order of the Cabinet of Ministers of the Republic of Azerbaijan, dated with 2 August 2001, the building was taken under state protection as an architectural monument of history and culture of national importance (No: 171).

== Description ==
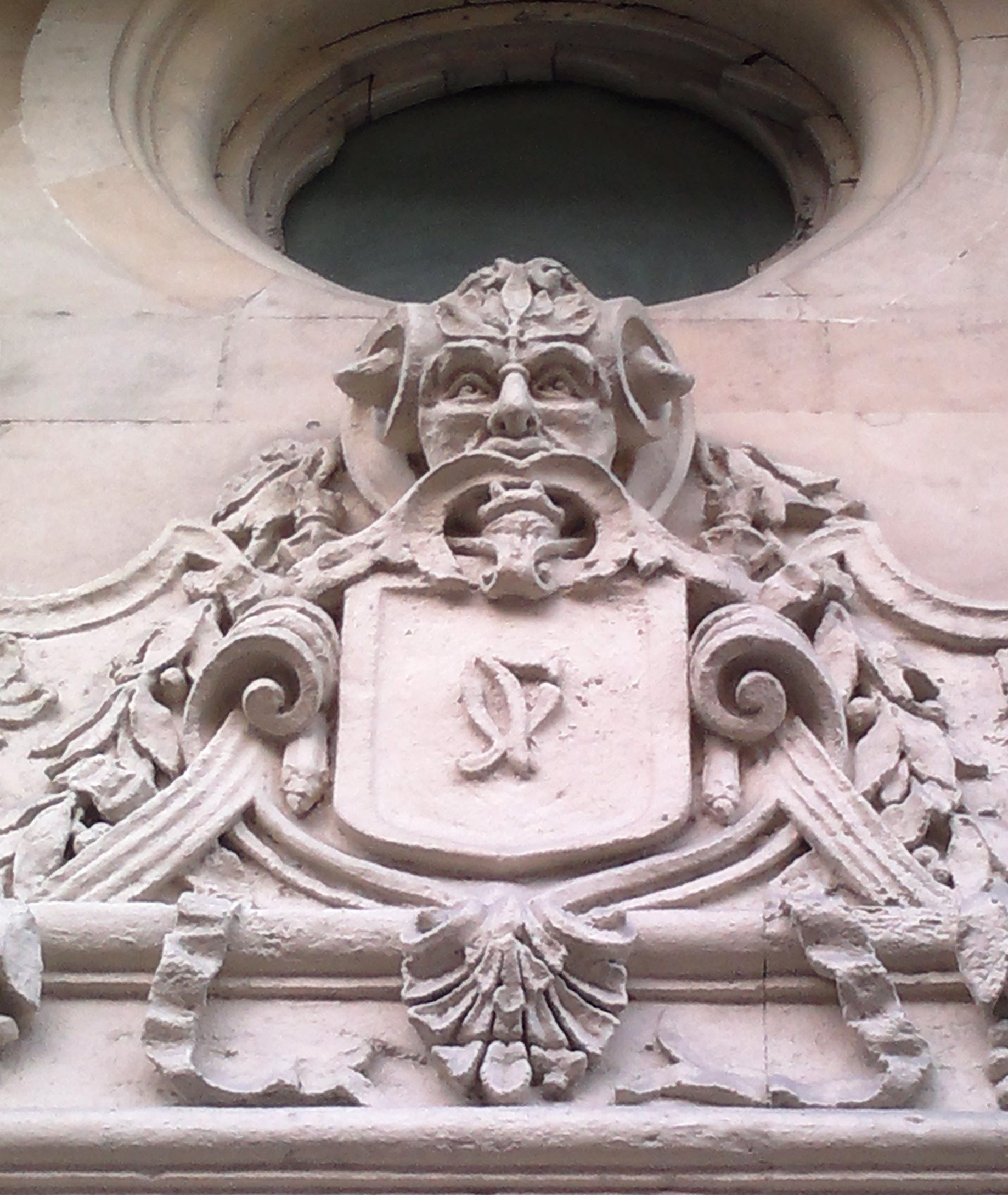
The Facade details above the door

The building was built in 1910-1912 by the civil engineer Józef Płoszko. The modeling of the bulk masses in the composition of the building speaks of the classical divisions traditions violation. The composition scheme is quite dynamic and has the features inherent to the bright modernity. The façade's structure with two tower-like ends of flanking projections, characteristic lines of arches, floor openings, profiles inherent to Art Nouveau, and the richness of details created a special architecture do not violating the overall harmony. The Baku Art Nouveau is distinguished from Moscow and St. Petersburg Art Nouveau (with their molding of concrete and plaster), by a special drawing of ornamental motives of the tympanum of arches, completed projections, individual architectural details conveyed by the deep relief of stone carving. The plasticity of the facade continues in the broken line of the cornice, the perspective solution of the arched openings and in the very plane of the wall with the architectural details of the Art Nouveau.

The building's interior is distinguished by a marble front staircase, thin characteristic lines of the cornice pattern, plafonds and doors with stained-glass windows. A particular attention is drawn to the cabinet ceiling.

The building is an architectural monument and an integral part of the historical heritage of the city.

== See also ==
- Alibeyovs’ House
- Mitrofanov Residence
- Property of Haji Mustafa Rasulov
