= Dmitri Buynov =

Azerbaijani architect

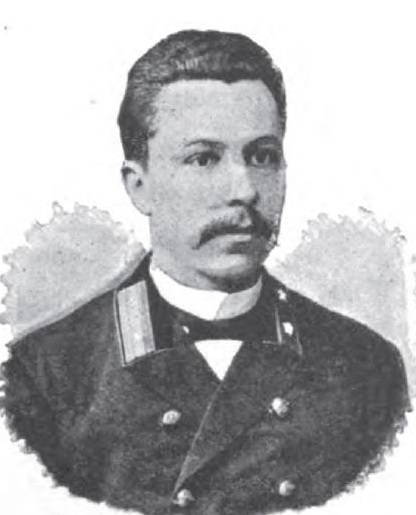
- Born: 6 August 1859; Baku, Shemakha Governorate, Russian Empire
- Died: Unknown
- Education: Baku Real School
- Occupation: Architect
- Buildings: Baku real school building The building of St. Nina Girls' gymnasium

Dmitri Dmitrievich Buynov (Russian: Дмитрий Дмитриевич Буйнов; 6 August 1859 – 1916 at the earliest) was a Russian architect who was born and worked in Baku. He is the architect of the building of the Baku Real School and the building of the St. Nina Girls' Gymnasium.

== Life and activities ==
Dmitri Buynov was born in 1859 in Baku (now Azerbaijan). His father, Dmitri, was the head of the 2nd Baku Treasury Department. He received his first education in Baku Real School. In 1878, he entered the Construction School, and after graduating in 1884, he received the rank of first-class civil engineer. He started his career as a junior engineer in Volynsk province. There, in 1884–1886, he built five wooden bridges over the Viliyu and Gorin rivers in the city of Ostroh.

In 1886, he started working in the construction department of the Baku governorate administration. In 1889, he received the rank of titular adviser. In 1893, Dmitriy Buynov was appointed architect of Baku governorate. He worked in this position until 1900. Between 1886 and 1890, he built a building for the St. Nina Girls' Gymnasium on Nikolayev (now Istiglaliyet) Street. In 1900, Buynov was appointed engineer of the Baku governorate and worked in this position until 1907. During the years 1901–1904, he was engaged in the construction of a new building for the Baku real school according to his own project. In 1907–1908, Dmitry Buynov worked in Tiflis as a construction and road technician under the Viceroy of the Caucasus, and is also the chairman of the Technical Meeting at the Office of the Viceroy. In 1909, Buynov received the rank of real state councilor. In 1916 he became a member of the Audit Commission of the Caucasian District Directorate of the Russian Red Cross Society.

There is no information about the further fate of Dmitri Buynov.
