= Mitrofanov Residence =

Mansion in Baku, Azerbaijan

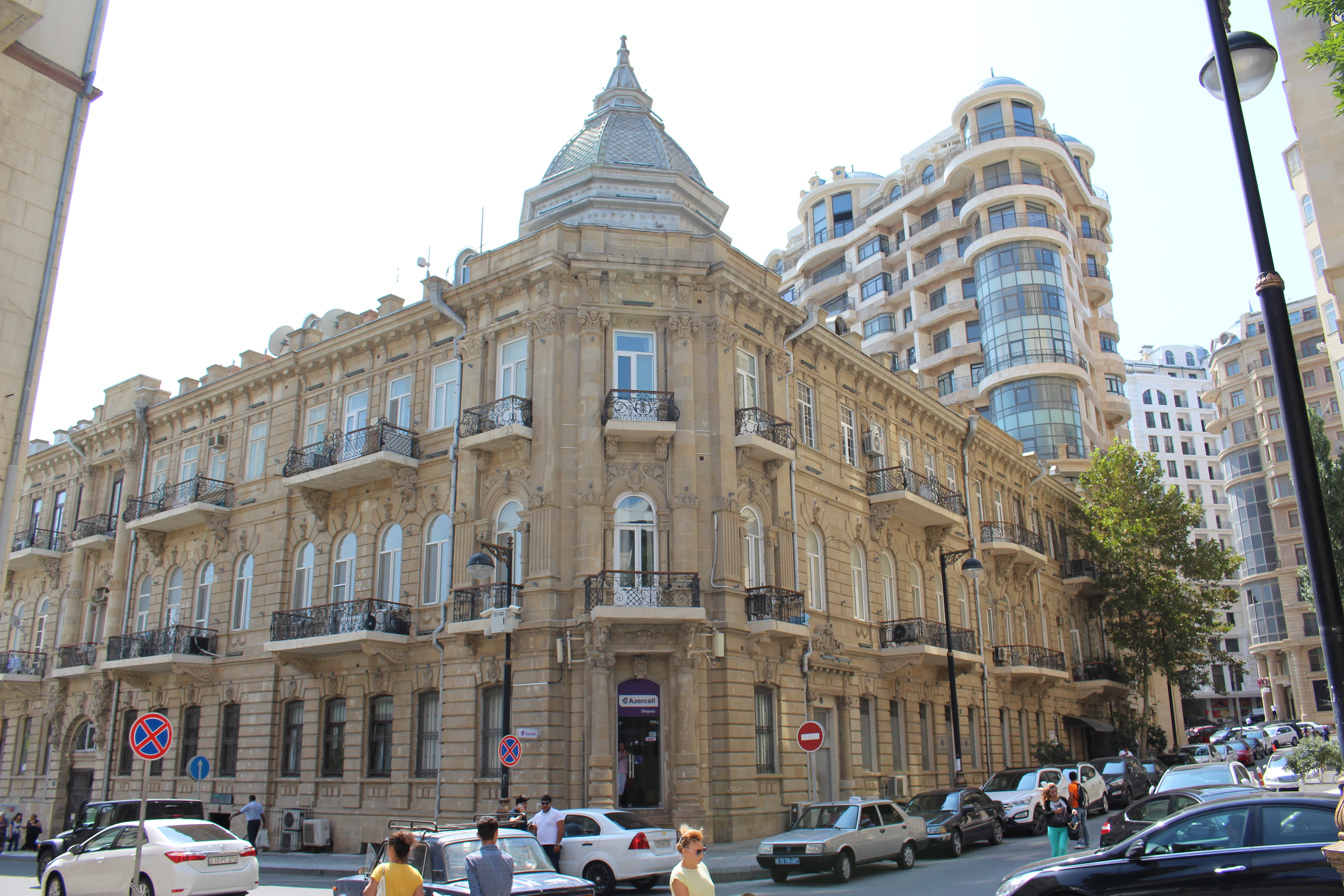
- Interactive map of the Mitrofanov Residence area

General information
- Type: Mansion
- Architectural style: French Renaissance Revival-style
- Location: 6 Hasan Abdullayev, Sabail, Baku, Azerbaijan
- Coordinates: 40°22′06″N 49°49′45″E
- Construction started: 1898
- Completed: 1902
- Owner: Dmitry Mitrofanov

Design and construction
- Architect: Johann Edel

Mitrofanov Residence (Azerbaijani: Mitrofanovun evi, German: Mitrofanow Residenz, Russian: Резиденция Митрофанова) is a mansion in Baku, capital of Azerbaijan. It was built by Dmitry D. Mitrofanov, a rich oil baron who employed the German architect Johann Edel as the architect for his residence. Construction took place between 1898 and 1902. The building was built in the French Renaissance Revival-style. Following the March 1918 events, the building was used by the Baku Commune. In 1919, during the short-lived Democratic Republic of Azerbaijan, the building housed the French Embassy. With the April 1920 invasion, the building was divided into apartments.

== History ==
Oil baron Dmitry Mitrofanov employed Iohan Edel as the architect for his huge, three-storey apartment (revenue) house on owned vast plots of lands located in the Baku City Duma division. The residence was built between 1898 and 1902. It was built by Baku citizens - the Gasimov brothers. The building has a corner layout, and the overall dimensions of the main façade are 25,90 and 61,50 meters. The multi-stage development of the housing design was described on the main façade. The area is a large triangle intersected in the northwest. Despite the cut (curved) shape, the rooms are arranged in two rows on the east, and north façades and divided into separate sections. The planning of separate apartments in the form of sections was furthermore widespread in Baku. The interior planning is exposed to vector development, a two-mid-flight ladder located in the strategic parts is clearly and exactly marked. The rooms in each apartment are separated for their functions and have their unique forms. On the border with neighboring properties, there is a single-storey building with windows facing the yard. The apartments in two rows have a traditional glassed gallery. The gallery is supported by open-style stairwells on the west and south sides.

Although the plan of the second floor repeats the features of the first, the apartments are located only on the side facing the street. The rooms are arranged in two rows and have halls for living and solemn receptions. The columnar side protrusions in the interior of the halls create a stage-like space. The indirect gallery on the second floor is divided between two apartments with a partition.

The proposed architectural composition for the façade is simple and serious compared to the later works of I.V. Edel. The style is tended to be Neo-Greek. It is distinguished by the large number of characteristic horizontal sections. The façade of the building is asymmetrical, the central part is convex and noticeable, so that the pilaster side of the right corner is not visible. The façade is reinforced on the second floor with Tuscan order pilasters. There are three windows between them, decorated with pilasters, as well as classic pediments on the sides. Profiled belts pass directly over them.

The rectangular shop spaces on the first floor are made of unsawn stone (rustication) masonry. The entrance to the yard is a metal grid and is along the axis of the central part. The architect managed to emphasize the importance of the central part by legally distributing the architectural composition of the facade on the first and second elements and strengthened it with a low attic. The pilaster side of the façade repeats the compositional method of the central fragment, where the architecturally designed, bracketed balconies are located in the appropriate convenient positions on the façade. The architect used a compact nomenclature of details and form elements to solve the façade composition.

== Photos ==
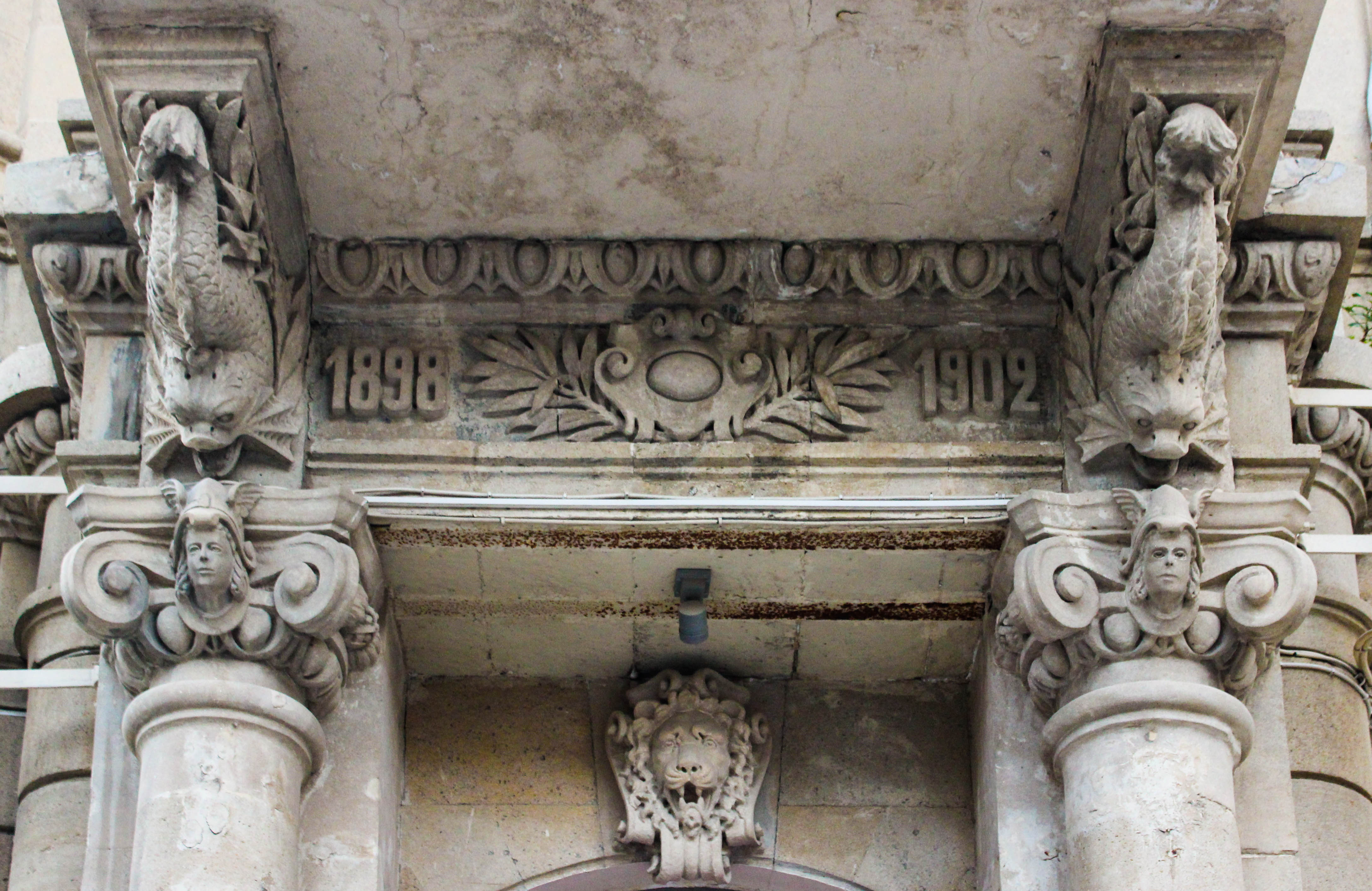

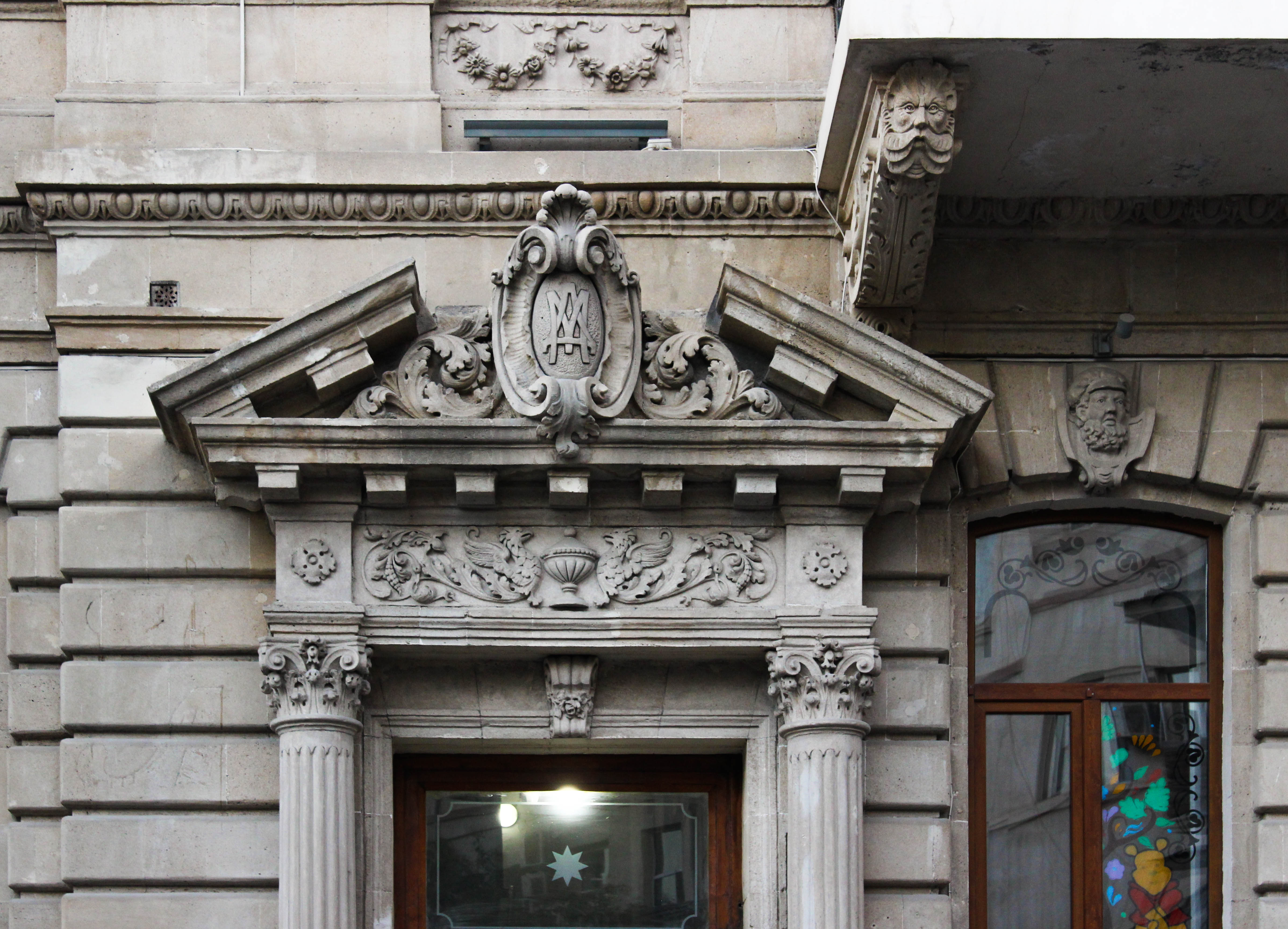

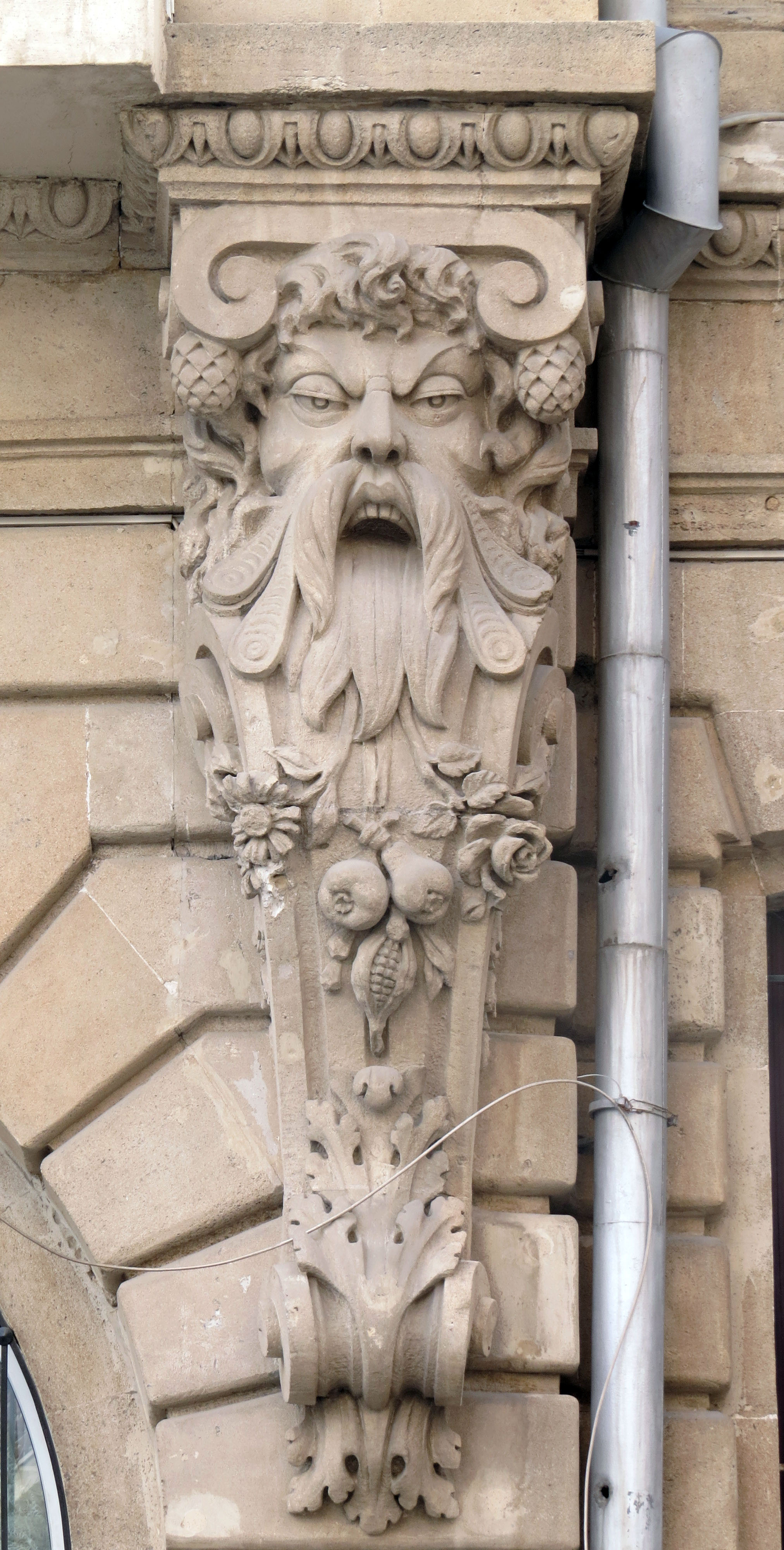

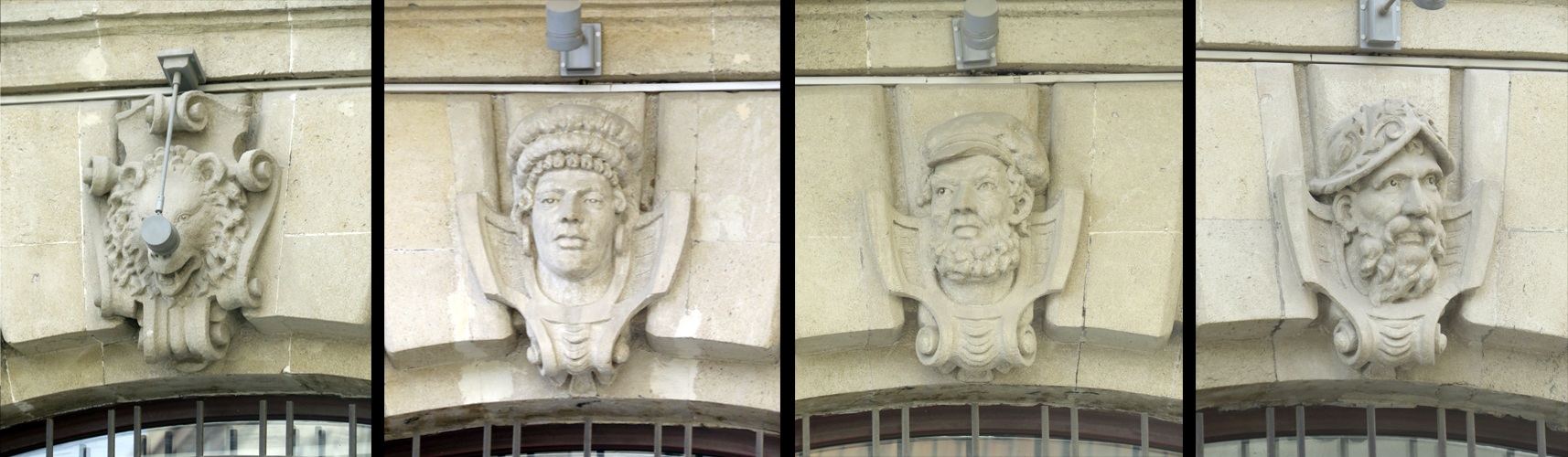

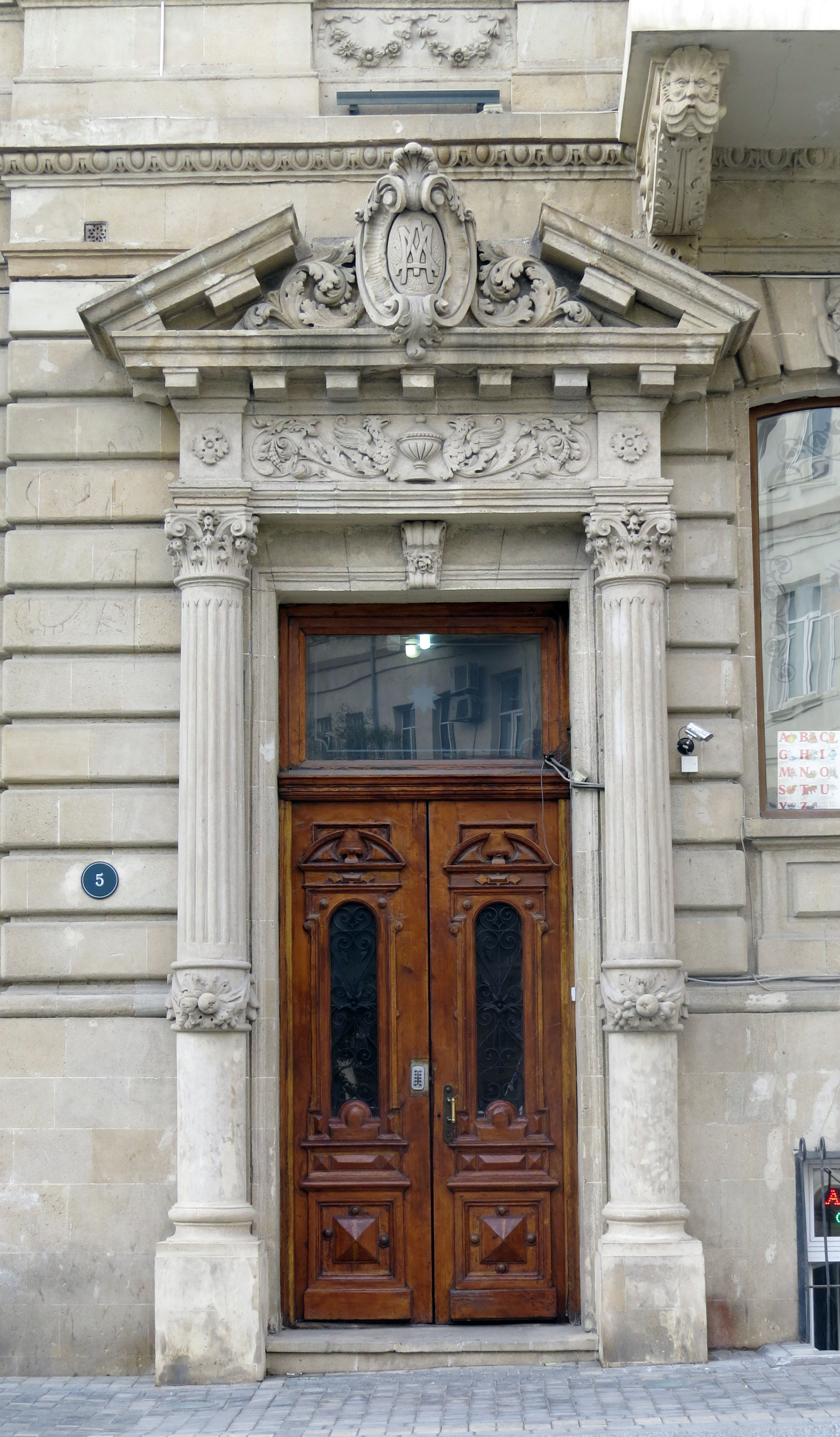

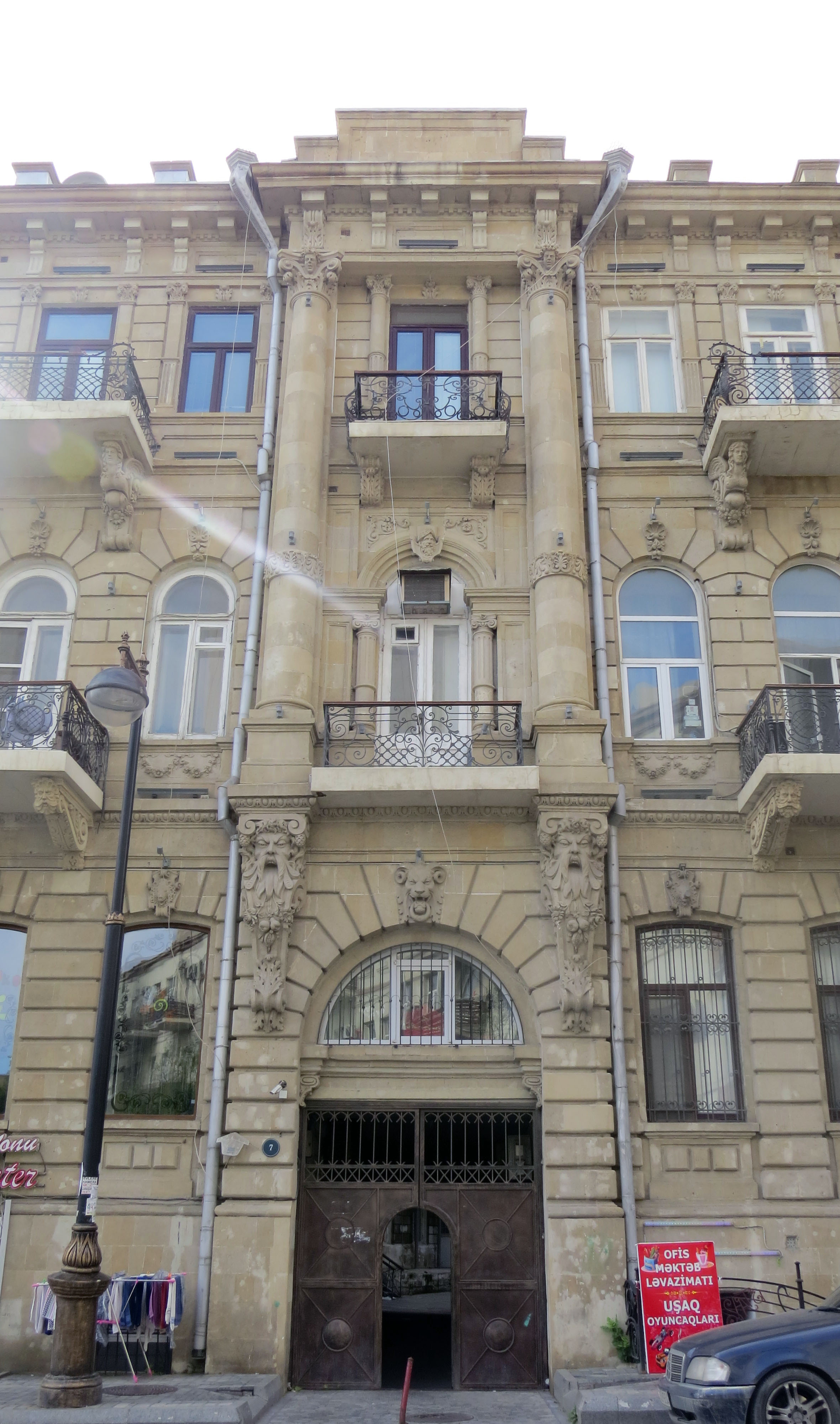

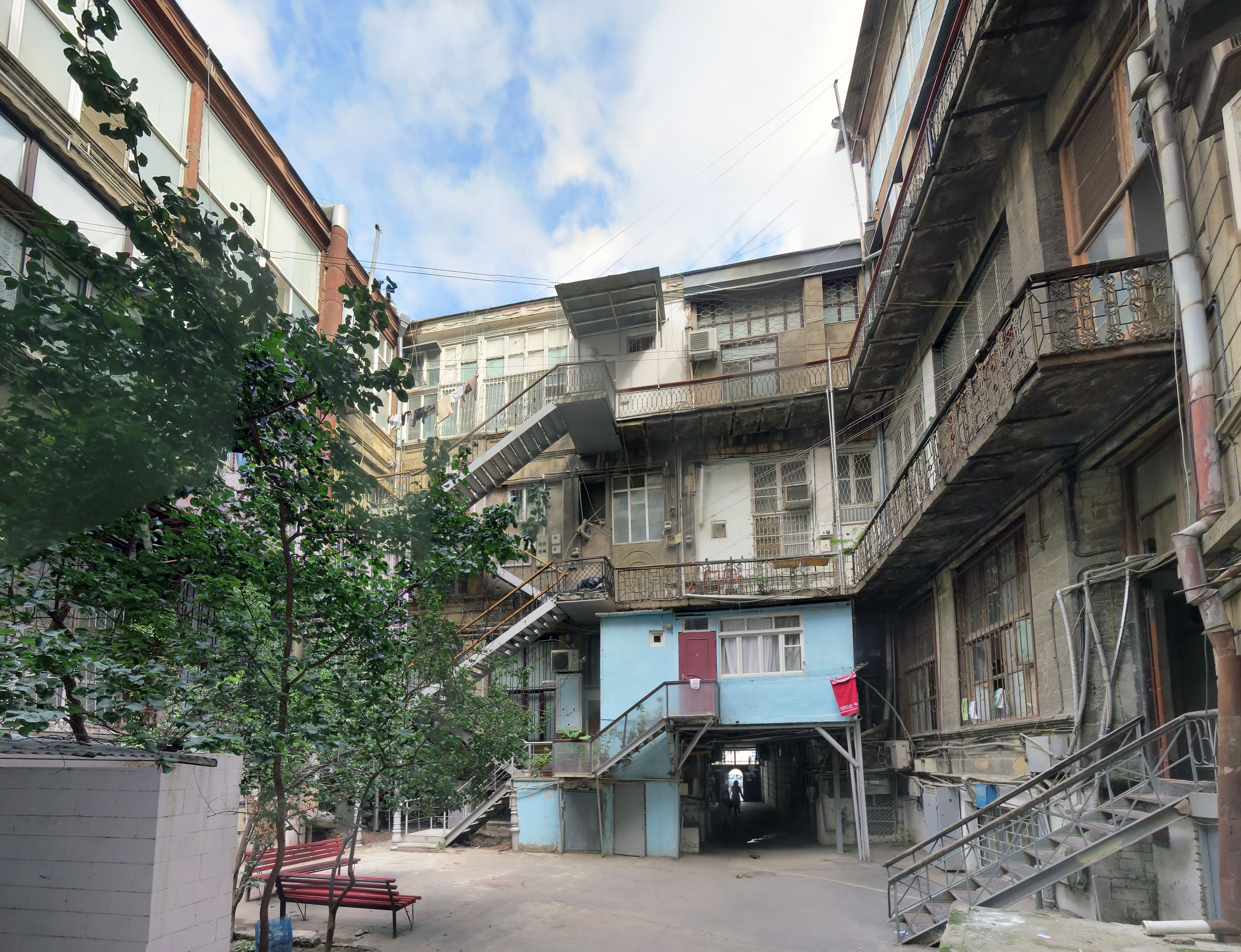

== See also ==
- Alibeyovs’ House
- House with Griffins
- Isa bek Hajinski House
- Ismailiyya Palace
- Kerbalai Israfil Hajiyev’s Mansion
- Mitrofanov Residence
