= Property of Haji Mustafa Rasulov =

- Azerbaijani: Hacı Mustafa Rəsulovun mülkü
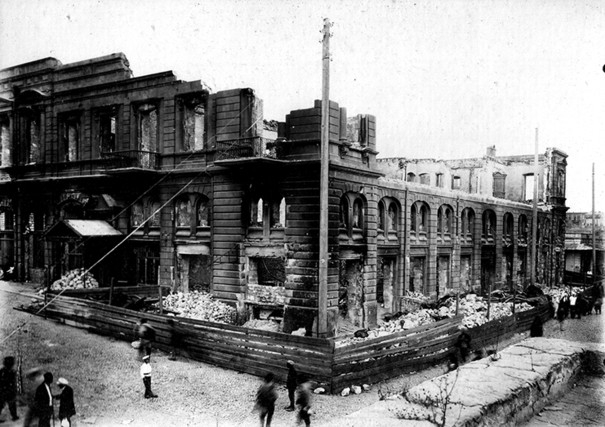
- Interactive map of the Property of Haji Mustafa Rasulov area

General information
- Location: Azerbaijan avenue, Yasamal, Baku, Azerbaijan
- Construction started: 1884
- Completed: 1885
- Owner: Haji Mustafa Rasulov

Design and construction
- Architects: Anton Kandinov; Nikanor Tverdokhlebov

Property of Haji Mustafa Rasulov (Azerbaijani: Hacı Mustafa Rəsulovun mülkü), is a building built by Anton Kandinov and Nikanor Tverdokhlebov in 1884–1885 by the order of Haji Mustafa Rasulov. Until 1918, the first floor of the building housed various shops and warehouses, and the second floor housed the Islamieh Hotel. During the March 1918 genocide, the building was set on fire by Armenians.

== About ==
According to the information provided by the landlord Haji Mustafa Rasulov to the Extraordinary Commission of Inquiry of the Azerbaijan Democratic Republic in 1918, there were 14 shops on the first floor of the property, 26 outside and 14 inside. Upstairs is a 60-room Islamieh hotel. The main façade is 70 steps along Gubernskaya Street, the side façade is 55 steps reaching to Bazarnaya Street, and the back façade of the house is 70 steps long to Staro-Postovaya Street.

The ground floor of the building was leased to the Rasulovs, and the Islamieh Hotel belonged to Ismayil Gulu oglu Mahmudov. According to 1918 estimates, the building cost more than 1 million rubles. The building was set on fire by Armenians in 1918 during the March genocide. At that time, only half-destroyed two-story walls and three-story walls with traces of flame and smoke on Bazarnaya Street remained.

After the renovation, in 1930, a pedestrian crossing was created on the first floor of the building along Bazarnaya Street. Music School No. 6. is located on the second floor.

Currently, there are different shops on the first floor of the building, and a hotel on the second floor.

== See also ==
- Ismailiyya Palace
- House with Griffins
- Isa bek Hajinski House
