= Lutfali bey Behbudov =

Azerbaijani engineer and politician (1877–1918)

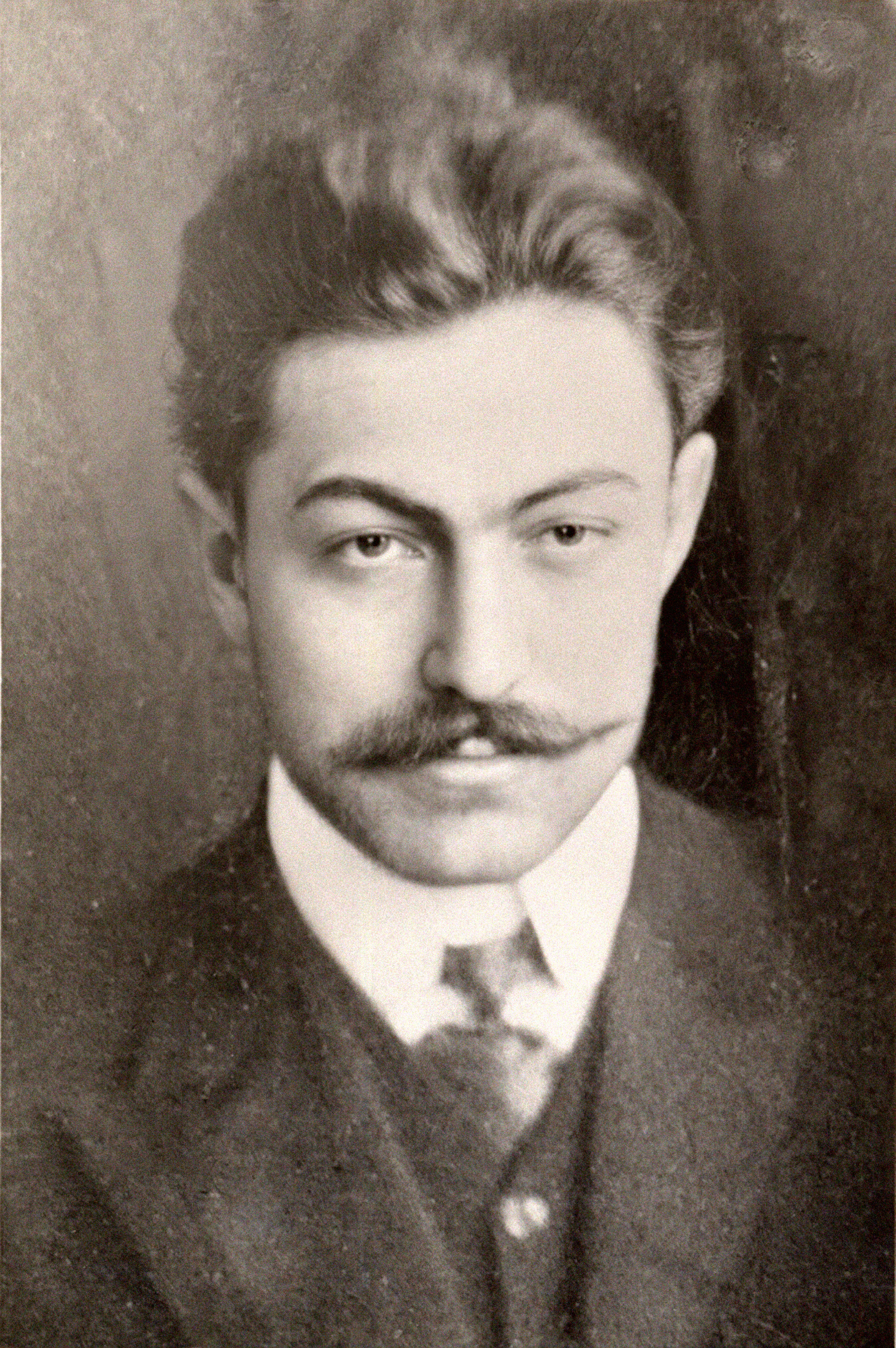
- Born: March 27, 1879; Uchoghlan, Shusha uezd
- Died: September–October 1918 (aged 38–39); Kyatuk or Gülablı, Azerbaijan Democratic Republic
- Education: St. Petersburg Technological Institute

Lutfali bey Behbudov (also erroneously Lyuftali or Niftali, Azerbaijani: Lütfəli bəy Behbudov, Russian: Лютфали-бек-Бебутов; March 27, 1879 – September or October 1918) was an Azerbaijani engineer, later member of Transcaucasian Seim and Azerbaijani National Council.

== Background ==
He was born in Uchoghlan or Bayat village, Shusha uezd, in 1879 to collegiate assessor Rahim bey Behbudov and Boyukhanim khanim. He was the second son of a large family. He had an elder brother Ali (1872–1937) and a younger brother Mirzali (1882–1937). The family was a part of Javanshir clan, descended from Behbud agha Javanshir, a brother of Panah Ali Khan, and hence inherited a high status in Karabakh. His sister Surayya was married to a son of Khurshidbanu Natavan, Mir Jafar.

== Biography ==
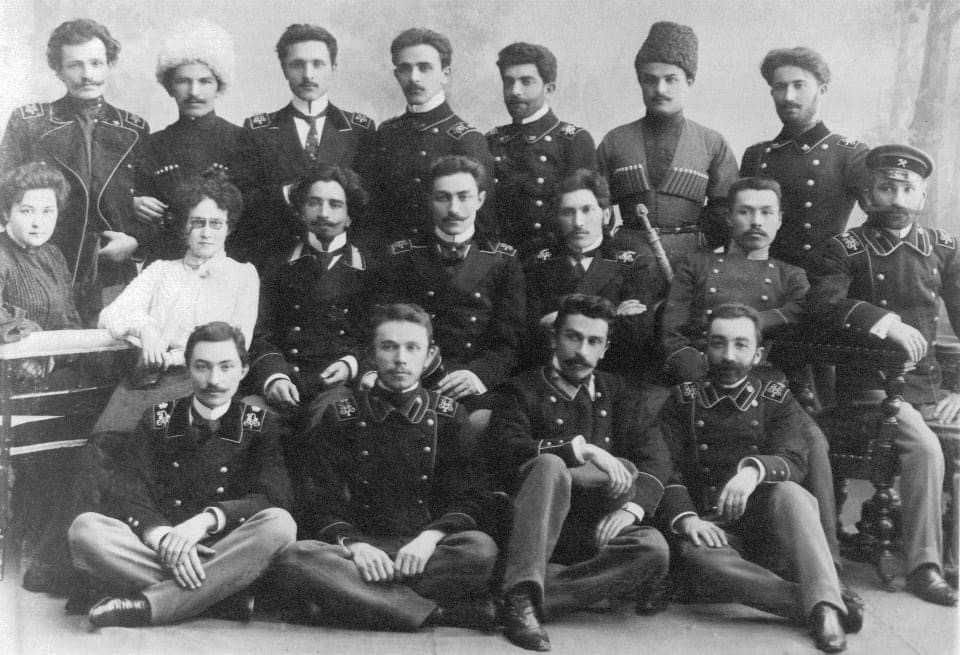
Lutfali bey among Muslim students in Saint Petersburg, 4th person from left in the middle, 1898

He attended St. Petersburg Technological Institute to be an engineer with a scholarship from Haji Zeynalabdin Taghiyev on the suggestion of Alimardan bey Topchubashov. Due to his participation in mass student riots, he was expelled from the institute, but later reinstated, finally graduating in 1904. After returning to Caucasus, he first started working at the Baku customs department, and also taught theoretical mechanics at the ship mechanics course for Caucasus and Mercury. He became a collegiate assessor like his father and was awarded the Order of St. Stanislaus of the 3rd class in 1908.

Behbudov later managed a considerable part of Taghiyev's business empire, including factories and private properties, as well as heading Taghiyev's Kura-Caspian Shipping Company since 1908, which would later be acquired by Caucasus and Mercury.

=== Dispute with Taghiyev ===
In 1911, a dispute arose between Taghiyev and Behbudov, leading to a physical altercation and a highly publicized trial. After meeting with Governor-General of the Caucasus Viceroyalty Vorontsov-Dashkov in Tbilisi and discussing Taghiyev's part in Transcaucasian Railway in May 7–15, he was accused by Taghiyev who suspected him of making advances towards his wife Sona Arablinskaya, daughter of general Balakishi Arablinski. Behbudov was beaten and tortured in Taghiyev's house which became a scandal in Baku. The incident involved Taghiyev's nephew, Taghiyev's son Sadiq (1868–1943), Iranian prince lieutenant-colonel Mansur Mirza Qajar and others. His situation was examined by Khosrov bey Sultanov and Bayram bey Akhundov. Following a trial in 1912, Taghiyev was sentenced to 2.5 years in prison, which was later acquitted in 1913 verdict in Tiflis.

Taghiyev was defended by Vasily Maklakov at the time. The incident was criticized by influential people of the time, including Vladimir Lenin who criticised Maklakov of "gobbling up Taghiyev fees", oil baron Murtuza Mukhtarov, journalist Rahim bey Melikov (nephew of Hasan bey Zardabi). Behbudov's kinsmen and fellow engineer Behbud Khan Javanshir even claimed that it was a regional dispute between Bakuvians and Karabakh Azerbaijanis. Fatali Khan Khoyski, who appeared as witness of the court, testified that he had not suggested to Behbudov to go to court. Taghiyev had his supporters as well, including writer Abdulkhalig Akhundov, Gara bey Garabeyov and others. Uzeyir Hajibeyov, writing for Molla Nasraddin magazine, accused contemporary journalists of muddying the waters.

== Later life ==
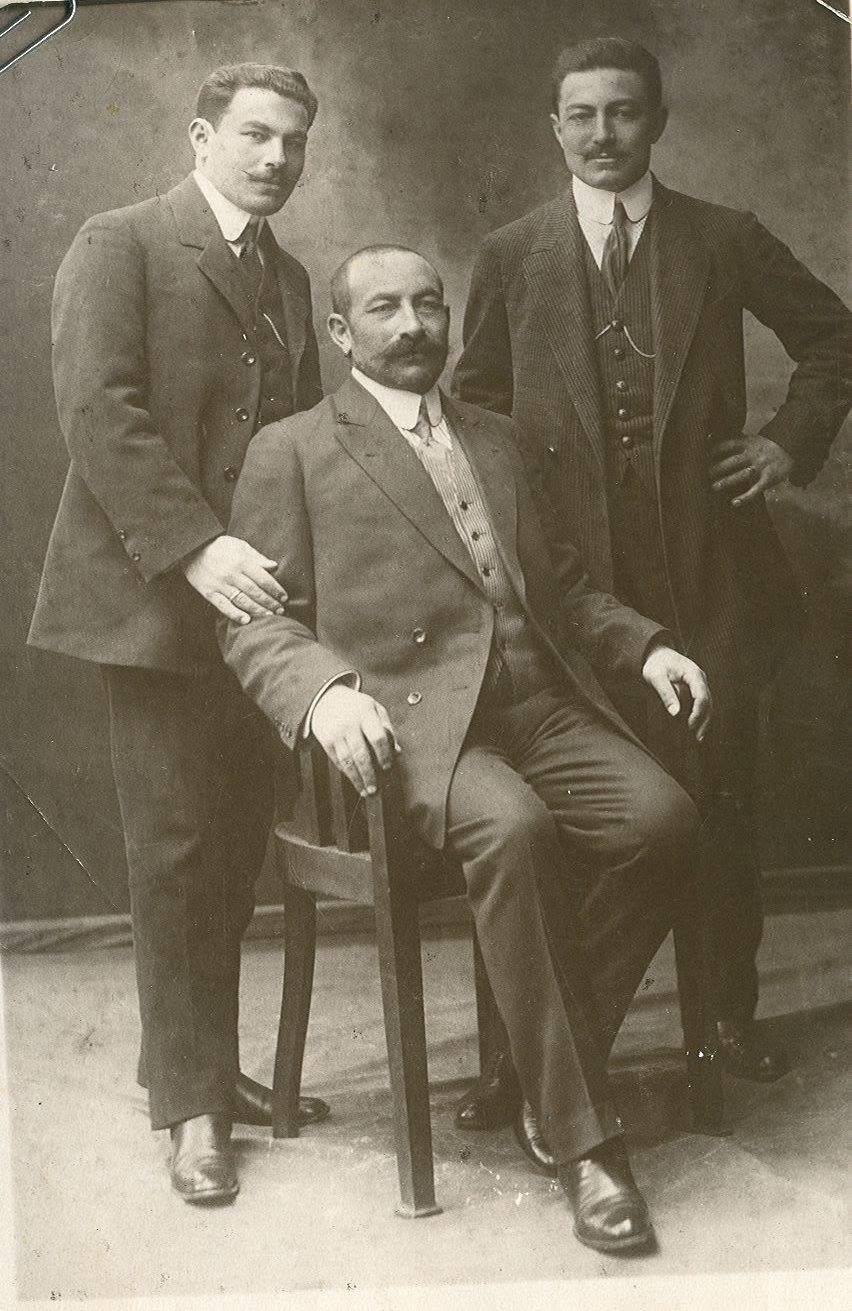
Lutfali bey (right) with his brothers Mirzali bey and Ali bey

He established "Kuratan" joint-stock company in 1911 with his brother to start his Kura river shipping business. Behbudov received the Order of St. Anna 3rd class on 15 March 1912, being promoted to court councillor on 28 May later. He went to work as an engineer in Arkhangelsk port on 1 October 1912, returning to Caucasus a year later to work in Yelizavetpol. According to the memoirs of Harutyun Tumian, he was minister of post and telegraphic communications of the Transcaucasian Commissariat. Later he also became a member of the Transcaucasian Seim. He was elected as deputy of the Armenian-Turkish Committee of Shusha alongside Dashnaksutyun representative Hayrapet Musaelyan as well as President of the Karabakh Sovereign Committee as part of Transcaucasian Commissariat. According to Tumian:

At the beginning of April, engineer Lutfali bey Behbudov, the former minister of post and telegraphic communications of the Transcaucasian commissariat, came to Shusha. He had brought with him 500,000 rubles from Tiflis, of which 200,000 were for the country's food needs, and 200,000 were for fighting against anarchy. The 300,000 rubles allocated for food had a very insignificant value in the sea of insufficient needs. That money was contributed to the general treasury of the city, which still maintained its existence in a name. Citizens in need, regardless of Armenians or Turks, were given 50 rubles each, which could barely buy a few pounds of bread. The commissariat was instructed to use the 200,000 rubles to get acquainted with the general condition of the population of field and mountain Karabakh, fight against anarchy and solve several local problems. That work was to be done by Lutfali bey as a representative of Muslims and Musayelyan by Armenians. The questions were first examined in the Inter-Party Bureau and the Muslim National Committee, after which they were transferred to the International Committee. Behbudov also participated in the examination of issues here as a representative of the commissariat.

Lutfali bey quickly gained the respect of both the Armenian and Azerbaijani populations of Shusha and tried to maintain peace between the two communities. In May 1918, he became a member of the Azerbaijani National Council. He tried to mediate between Karabakh Council and Khosrov bey Sultanov, his old acquaintance. He did the same later for Hasan Basri bey, Nuri Pasha's commander in Karabakh. He was the first person to report the result of the Battle of Baku to the Armenian population of Shusha. Musaelyan and Behbudov met Cemil Cahit Toydemir, Nuri Pasha's new commander in Karabakh, in Aghdam on 18 September.

According to Tumian, Lutfali bey was murdered on the orders of Toydemir after this meeting. However, according to Hamida Javanshir's memoirs, he was killed near Gülablı, while observing the frontline, while Armenian sources allege Kyatuk to be Behbudov's death place. The Azerbaijani Parliament remembered Behbudov's death with 1 minute's silence on 16 November 1918.

== Family ==
He was married to a Tatar noblewoman named Leyli and fathered three daughters with her - Dilara, Pari and Leyla.
