= Hotel Marriott =

Hotel Marriott may refer to hotels owned by Marriott International including:

- Tbilisi Marriott Hotel
- Centrum LIM, Warsaw Marriott Hotel
