= Mikayel Varandian =

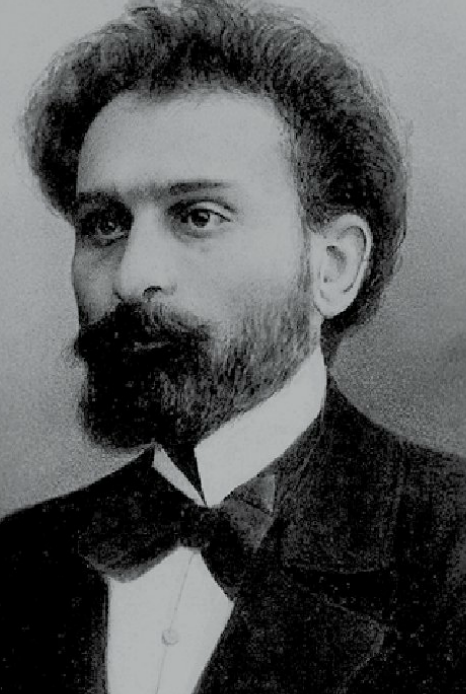
Mikayel Varandian

Mikayel Varandian (Armenian: Միքայէլ Վարանդեան, (Note: Reformed orthography: Միքայել Վարանդյան) born Mikayel Hovhannisian; 1870 – 22 April 1934) was an Armenian revolutionary, historian, and diplomat. He was the main theoretician of the Armenian Revolutionary Federation (ARF).

== Biography ==
Varandian was born Mikayel Hovhannisian in the village of Kyatuk in the Varanda canton of the region of Karabakh. He took the pen-name Varandian in honor of his home province. He received his secondary education in Shushi. He studied at Geneva University, where he met ARF founders Kristapor Mikaelian and Rostom. From 1892 he was a member of the editorial board of Droshak, the ARF's official organ, which published a large number of his articles and editorials. After 1904, he was a member of the ARF's Western Bureau, one of the party's top decision-making bodies. From 1907 he was the ARF's representative at the Second International. He also served as the editor of the ARF newspaper Horizon published in Tbilisi. When the First Republic of Armenia was established in 1918, Varandian was nominated to serve as the republic's ambassador to Italy.

He authored The History of the ARF (two volumes) and many other books. He died in Marseille on 22 April 1934.

== Works ==
- Վերածնւող հայրենիքը եւ մեր դերը : (Դաշնակցութեան 20-ամեակի առիթով) [The reborn homeland and our role: (On the occasion of the 20th anniversary of Dashnaktsutiun)]. Geneva: ARF Press, 1910.
- Բողոքը նորագոյն պատմութեան մէջ [Protest in recent history]. Geneva: ARF Press, 1914.
- Սիմոն Զաւարեան․ Գծեր իր Կեանքէն [Simon Zavarean: Sketches from his life]. Boston: Hayrenik', 1927.
- Հ․ Յ․ Դաշնակցութեան պատմութիւն [History of A. R. Federation]. Paris: Navarre, 1932 (volume 1), 1950 (volume 2).

== Sources ==
- Khudinyan, G. (1996). "Varandyan Mikʻayel" Վարանդյան Միքայել. In Khudaverdyan, Kostandin; et al. (eds.). Haykakan hartsʻ hanragitaran Հայկական հարց հանրագիտարան [Encyclopedia of the Armenian question] (in Armenian). Yerevan: Haykakan hanragitarani glkhavor khmbagrutʻyun. p. 432.
- Mikael Varantian: Profile of a National Hero
- Mikael Varantian: storia di un eroe e primo ambasciatore in Italia, in Centro Studi "Hrand Nazariantz", 6 July 2018 (in Italian).
