= Gabriel Ter-Mikelov =

Soviet Armenian architect

- Գաբրիել Տեր-Միքաելյան
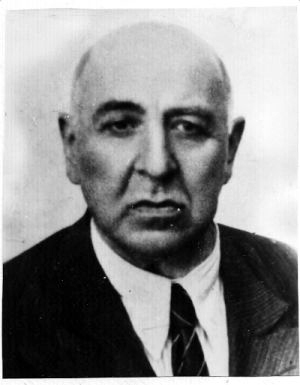
- Gavril Mikhaylovich Ter-Mikelov (Gavriil Ter-Mikaelian)
- Born: 16 April 1874; Stavropol, Russia
- Died: 14 January 1949 (aged 74); Tbilisi, USSR
- Resting place: Vera cemetery
- Education: St. Petersburg Institute of Civil Engineering
- Occupations: Architect, professor
- Awards: Honored Artist of the Georgian SSR
- Buildings: Saint Thaddeus and Bartholomew Cathedral; Hotel Majestic
- Design: Baku Public Club Building

Gabriel Mikhaylovich Ter-Mikelov (Armenian: Գափրիել Տեր-Միքաելյան Gabriel Ter-Mikelyan; 16 April 1874 in Stavropol, Russia – 14 January 1949 in Tbilisi, USSR) was a prominent architect of Armenian descent.

== Life ==
According to Gabriel Ter-Mikelov's sister Suzanna Zohrabyan, the family's origins trace back to Karabakh and their original last name was Aslanbekyan. The family eventually settled in Tbilisi. During the occupation of Tbilisi by Mohammad Khan Qajar in 1795, the city was reduced to ashes and its Christian population were massacred. Almost all members of the Aslanbekyan family were murdered except for a two-year child who was saved by an Armenian priest Ter Mikayel. This child, who was the grandfather of Gavriil Ter-Mikelov, took up the Ter-Mikayelian last name and was later known as Ter-Mikelov due to Russification policies of Czarist Russia. His parents were both born in Tbilisi. Ter-Mikelov's father worked in many state run institutions and due to his knowledge of many languages, he was often sent on foreign trips. Ter-Mikelov's mother was an educated woman who graduated the Tbilisi High School of Young Ladies with Golden Cross Honors and eventually became a teacher herself. Gavriil Ter-Mikelov was born in Stavropol on 16 April 1874. He studied in the Tbilisi Realschule and went to St. Petersburg where in 1893 he entered the St. Petersburg Institute of Civil Engineering and graduated from it in 1899. He moved to Baku where he lived and worked till 1912. After moving to Tbilisi, he became a lecturer at the Tbilisi Academy of Fine Arts, Honored Artist of the Georgian SSR, and member of the Academy of Architecture of the USSR. Ter-Mikelov died on 14 January 1949 at the age of 74 and was buried in the Armenian Vera Cemetery in Tbilisi. Gavriil Ter-Mikelov's architectural career lasted for over 50 years. Throughout his career, Ter-Mikelov had drafted 70 projects, 37 of which were completed.

== Works ==
=== Baku ===
Gabriel Ter-Mikelov designed Baku Public Club Building (today Azerbaijan State Philharmonic Hall), the maternity hospital (1899), the building of the Baku branch of the Tiflis Trade Bank (1902-1903; today “Children's World” department store), the Adamoff Brothers residence, the Sadikhov Residence (1910-1912; Nikolayevskaya street 1; USSR number 21), Physiotherapy Institute, Four-storey Apartment ordered by Taghiyev (Nizami 30, crossroads with Mariinskaya Street), and the Commercial College (1905-1913; Merkurevskaya Street 39). He was also one of the main architects of the Saint Thaddeus and Bartholomew Armenian Cathedral.

=== Tbilisi ===
Under the suggestion of famed Armenian entrepreneur Mikayel Aramyants, Gabriel Ter-Mikelov designed and built many buildings in the Georgian capital such Hotel Majestic (1915; Today Tbilisi Marriott Hotel), residence of the Armenian merchant Melik Dadayan (1915), living house of Milov (1914), and the National Musical Center of Georgia (originally a building for railway workers). Gabriel Ter-Mikelov was an honored Artist of the Republic of Georgia, corresponding member of the all-Union Academy of architecture, professor at the Tbilisi Academy of Arts. He taught at the Academy until 1949.

=== Yalta ===
A church complex was commissioned by oil-magnate P. Ter-Ghukasyan, who wanted to build a church in memory of his daughter, who died in Yalta, Russia. Subsequently, he purchased land area in Yalta for the church to be built. The church was built on a hill with 128 step stairs rising from 2 propylene-chapel shapes.

== Gallery ==
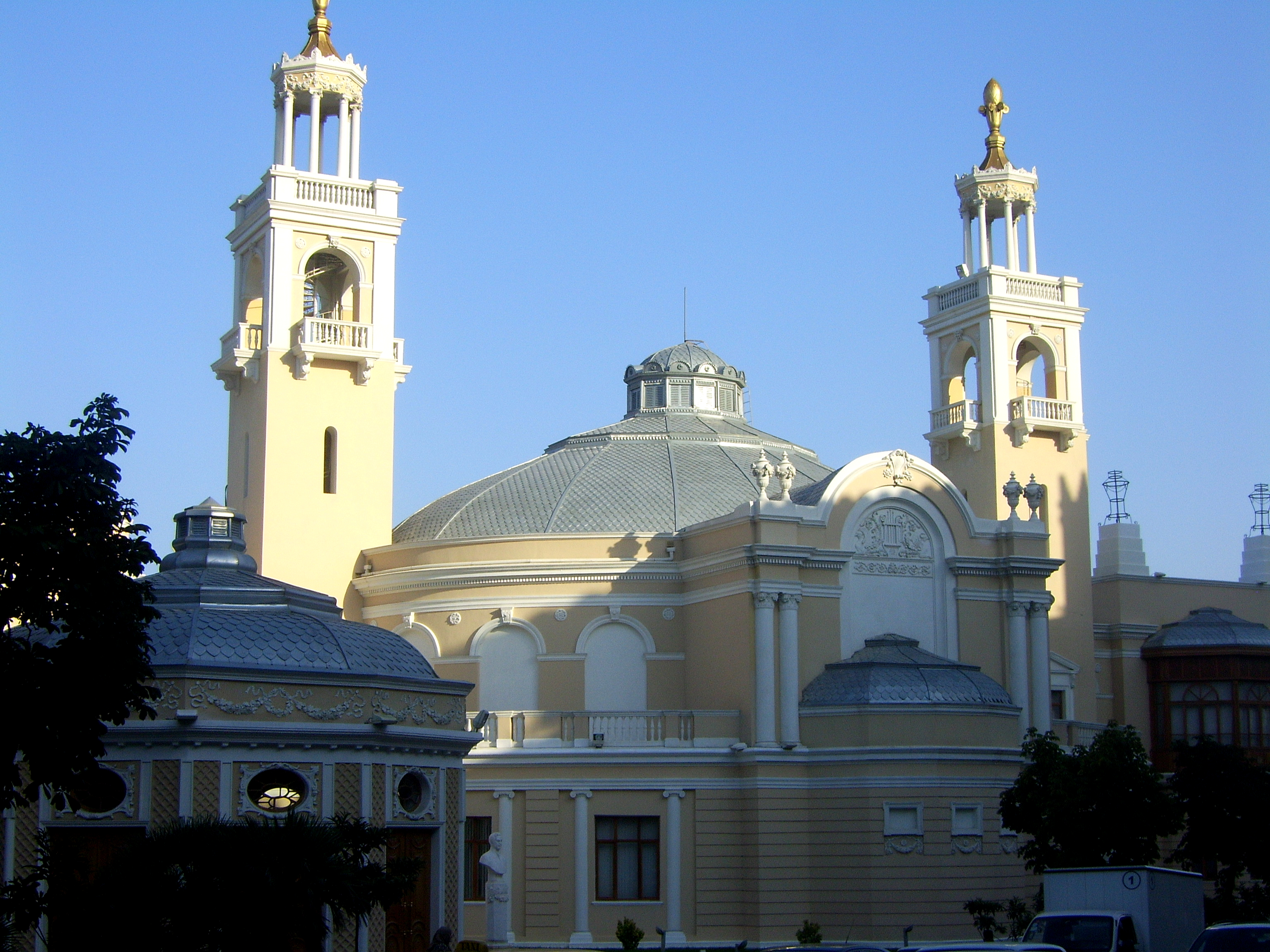
Azerbaijan State Philharmonic Hall designed by Gavriil Ter-Mikelov.

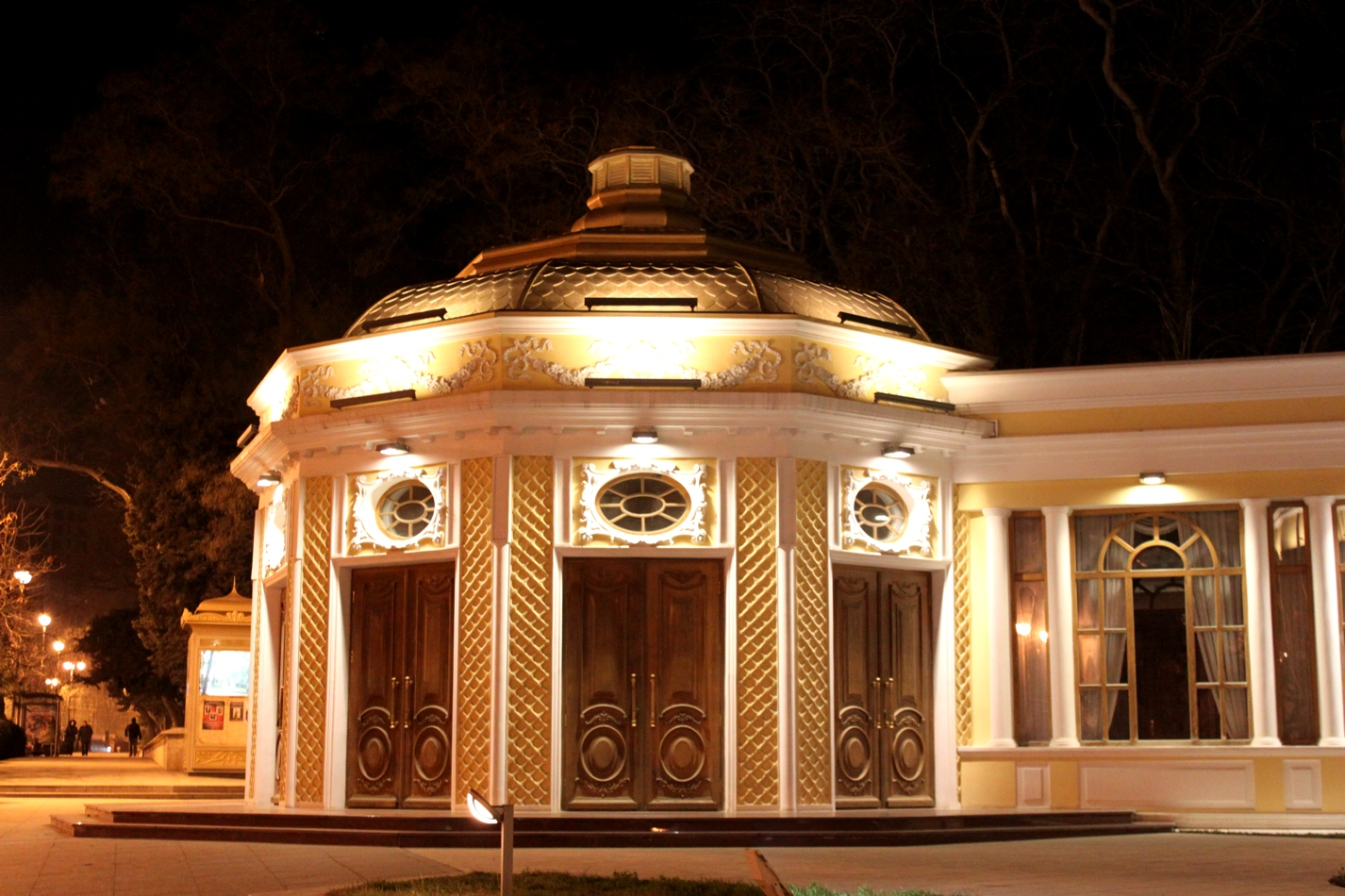
Azerbaijan State Philharmonic Hall designed by Gavriil Ter-Mikelov.

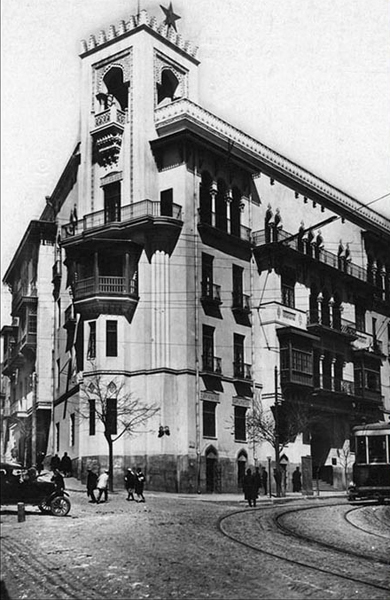
Sadikhov Residence in Baku (1910-1912)

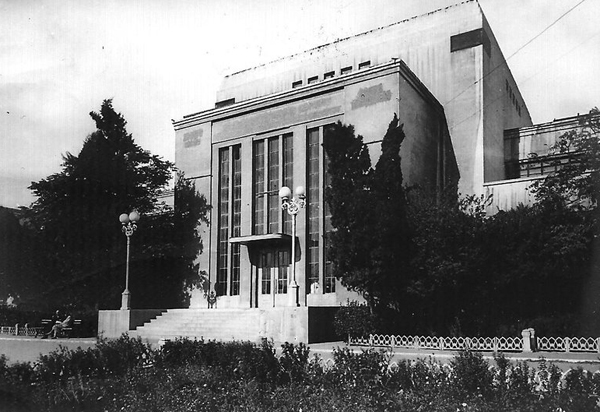
Physiotherapy Institute of Baku (1929)

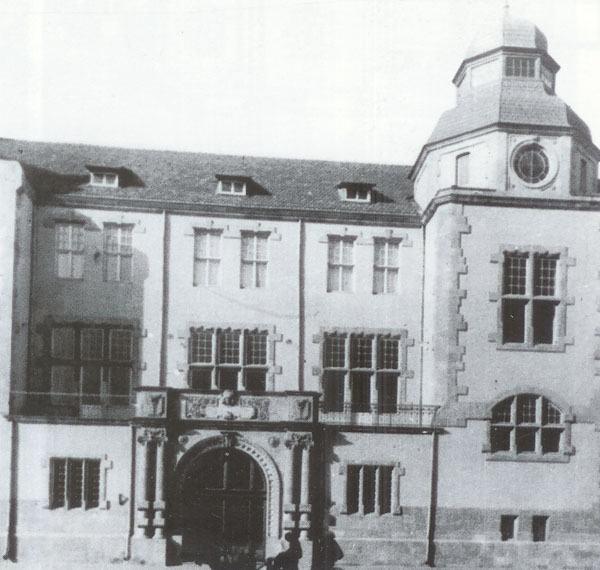
Commercial College of Baku (1913)

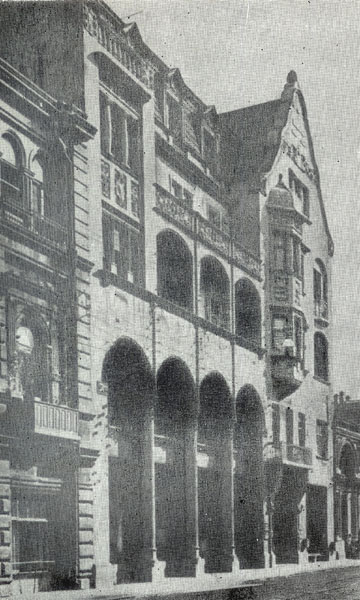
The dwelling house of Adamyan brothers in Baratinskaya street (1908)

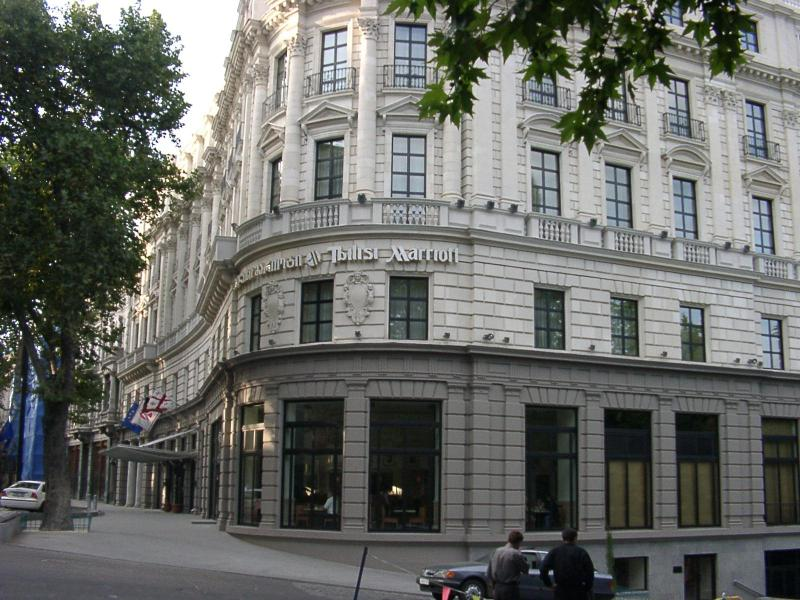
Tbilisi Marriott Hotel designed by Gavriil Ter-Mikelov.

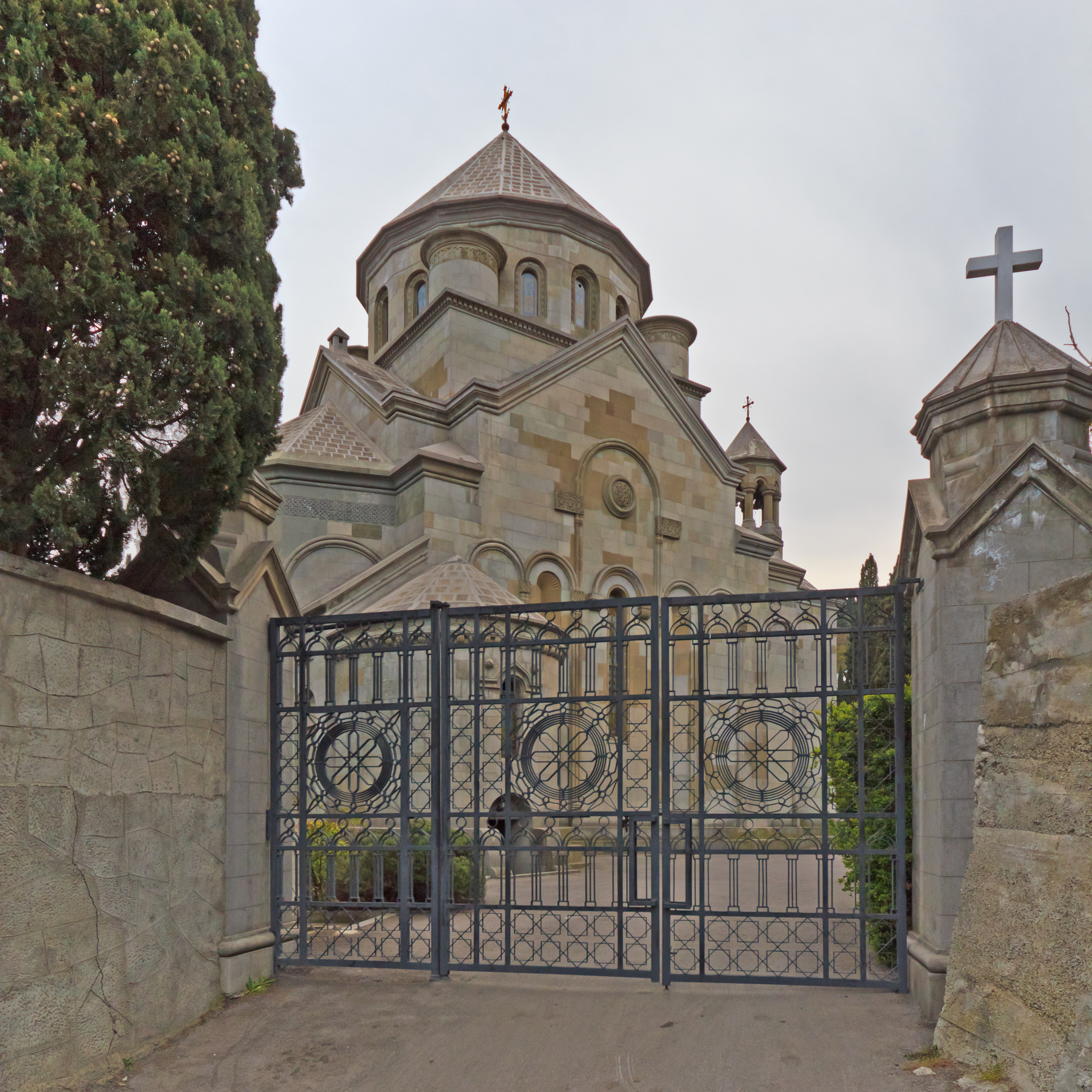
Yalta Armenian Church designed by Gavriil Ter-Mikelov.

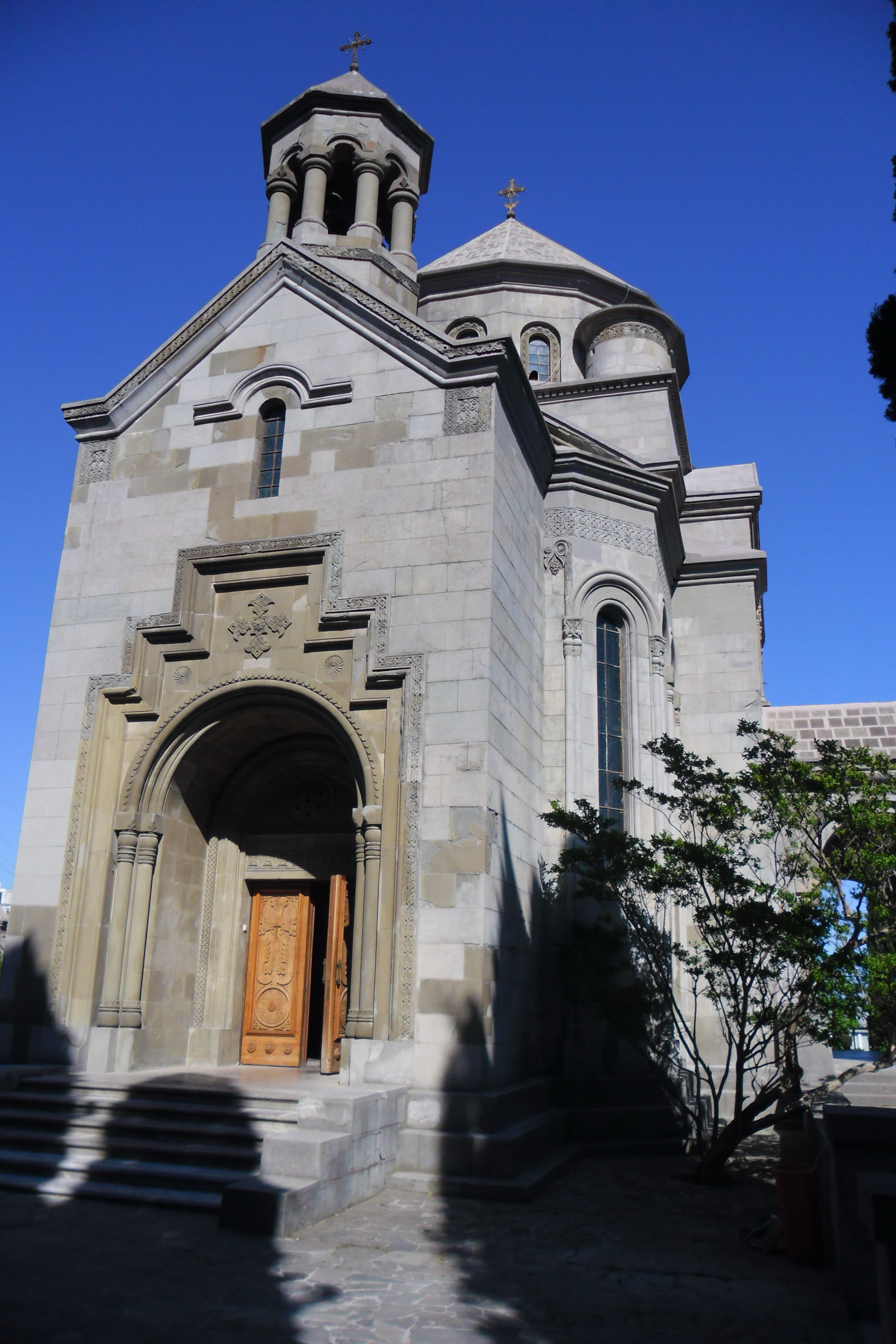
Yalta Armenian Church.

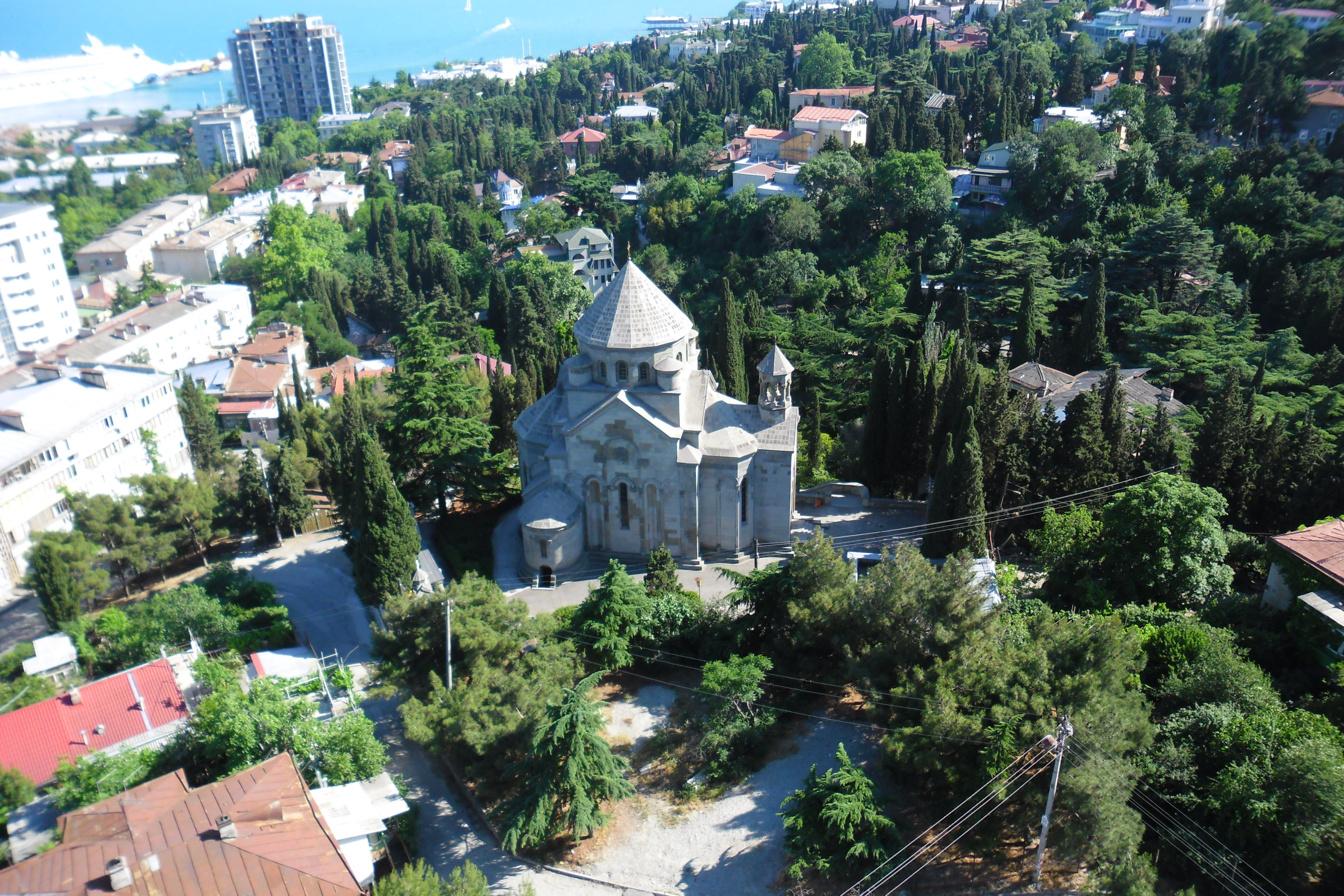
Aerial view of Yalta Church.

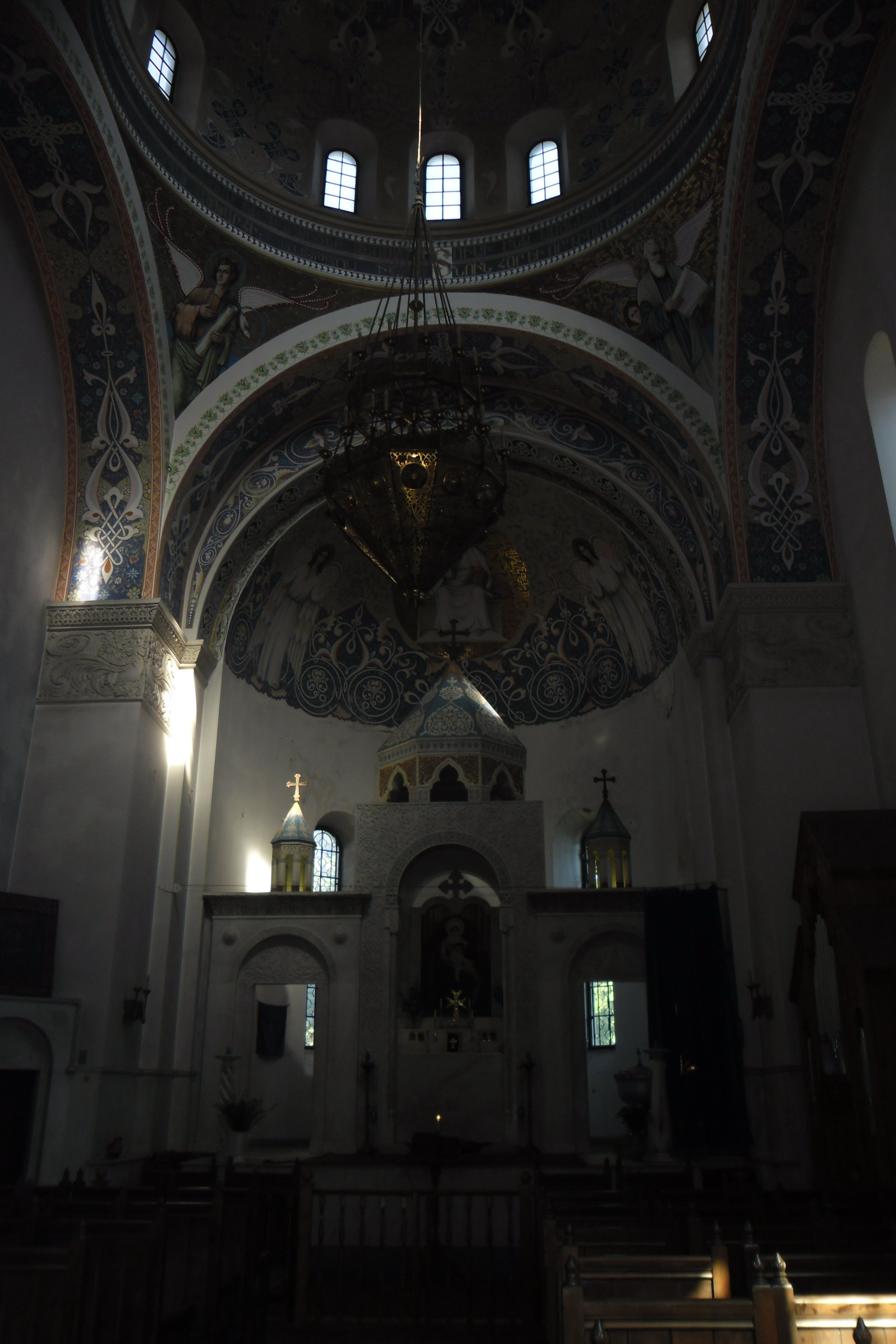
Inside of Yalta Church.
