= Mikael Aramyants =

Armenian oil magnate, industrialist, financier and philanthropist

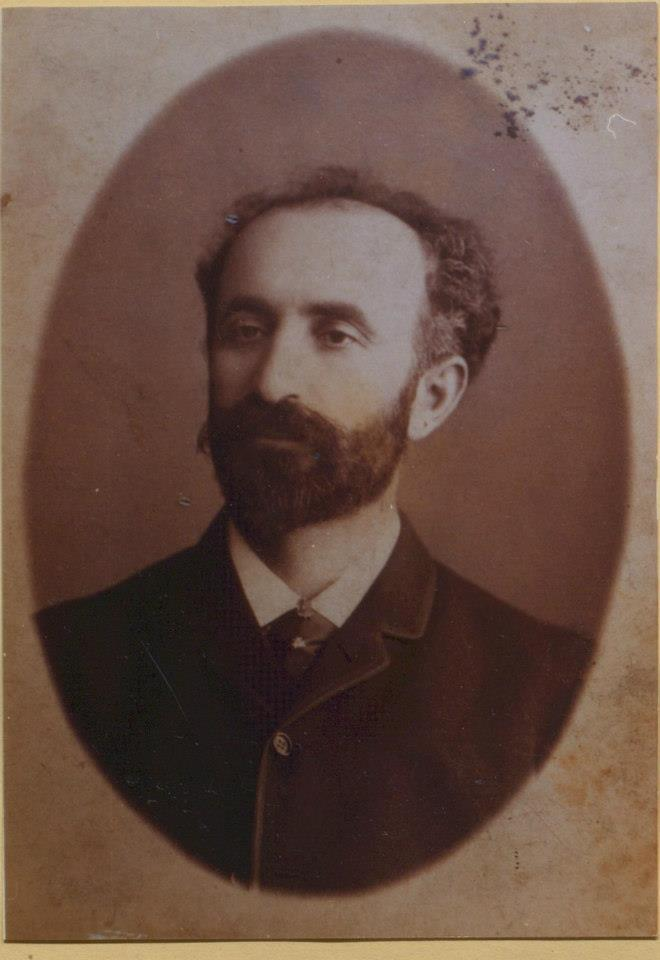
- Born: 4 May 1843
- Died: 1922; Tbilisi, Georgian SSR
- Occupations: Oil Magnate, industrialist, financier, and a philanthropist

Mikael Aramyants (Armenian: Միքայել Արամյանց, May 4, 1843, Kyatuk, Varanda, Artsakh – 1923, Tiflis) was an Armenian oil magnate, industrialist, financier, and a philanthropist, and a founder and board member of the Tiflis National Charitable Society. He operated in the Russian Empire.

He was a close friend of Alexander Mantashyants and his charitable contributions rivaled those of fellow oil magnate.

== Biography ==
Mikael Aramyants was born on 4 May 1843 in Karabakh. Thereafter, he moved to Tbilisi contributed to the development of trade, health, education and culture. Mikael Aramyants was permanent sponsor of the Armenian Nersisian School in Tiflis (now Tbilisi). He was a successful sugar and cotton businessman, owner of professional, profitable houses, estates, lands, cottages and resorts, and especially of Akhtala and Kislovodsk health resorts owner and director. In Tbilisi, Aramyants founded the Aramiants Hospital, now Clinical Hospital No. 1, though it is still called the Aramiants hospital by old people living in Tbilisi. He equipped ‘Aramiants hospital’ with the newest and best medical apparatus of the time. He was instrumental in bringing the first X-ray to Tbilisi from Europe in order to help to diagnose people and cure them. As contemporaneous observers suggest, this was a large hospital complex built according to European standards. First were constructed an infectious, surgery, and maternity hospitals. Mikael Aramyants had a big role in the development of the oil industry in the Caucasus. He moved the majority of his capital to construct an oil road from Baku to Batumi. Aramyants helped to build shelters for homeless refugees of Western Armenia. The settlement later was known as "Aramashen 'settlement. The name of Mikael Aramyants is connected with Tbilisi Marriott Hotel which he built in the beginning of the 20th century and called it "Mazhestik" in memory of his beloved ship.

After the Bolsheviks came to rule the country Aramyants lost most of his wealth and died of hunger in the basement of his hotel. It was in Aramyants' apartment that the first Armenian Republic's decree was signed.

== See also ==
- Alexander Mantashev
- Armenians in Tbilisi
