= Kyatuk, Nagorno-Karabakh =

Village in Nagorno-Karabakh

Kyatuk / Aghgadik Քյաթուկ / Ağgədik
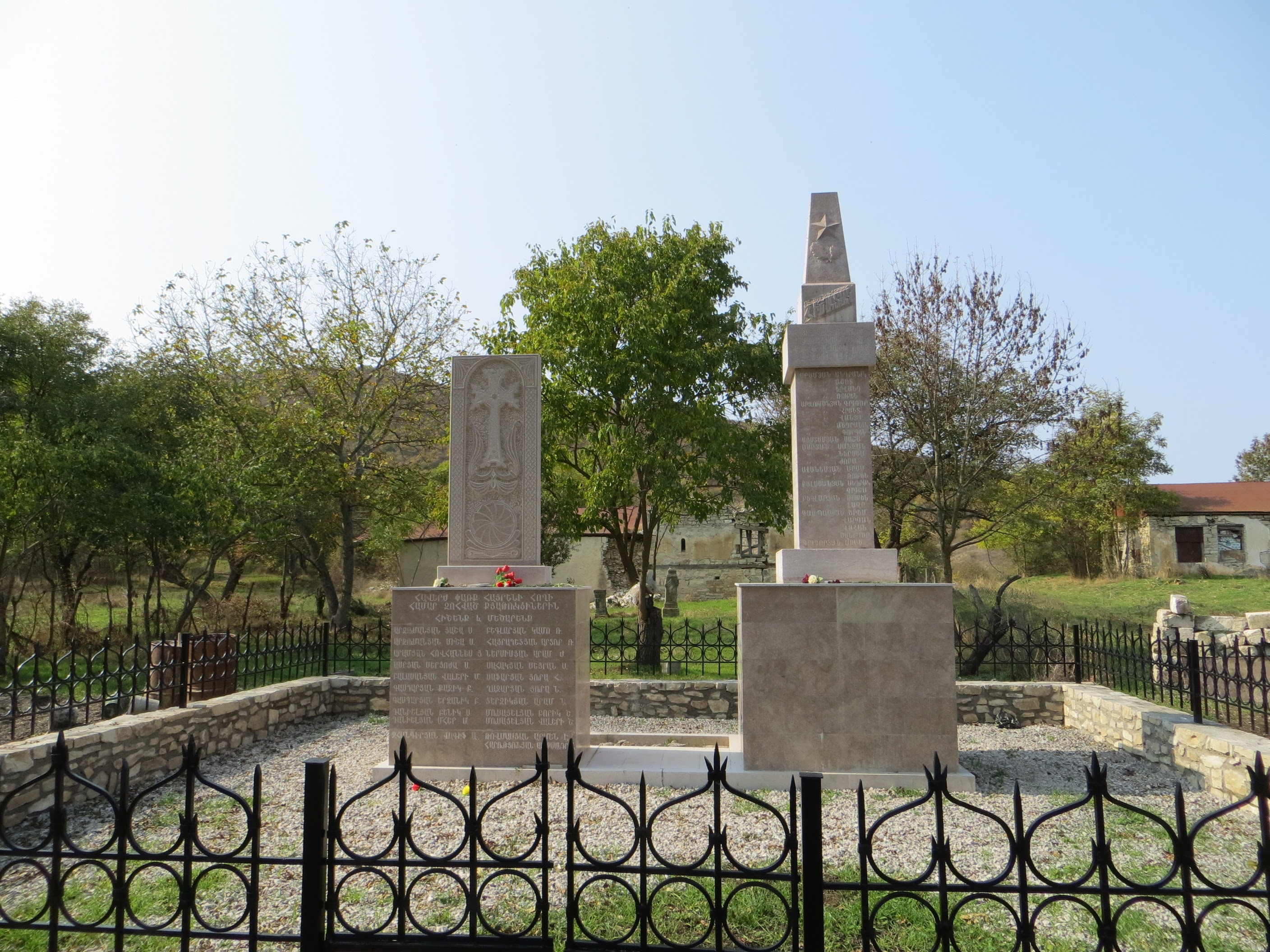
- Memorial in Kyatuk

- Location within Azerbaijan Location within Karabakh Economic Region
- Coordinates: 39°54′11″N 46°50′49″E
- Country: Azerbaijan
  - District: Khojaly
- Elevation: 985 m (3,232 ft)

Population (2015)
  - Total: 6
- Time zone: UTC+4 (AZT)

Kyatuk (Armenian: Քյաթուկ) or Aghgadik (Azerbaijani: Ağgədik) is a village in the Khojaly District of Azerbaijan, in the region of Nagorno-Karabakh. Until 2023 it was controlled by the breakaway Republic of Artsakh. The village had an ethnic Armenian-majority population until the expulsion of the Armenian population of Nagorno-Karabakh by Azerbaijan following the 2023 Azerbaijani offensive in Nagorno-Karabakh.

== History ==
During the Soviet period, the village was part of the Askeran District of the Nagorno-Karabakh Autonomous Oblast.

== Economy and culture ==
The village is part of the community of Askeran.

== Demographics ==
The village had 8 inhabitants in 2005, and 6 inhabitants in 2015.

== Notable people ==
- Mikael Aramyants (1843–1923) – Armenian oil magnate
- Mikayel Varandian (1870–1934) – Armenian revolutionary and historian

== Gallery ==
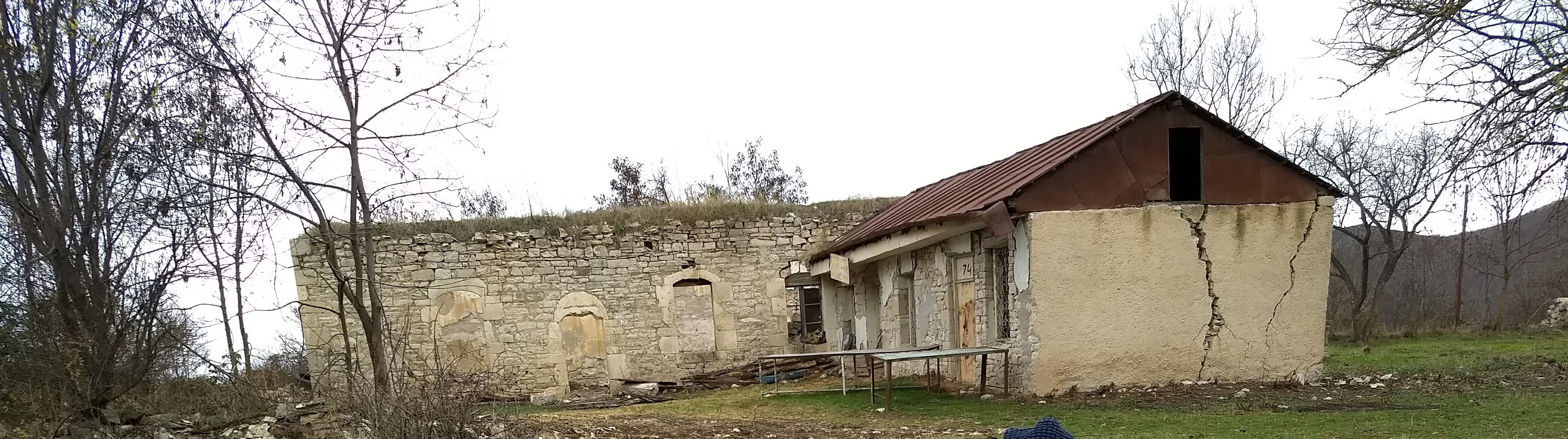
Semi-ruined Armenian Church of Kyatuk with attached store

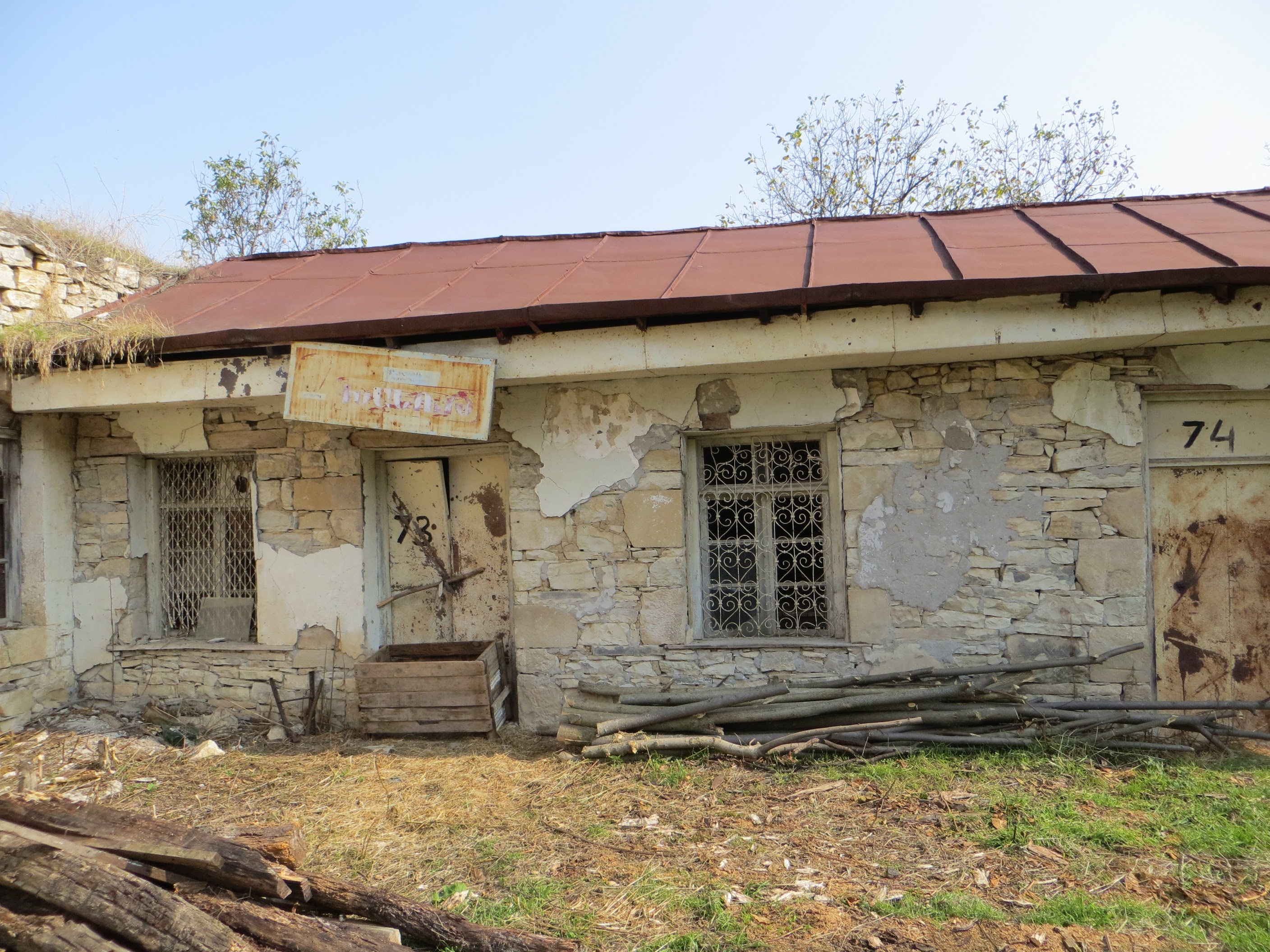
Ruined old Soviet store of Kyatuk
