= Zeynalabdin Taghiyev =

Azerbaijani philanthropist (died 1924)

Hajji Zeynalabdin Taghiyev
- Hacı Zaynalabdin Tağıyev
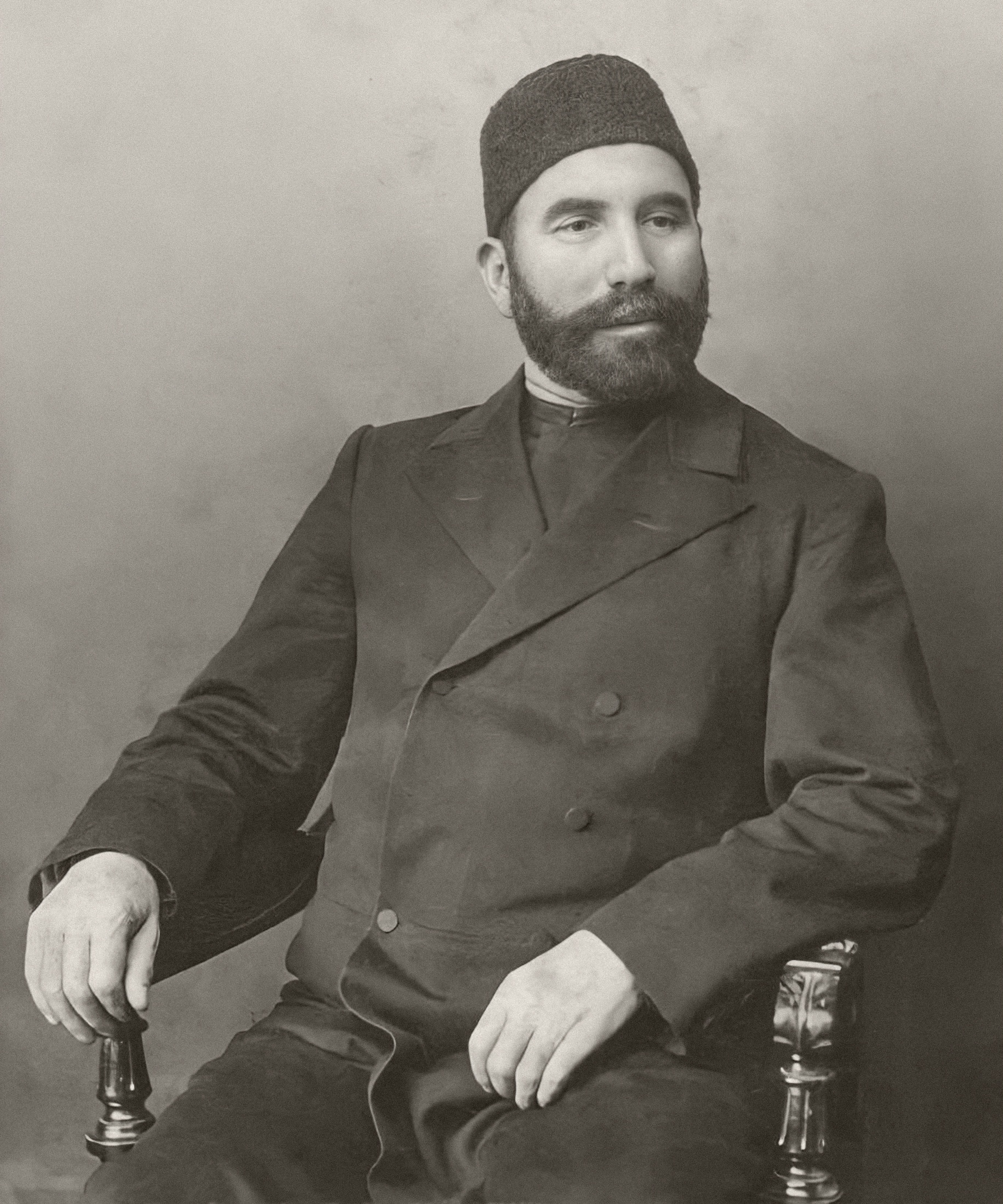
- Born: 25 January 1823 or 1821 or 1838; Baku, Russian Empire
- Died: 1 September 1924; Mardakan, Azerbaijan SSR, Transcaucasian SFSR, Soviet Union
- Spouse(s): Zeynab Taghiyeva (†?); Sona Taghiyeva
- Children: Ismayil Taghiyev, Sadig Taghiyev, Khanim Taghiyeva (by 1st marriage); Leyla Taghiyeva, Sara Taghiyeva, Mammad Taghiyev, Ilyas Taghiyev, Surayya Taghiyeva (by 2nd marriage)
- Parent(s): Muhammedtaghi Taghiyev; Umkhanum

Hajji Mirza Zeynalabdin Taghi oghlu Taghiyev (Azerbaijani: Mirzə Zeynalabdin Tağı oğlu Tağıyev; Russian: Тагиев, Гаджи Зейналабдин) (b. 25 January 1821, 1823, or 1838, d. 1 September 1924) was an Azerbaijani national industrial magnate and philanthropist.

== Early life ==
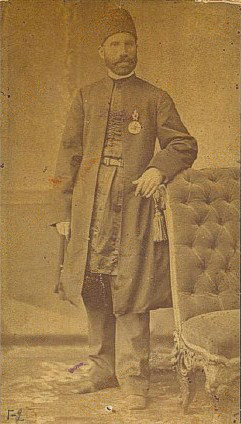
Zeynalabdin Taghiyev in the 1880s

Zeynalabdin Taghiyev was born into the poor family of a shoemaker Muhammedtaghi Taghiyev, and his wife Umukhanum, in the Old City of Baku. After his mother's death and his father's second marriage, he started learning masonry to help provide for his family of seven (sisters). His dedication to work ensured quick professional advancement and at 18, he was already a contractor. By mid-1873 along with two companions, Sarkis brothers, he purchased land near the oil-booming town of Bibi-Heybat, a few kilometres to the southeast of Baku. Although the intention was to discover oil, their attempts in that respect proved fruitless. After a while, Taghiyev's companions sold their share to him and returned to Baku. It was not long after that oil gushed forth from one of the wells in 1877, leading to Taghiyev instantly becoming one of the richest men in the Russian Empire.

== Contributions to economy ==
Taghiyev invested his fortune not only in the oil business but also in many other projects such as a textile factory (one of the 28 textile factories functioning in Russia at the time) and industrial fisheries along the shore of the Caspian Sea. He arranged for the construction of a mosque and evening self-education courses for the employees of the textile factory, a school for their children, a pharmacy, a first-aid post, and a mill. Altogether his project cost Taghiyev more than 6 million golden roubles. He sold his oil business interest to Anglo-Russian Oil Company for 5 million rubles. In two and a half years, they had earned more than 7.5 million rubles in net profit. It should be mentioned that Taghiyev sold his oil companies in order to diversify into other industries of the Caucasus's economy. He amassed shares in the Oleum Company established on the basis of these enterprises to the amount of 16 million rubles. This allowed him to continue accumulating capital created in the oil sector. During this period, Taghiyev invested significant sums into the textile, food, construction, and shipbuilding industries, as well as in fishery. Later, in 1890, Taghiyev bought the Caspian Steamship Company, renovated it, and created a fleet of 10 steamboats.

Taghiyev owned real estate in Baku, Moscow, Tehran, Isfahan, Anzali, and Rasht.

== Philanthropic work ==
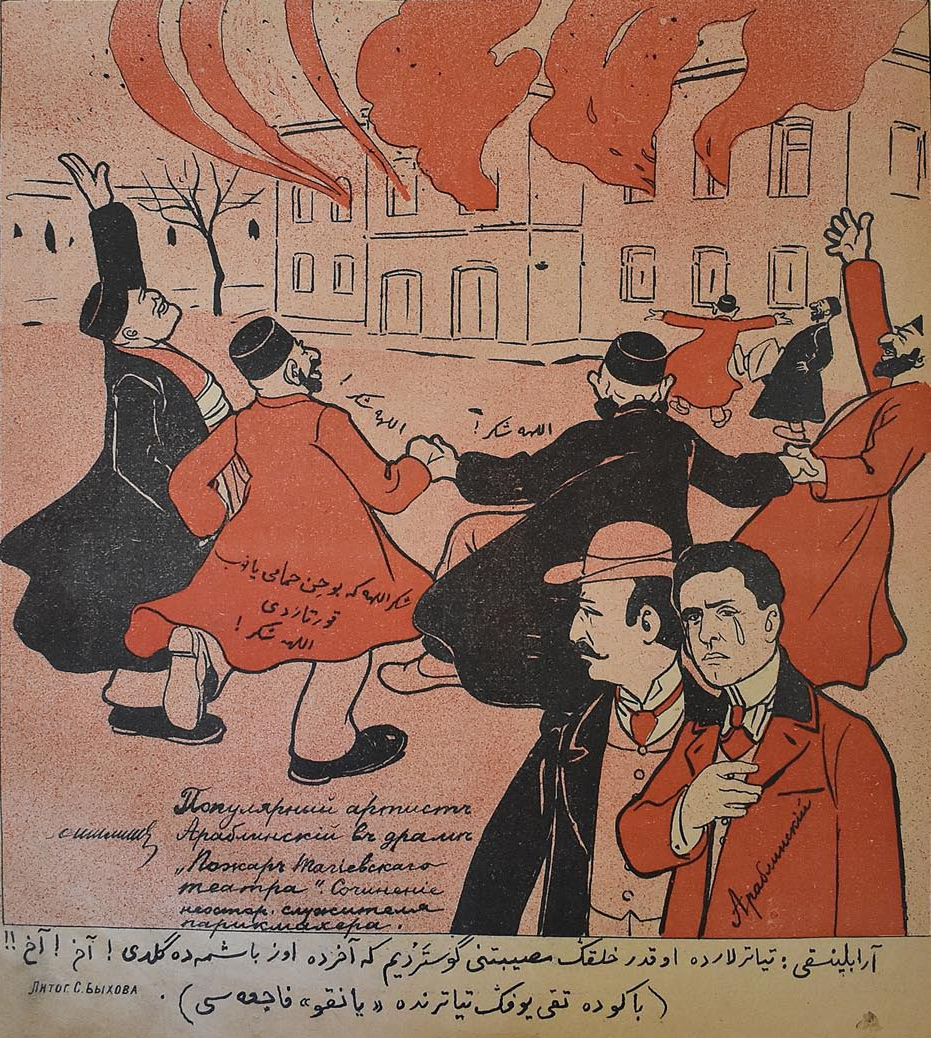
Fire in Theatre of Tagiyev in Molla Nasreddin

Despite the decades of anti-bourgeois Soviet propaganda that followed his lifetime, Taghiyev is revered by Azerbaijanis for his charity work. He sponsored the construction of the first Azerbaijani national theatre in 1883 (known as Taghiyev's Theatre, and later the Azerbaijan State Theatre of Musical Comedy) and helped to repair it after reactionists burned it down in 1909. In 1911, he covered all the expenses for the construction of what would later become the Azerbaijan State Academic Opera and Ballet Theatre.

Taghiyev provided 184,000 roubles to build the first secular Muslim school for girls in the Middle East in 1898–1900. He personally obtained the permission to build the school in his correspondence with Empress Alexandra. He also sponsored the construction of a school of agriculture in Mardakan in 1894 and the first technical school in the Baku Governorate in 1911. Taghiyev helped to maintain many city institutions and contributed to the adornment of Baku, including laying out parks and paving the streets. For this, he provided a 35-year loan of 750,000 roubles to the City Council in 1895. Together with five other businessmen, he financially assisted in establishing the horse tramway in Baku, which started functioning in 1892.

He helped to solve the water crisis in the city by helping to finance the Shollar water pipeline, which channeled water 100 miles away in the Caucasus Mountains, near Quba, via a ceramic pipeline. Taghiyev allocated 25,000 roubles to have the project completed. The construction of the water pipeline was finished by 1916. In 1886 Taghiyev sponsored the establishment of a fire department in Baku.

He provided scholarships for many Azerbaijani youths who strived for higher education in prestigious Russian and European universities. Some of them, such as writer Mammed Said Ordubadi, politicians Nariman Narimanov and Aziz Aliyev, professor Khudadat bey Malik-Aslanov, and opera singer Shovkat Mammadova, later rose to prominence. Though illiterate himself, Taghiyev was a proponent of academic enlightenment for the young generations of Azerbaijanis. While the clergy created obstacles for the publishing of secularism-oriented literature such as that by Seyid Azim Shirvani, Taghiyev would assist in getting it printed in his private publishing house in Tehran.

As a devout Muslim, Taghiyev was in favour of translating the Quran into Azerbaijani. This was vehemently opposed by the local clergy who believed the content of Koran was holy and of divine origin and therefore, no one had the right to translate it. Taghiyev then sent a mullah envoy to Baghdad who came back with an official permission from a board of Muslim scholars to translate the Koran from Arabic into Azerbaijani. Taghiyev ordered the necessary equipment from Leipzig and sponsored the translation and the publishing.

Taghiyev also allocated 11,000 roubles for the construction of the head office for the Muslim Benevolent Society in Saint Petersburg; 3,000 roubles for the education of Armenian orphans; 5,000 for the St. Nina's School for Girls in Baku; 10,000 roubles for the construction of the Alexander Nevsky Cathedral in Baku; tens of thousands of roubles for the construction and repair of mosques and madrasas throughout Russia and Persia., etc.

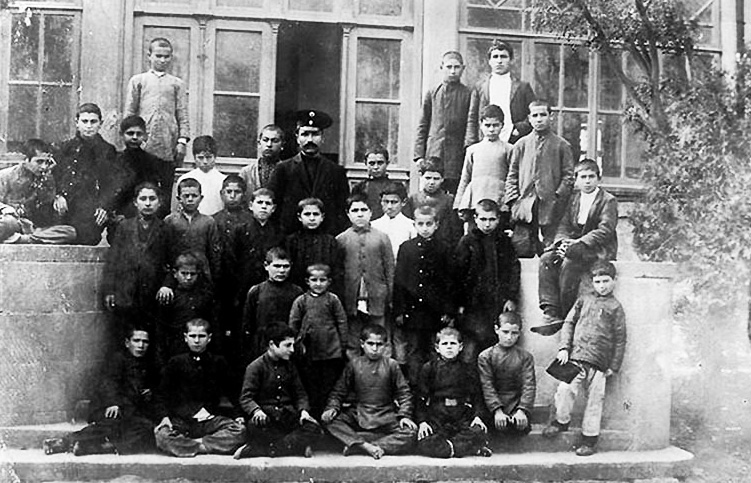
Farming and Horticulture School of Zeynalabdin Taghiyev in Mardakan

Known for his foresight, Taghiyev reinvested his oil profits into non-oil sectors such as textiles, shipping, and real estate. His textile factory, designed with worker accommodations, was unique for its time. Additionally, he co-founded the Baku Trade Bank and built one of the largest mills in Azerbaijan.

Taghiyev was deeply committed to public service and philanthropy, particularly in education. He funded the construction of schools, including the first school for Muslim girls in the Caucasus, which he named after Empress Alexandra Fedorovna. His contributions earned him recognition from both Russian royalty and the Azerbaijani people. He also provided scholarships for Azerbaijani students to study abroad, many of whom went on to become notable figures.

In the 19th century, the territory of modern Pakistan was occupied by British troops. It became a part of the British Empire. At the beginning of the 20th century, when the independence movement against British rule was on the rise, a pandemic of plague broke out. Experts say that there are two clinical varieties of plague - bubonic and pneumonic. A flea bite may cause the first one, while the second one is a severe version of bubonic plague. The worst thing is that pneumonic plague spreads like a flu and has 100% mortality rate. Over 100 thousand people died from the rapidly spreading deadly disease. It was possible to defeat this disease only by vaccinating those who had not yet fallen ill. And that' when Hajji Zeynalabdin Taghiyev bought and sent over 300 thousand ampoules of vaccine to Pakistan, which played a major role in the victory over this deadly disease. He also sent funds to help free Pakistan from British rule. In 1947, after Pakistan gained independence, this fact was included in the training manual of Pakistan, and since then the Pakistani people consider Azerbaijan a fraternal state and fully support Baku's position on the Karabakh settlement.

For his outstanding contributions, Taghiyev was twice-awarded with the Order of Saint Stanislaus, as well as with a number of other orders and medals from both Russia and abroad.

== Family ==
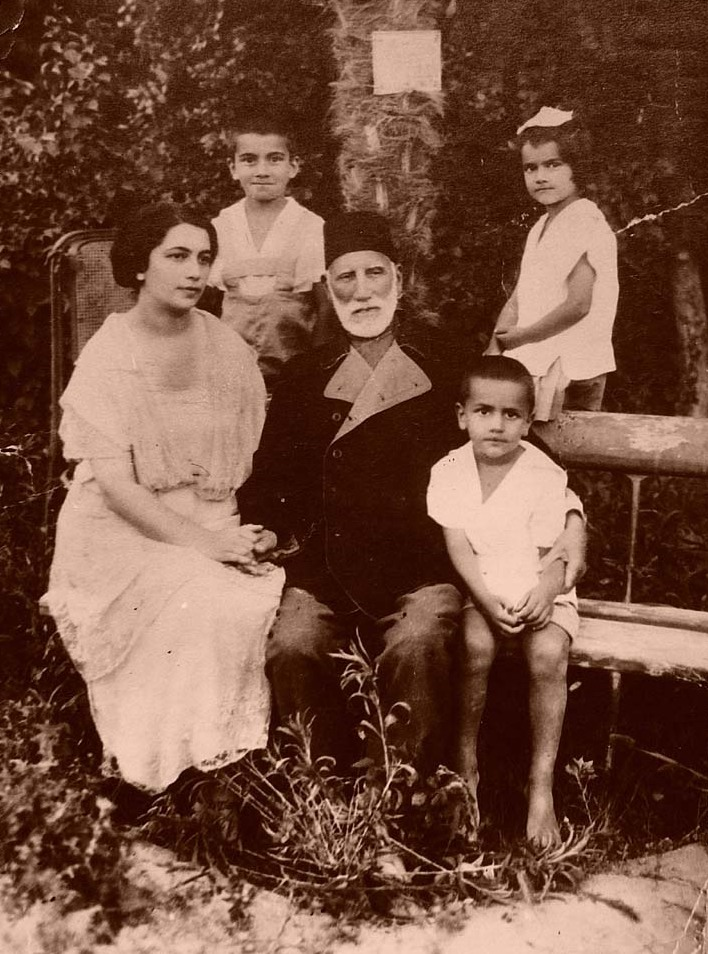
Taghiyev one year prior to his death, accompanied by his daughter Leyla and his grandchildren

Taghiyev was married twice. His first wife Zeynab, who was also his cousin, bore him three children. After her death, Taghiyev married Sona, the youngest daughter of General Balakishi Arablinski. The wedding took place in 1896. Arablinski's elder daughter Nurjahan had already been married to Taghiyev's older son Ismayil. His grandson Ilkin Taghiyev is a film director and photographer.

Taghiyev sent his daughters Leyla and Sara to study at the prestigious Smolny Institute for Noble Maidens in Saint Petersburg, from where his second wife Sona had once graduated.

== Later life ==
After Azerbaijan's Sovietization in 1920 the country's wealthy suffered severe repressions from the Bolshevik government, resulting in the emigration of many of them. Taghiyev's house and his other possessions were therefore confiscated. Due to his past contributions and generosity, he was given the option of choosing a place of residence for himself. Taghiyev chose to stay in his summer cottage in the village of Mardakan, not far from Baku. He died there four years later, on 1 September 1924 of pneumonia. After his death, the summer cottage was confiscated and Taghiyev's family members were evicted. His wife Sona, once a wealthy, educated, and charitable noblewoman of the Caucasus, died in misery on the streets of Baku in 1938.

The Azerbaijan State Museum of History is located in the former Taghiyev mansion in Baku.

== Picture gallery ==
Tagiyev

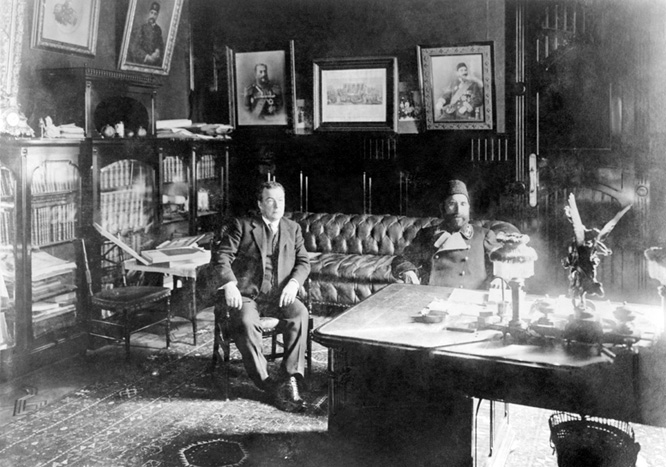
Tagiyev in his office

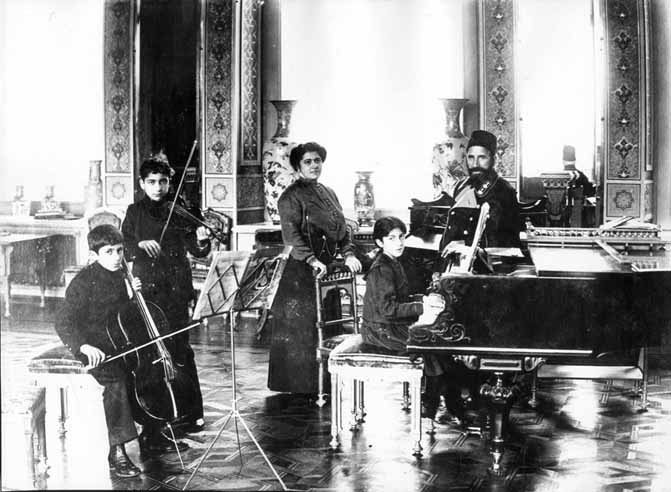
Tagiyev family at his mansion

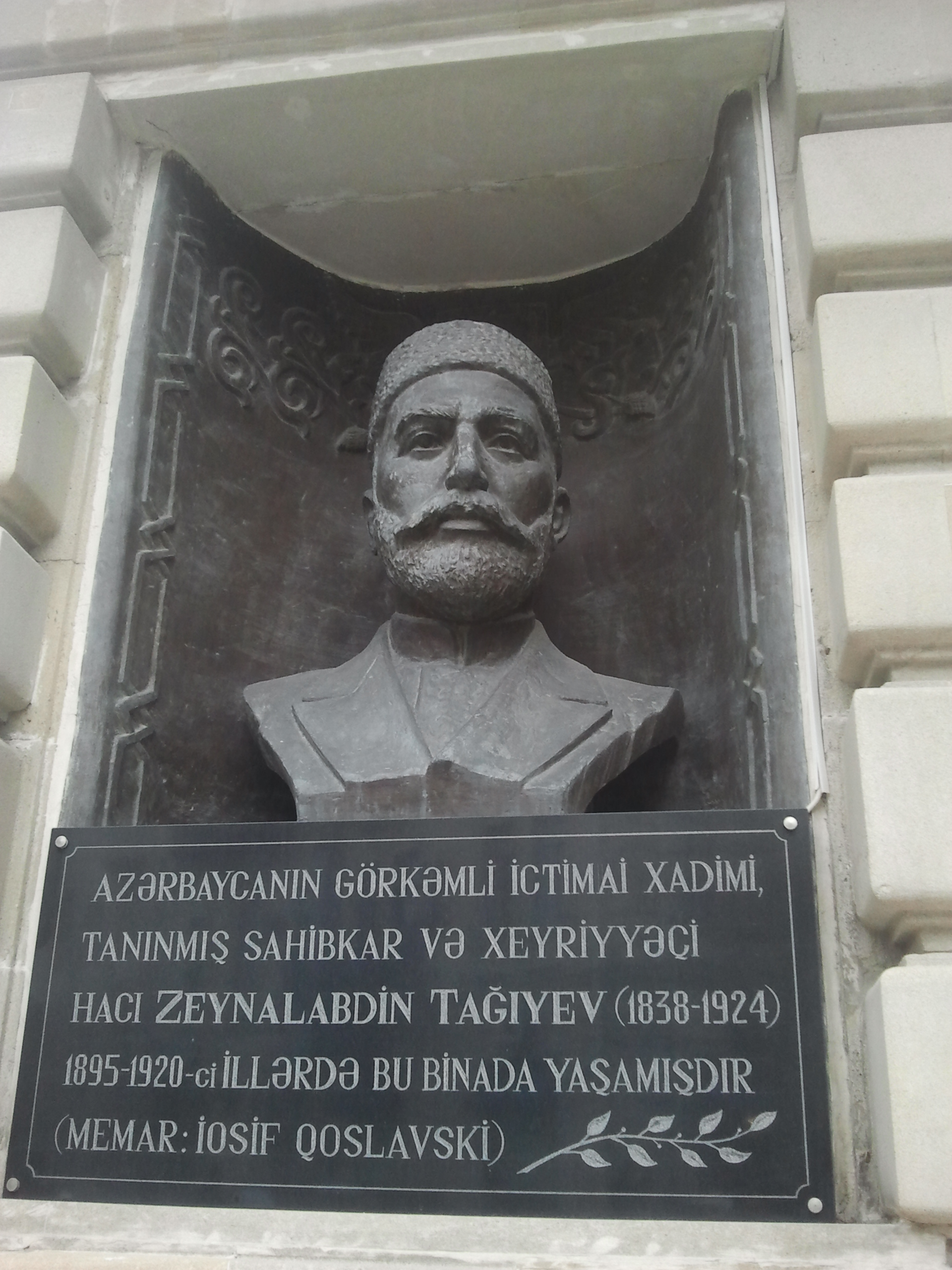
Bust of Taghiyev
