= Balakishi Arablinski =

Balakishi Alibey-oghlu Arablinski
- Balakişi Əlibəy oğlu Ərəblinski
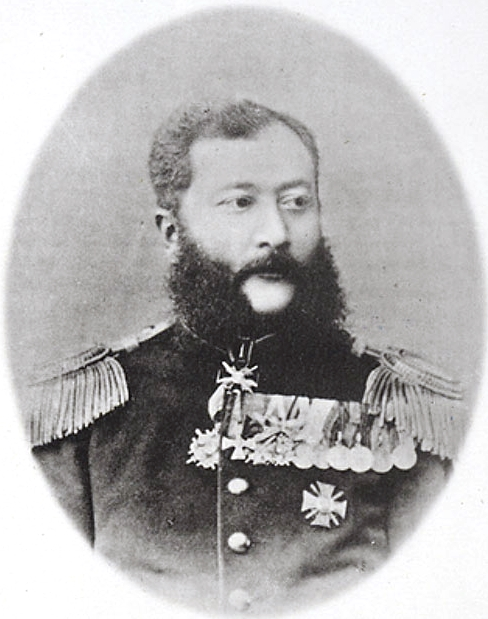
- Born: 1828; Tala village, Zaqatala district
- Died: 1902 (aged 73–74); Derbent
- Military career
- Allegiance: Imperial Russian Army
- Service years: 1848–1896
- Rank: Lieutenant-general
- Commands: Abkhaz 160th Infantry Regiment
- Conflicts: Hungarian Campaign; Crimean War; Russo-Turkish War

Balakishi Arablinski Alibey oglu (Azerbaijani: Balakişi Ərəblinski Əlibəy oğlu; 1828 – 2 January 1902) was an Avar general in the Russian Imperial Army.

Arablinski was born to the family of a local nobleman Alibey Arablinski in 1828 in the village of Tala (Zaqatala district). His family lived in Arablar quarter; hence the family name Arablinski. Arablinski graduated from the St. Petersburg Cadet Corps earning a rank of cornet in 1848. In 1849, he took part in quelling the uprising in Hungary under the command of Fieldmarshal Ivan Paskevich. For his bravery in the battle near the castle of Világos in Hungary he was awarded the order of St. Stanislaus.

During the Crimean War, he served as battalion commander and was awarded the Order of St. Anna decorated with swords. The Muslim cavalry battalion in which he served was famous for the bravery of many officers.

The last war Arablinski participated in was the Russo-Turkish War, 1877–1878.

In March 1887 he was promoted to Major General. In August 1891, Arablinski was awarded the order of St. Stanislaus 1st degree. Lieutenant General Balakishi Arablinski retired from the army in 1896 and lived on imperial pension on his Derbent estate until his death on 2 January 1902.

His family is connected to hereditary khans of Derbent and his daughter Sona was married to Hajji Zeynalabdin Taghiyev, an Azeri oil millionaire.

== Sources ==
- Sh. Nazirli "Azerbaycan Generallari" Baku, Ganclik, 1991. OCLC 74566808
