= Tbilisi Marriott Hotel =

Hotel in Tbilisi, Georgia

- სასტუმრო თბილისი მარიოტი

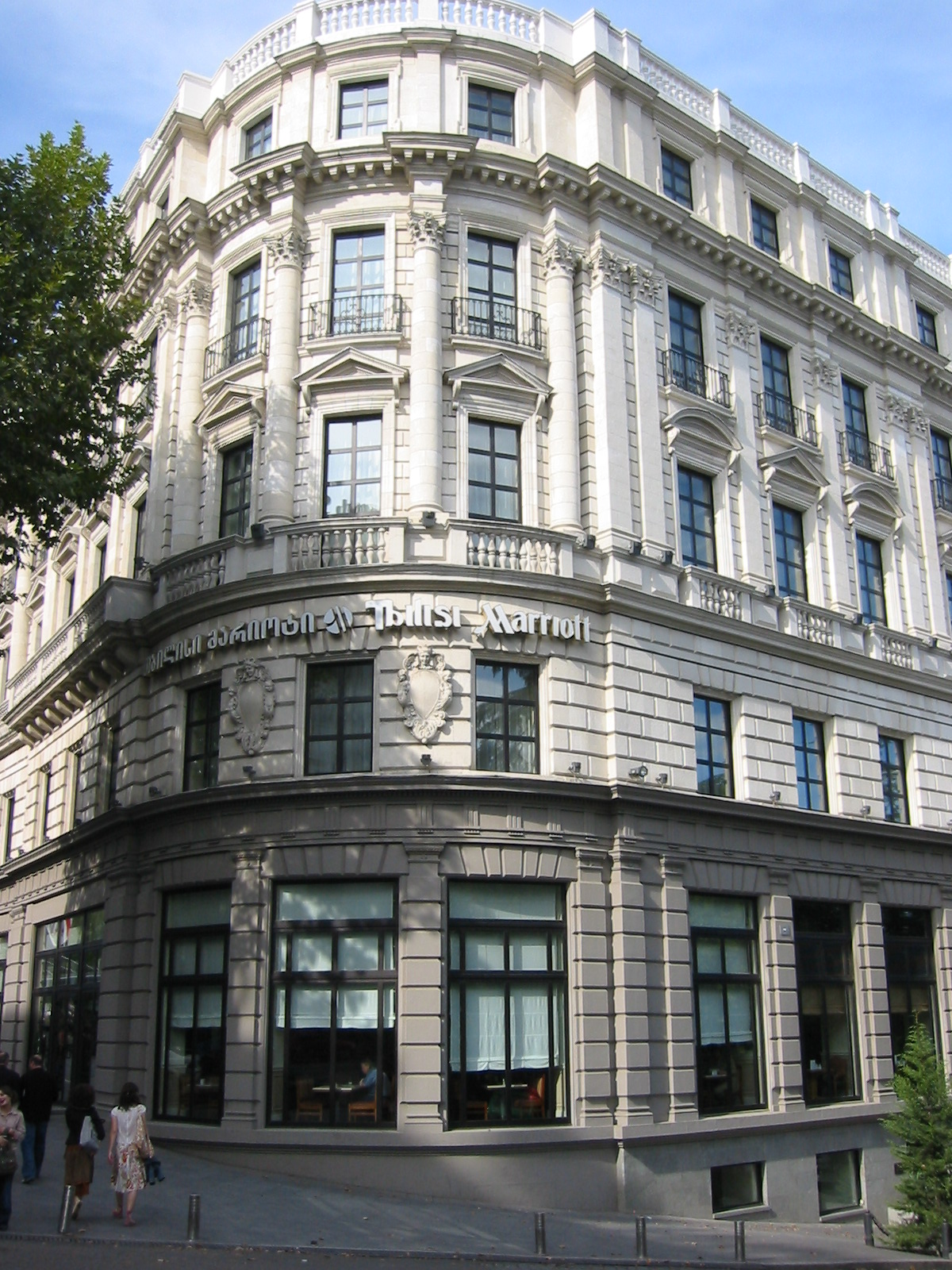
- Interactive map of the Tbilisi Marriott Hotel area
- Former names: Hotel Majestic Tiflis
- Hotel chain: Marriott Hotels & Resorts

General information
- Status: Completed
- Type: Luxury hotel
- Architectural style: Renaissance and Baroque
- Classification: 5 stars
- Location: 13, Shota Rustaveli Avenue, Tbilisi, Georgia
- Coordinates: 41.69906°N 44.79813°E
- Construction started: 1911
- Completed: 1915
- Opened: 1915 (111 years ago) as Hotel Majestic Tiflis; 22 July 2002 (24 years ago) as Tbilisi Marriott Hotel
- Renovated: 2002 (24 years ago)

Technical details
- Floor count: 6

Design and construction
- Architects: Alexander Ozerov; Gabriel Ter-Mikelov

Other information
- Number of rooms: 116
- Number of suites: 11
- Number of restaurants: 2
- Number of bars: 2
- Facilities: Health Club & Meeting Space

Website
- marriott.com/tbsmc

Cultural Heritage Monument of Georgia
- Official name: Tbilisi Marriott Hotel
- Designated: October 1, 2007; 18 years ago
- Reference no.: 4812
- Item Number in Cultural Heritage Portal: 4463
- Date of entry in the registry: October 11, 2007; 18 years ago
- Accounting Card / Passport #: 010307202

The Tbilisi Marriott Hotel (Georgian: სასტუმრო თბილისი მარიოტი) is a luxury five-star hotel located on Rustaveli Avenue in Tbilisi, Georgia. Built as a high-class hotel on the commission of the wealthy Armenian merchant Mikael Aramyants, it was opened in 1915 as Hôtel Majestic (Georgian: სასტუმრო მაჟესტიკი).

During World War I, from 1915 to 1917, the hotel accommodated a military hospital before it could be opened for the public. After the Soviet invasion of Georgia, the building was transferred into Trade Palace for workers. In February 1939, the refurbished building was restored to its original function as Hotel Tbilisi. Heavily damaged by fire during the December 1991–January 1992 coup d'etat, a prelude to the Georgian Civil War, it was reconstructed from 1995 to 2002. On 26 September 2002, a Marriott Hotel was opened in the building.

== History ==
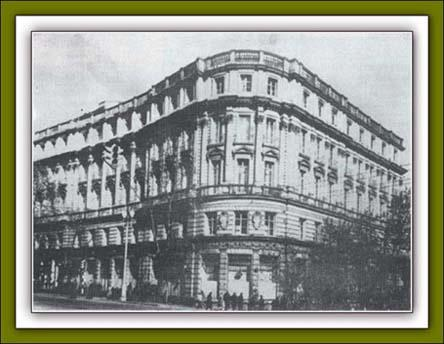
Tbilisi Marriott Hotel, formerly the Aramyants Hotel, c. 1917

The hotel, intended to become the best in Tbilisi, then capital of the Russian-ruled Georgia and the larger Caucasus region, was designed by Aleksandr Ozerov in 1911 and later remodeled by Gabriel Ter-Mikelov at the behest of Mikael Aramyants. Its construction was completed in 1915 and named Hôtel Majestic. During World War I, from 1915 to 1917, the hotel accommodated a military hospital before it could be opened for the public. After the Soviet takeover of Georgia in 1921, the building was transferred to the Trade Unions. Its ground floor was used for multiple purposes, housing a typography and shops, while a basement was turned into a cinema. In February 1939, the refurbished building was restored to its original function as Hotel Tbilisi run by the state-owned travel agency Intourist. After being damaged by fire during the 1991-1992 coup d'etat, it was reconstructed under the guidance of the architects G. Metreveli and V. Kurtishvili from 1995 to 2002. On 26 September 2002, the Tbilisi Marriott Hotel was opened in the building.

== Architecture and facilities ==
The hotel is a seven-story building, with five stories above ground. Its lavish façades retain their original design, utilizing elements of the Renaissance and Baroque architecture, such as rustification, massive semi-circular and flat pilasters with Corinthian capitals, and triangular and circular pediments rested upon stone brackets. Large columns accentuate the front entrance, facing Rustaveli Avenue. The main façade also contains a massive entablature and attic, with a moulded balustrade parapet.

The hotel offers 116 rooms and 11 suites, including one vice-presidential and two presidential, as well as 9 conferences halls, lobby bar, restaurant, patio, a wellness centre for fitness, and other facilities.
