= House of Shamsi Asadullayev =

- Şəmsi Əsədullayevin evi (Azerbaijani); Haus von Shamsi Asadullayev (German)
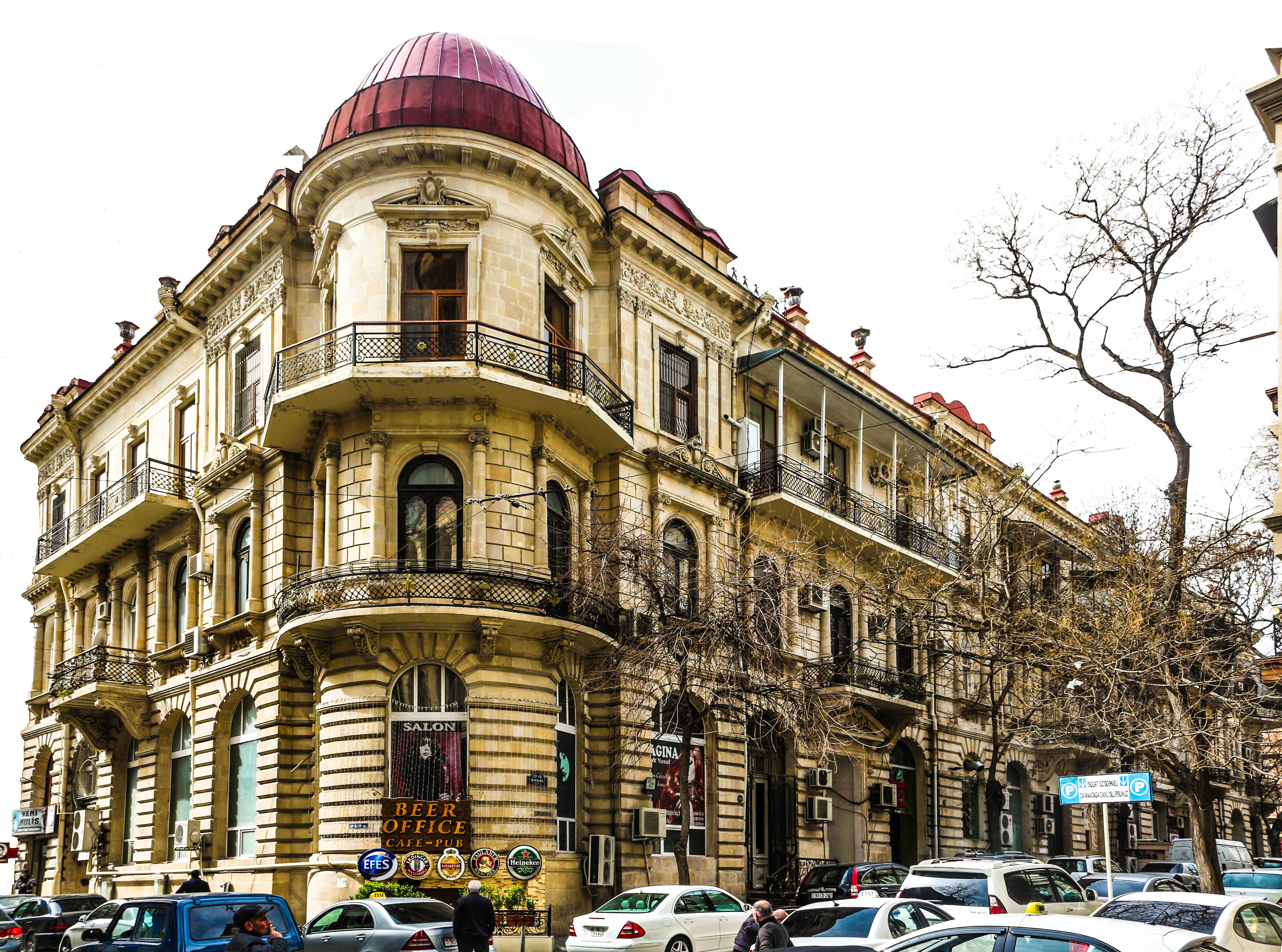
- Interactive map of House of Shamsi Asadullayev
- Location: Azerbaijan

History
- Built: 1896

Site notes
- Area: Baku
- Architect: Johann Edel
- Owner: Shamsi Asadullayev

The House of Shamsi Asadullayev- also known as the Oil Baron's Palace, is a three-story palace-style residential building located in the capital city of Baku, Azerbaijan. It was constructed in 1896 based on the design by German architect Johann Edel in response to a commission from Shamsi Asadullayev, one of the millionaires of Baku.

The building was included in the list of locally significant immovable historical and cultural monuments by Decision No. 132 of the Cabinet of Ministers of the Republic of Azerbaijan on August 2, 2001.

== About ==
=== History ===
The House of Shamsi Asadullayev, located at the addresses of Mardanov Brothers (Prachechnaya) Street 9, Tolstoy (Gymnasicheskaya) Street 183, and Hazi Aslanov (Karantinnaya) Street 84, was constructed in palace style and is attributed to the millionaire Shamsi Asadullayev. It was built in 1896 by the architect Johann Edel. Due to Shamsi Asadullayev being referred to as the "King of Oil and Kerosene," the palace is sometimes called the "Oil Baron's Palace." The headquarters of his companies were also located on the ground floor of this building.

Asadullayev's granddaughter, French-based writer Banine, also grew up in this palace. According to her memoirs, after the Soviet occupation, the palace was confiscated, and only two rooms were allocated for their family to live in.

After Azerbaijan regained its independence, the building was included in the list of locally significant immovable historical and cultural monuments by Decision No. 132 of the Cabinet of Ministers of the Republic of Azerbaijan on August 2, 2001.

=== Architecture ===
The semi-circular corners of the building, which is located at the intersection of three streets, completed with a dome, are specially marked in the plan. The corner solution of the building was designed by architect I. This is the case in Edel's work. The architecture of the building is built in classical forms, the volume is enriched with plastic and numerous balconies with large stone brackets.

After its construction, the first floor of the palace was given to service offices and offices. A two-row system is applied to the side blocks, which connects the blocks with a long three-row system. Architect Edel extended the corner hall diagonally and partially increased the useful area. The ground floor, with its high pediment and large semi-circular window eyes, has an impressive monumentality and perfection of resolution. The second floor is more luxurious due to its interior planning. The facade is represented by small porticoes of Ionic order columns and cornice with raised profiled brackets. The third floor is actively integrated into the structure of the facade with large window eyes profiled with thin borders and with convexly carved keystones. The window eyes are finished with decorated pilasters from the Corinthian order. Stone capitals give natural beauty to the facade, above them there is a relief frieze and a main cornice with an ornamental motif from the classical arsenal.

== Photos ==
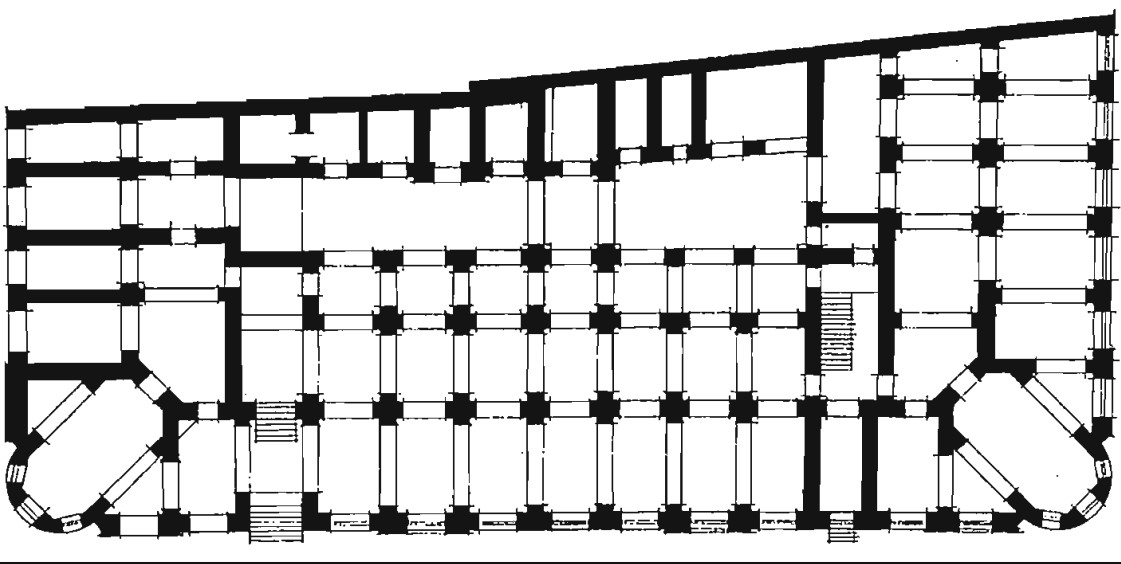
The plan of house

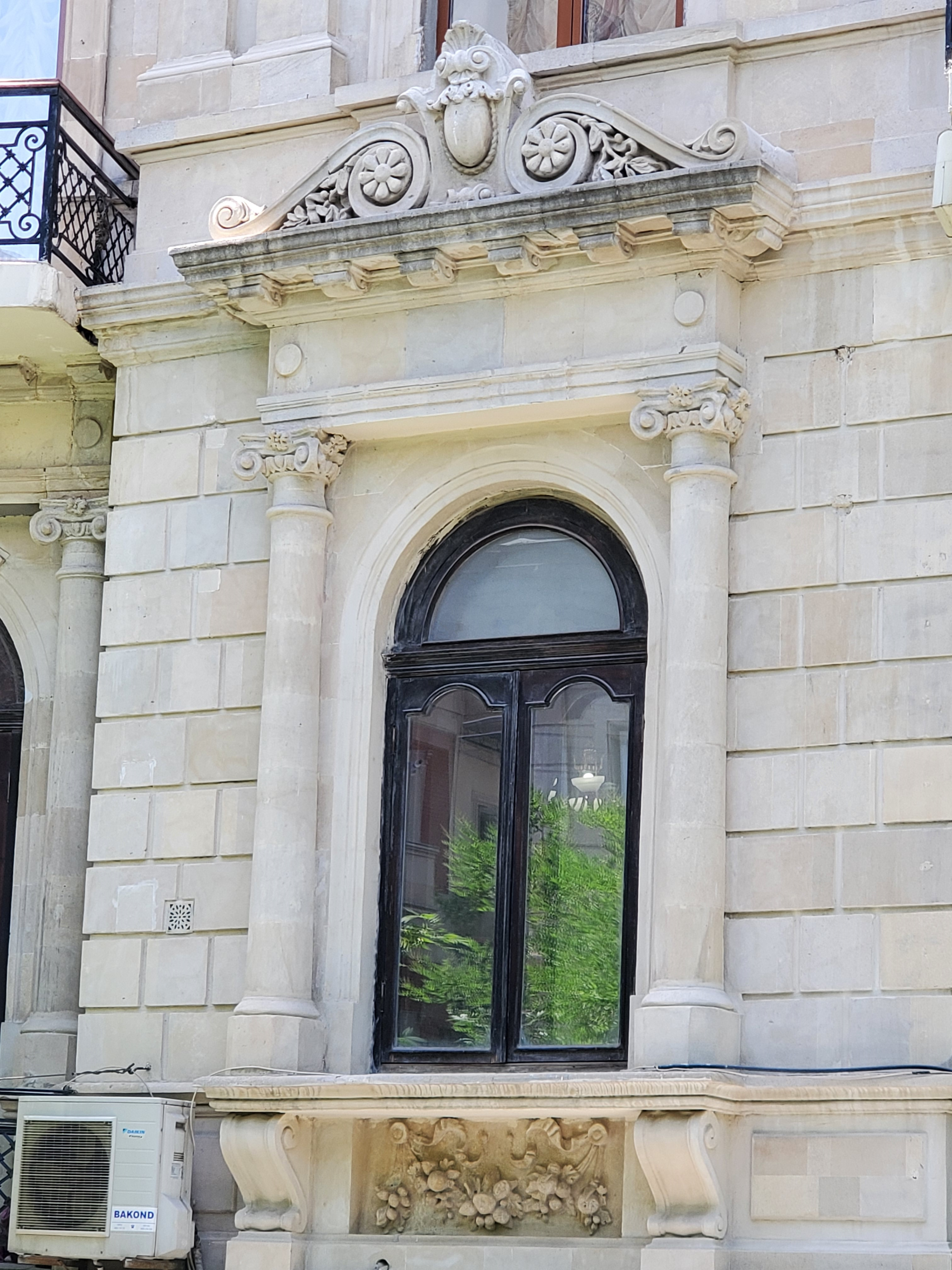

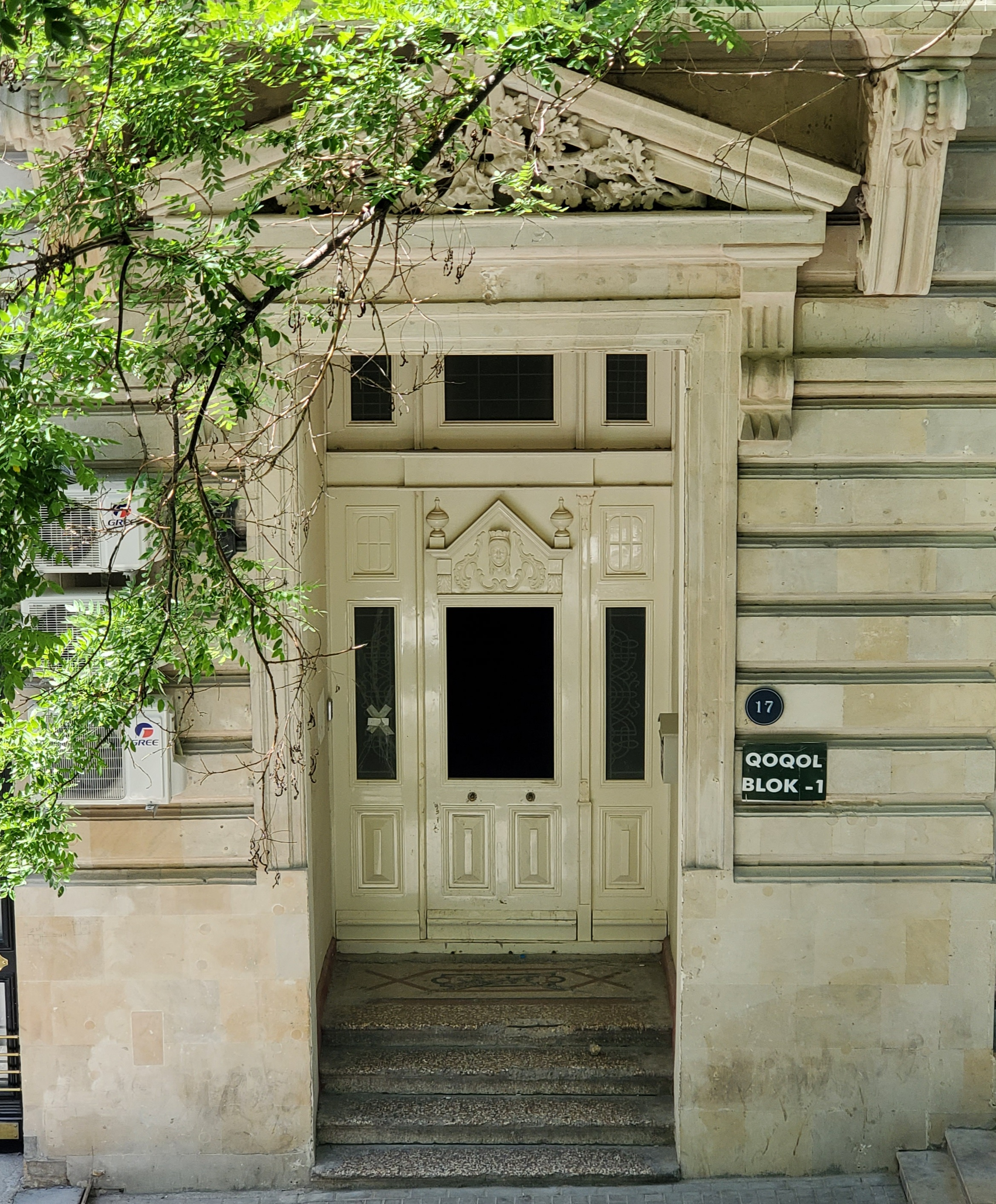

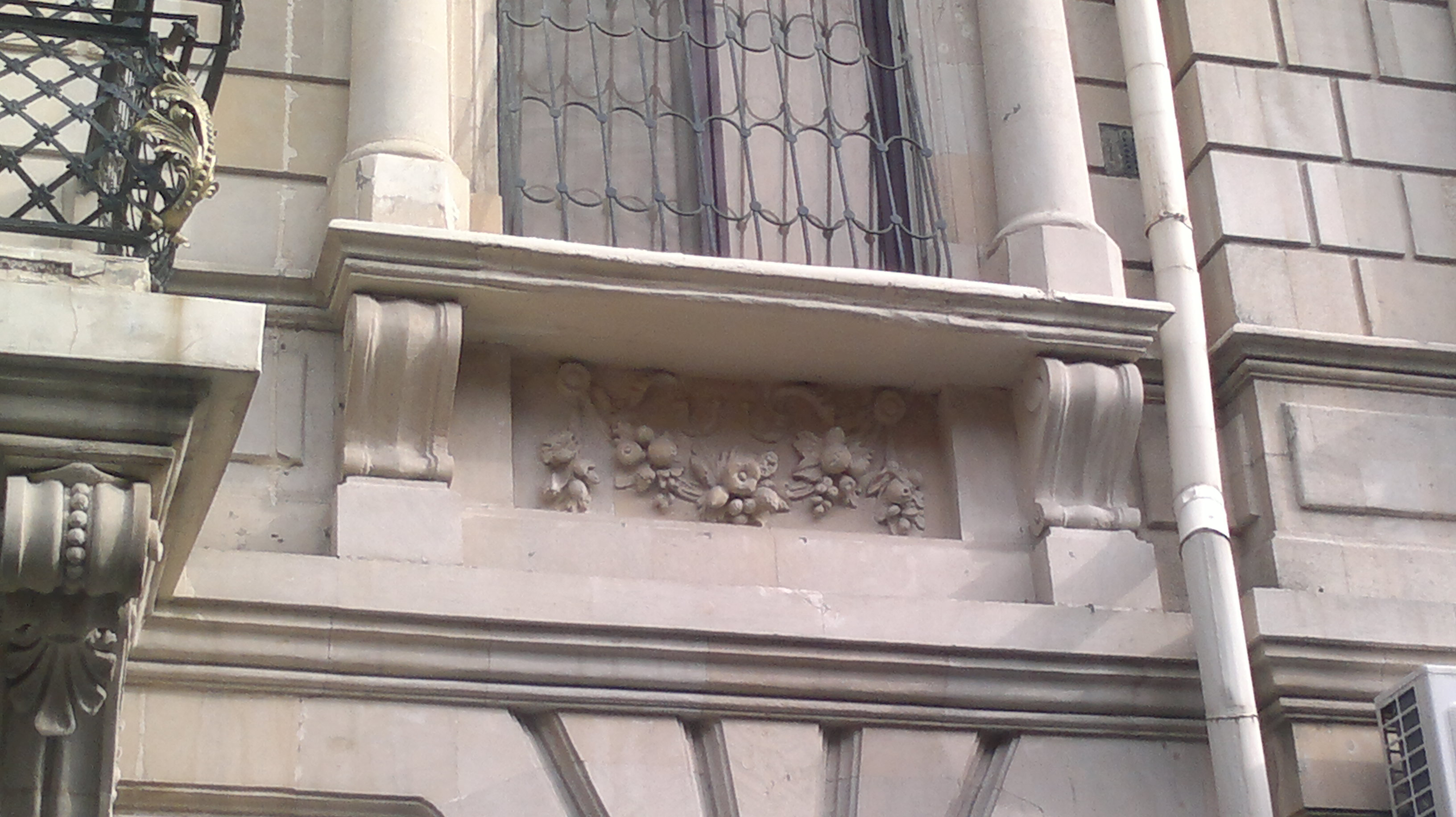

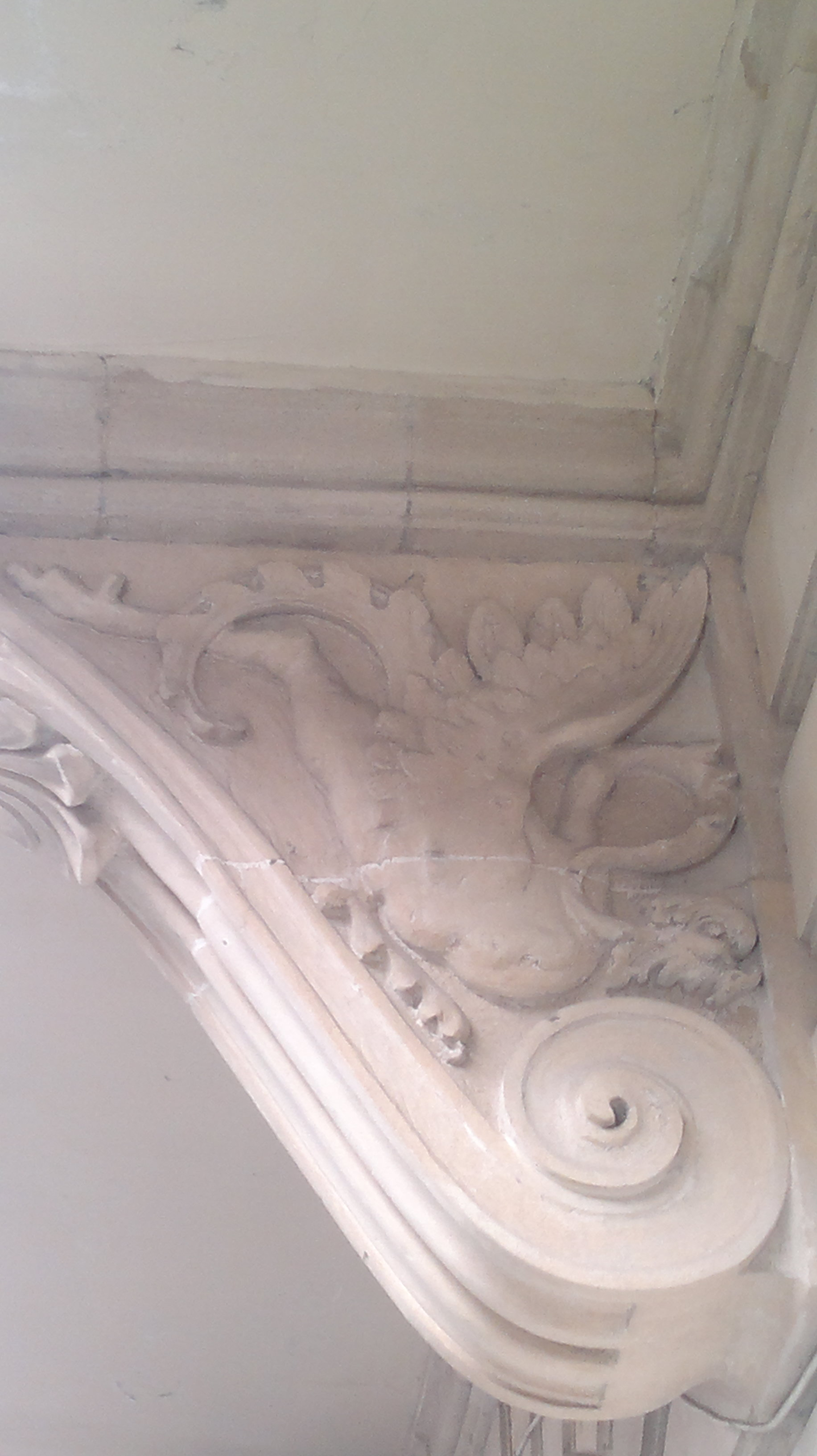

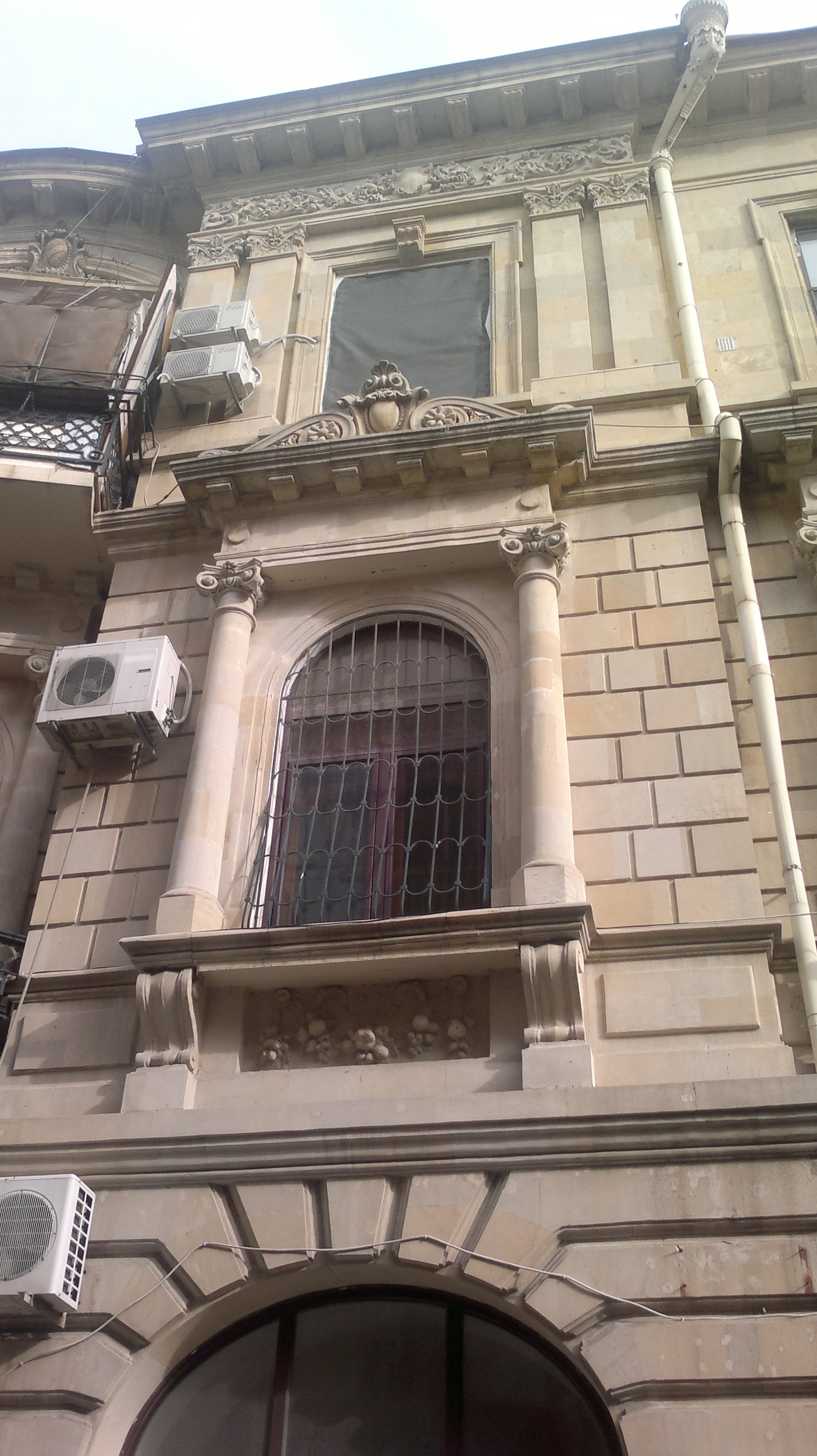

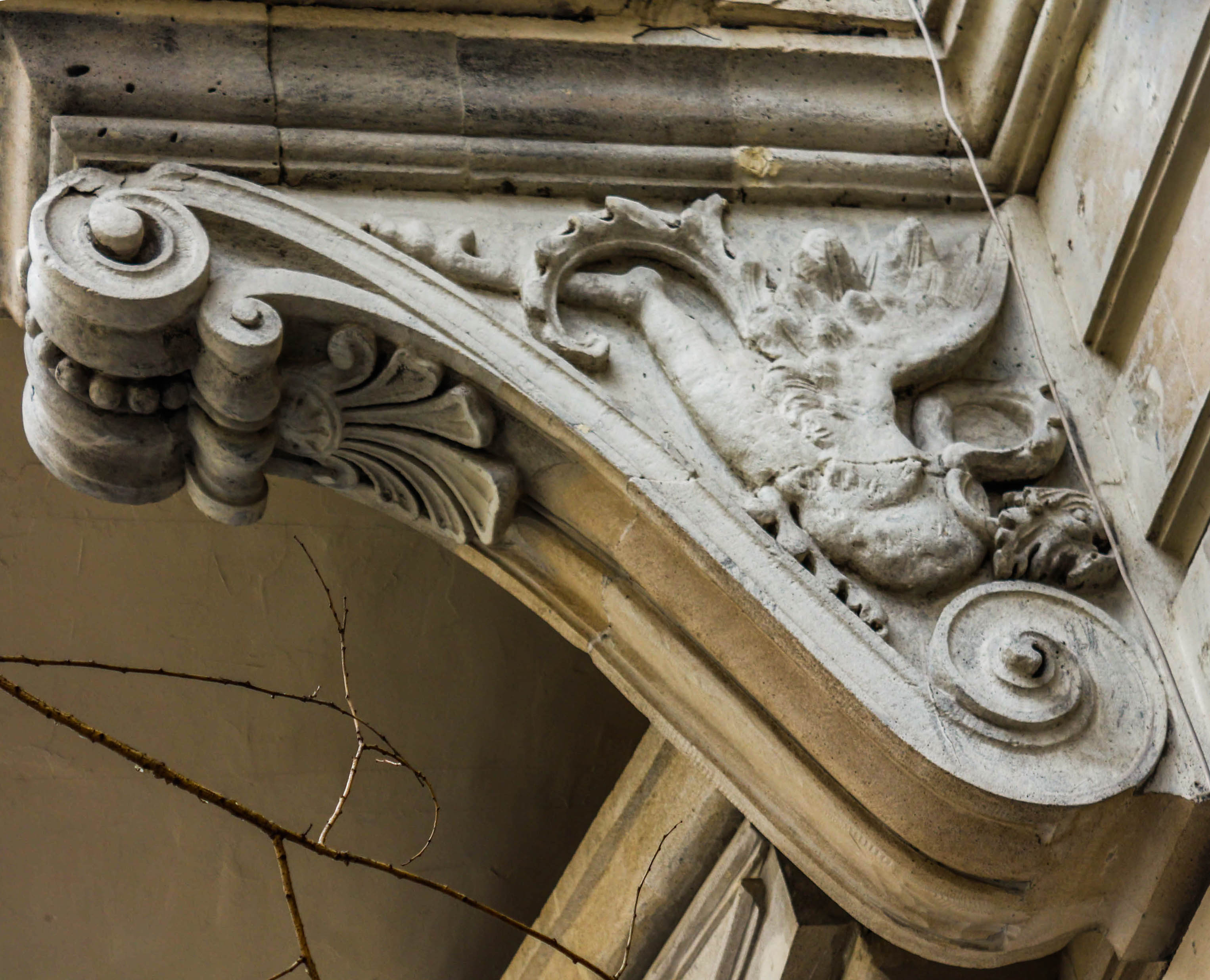

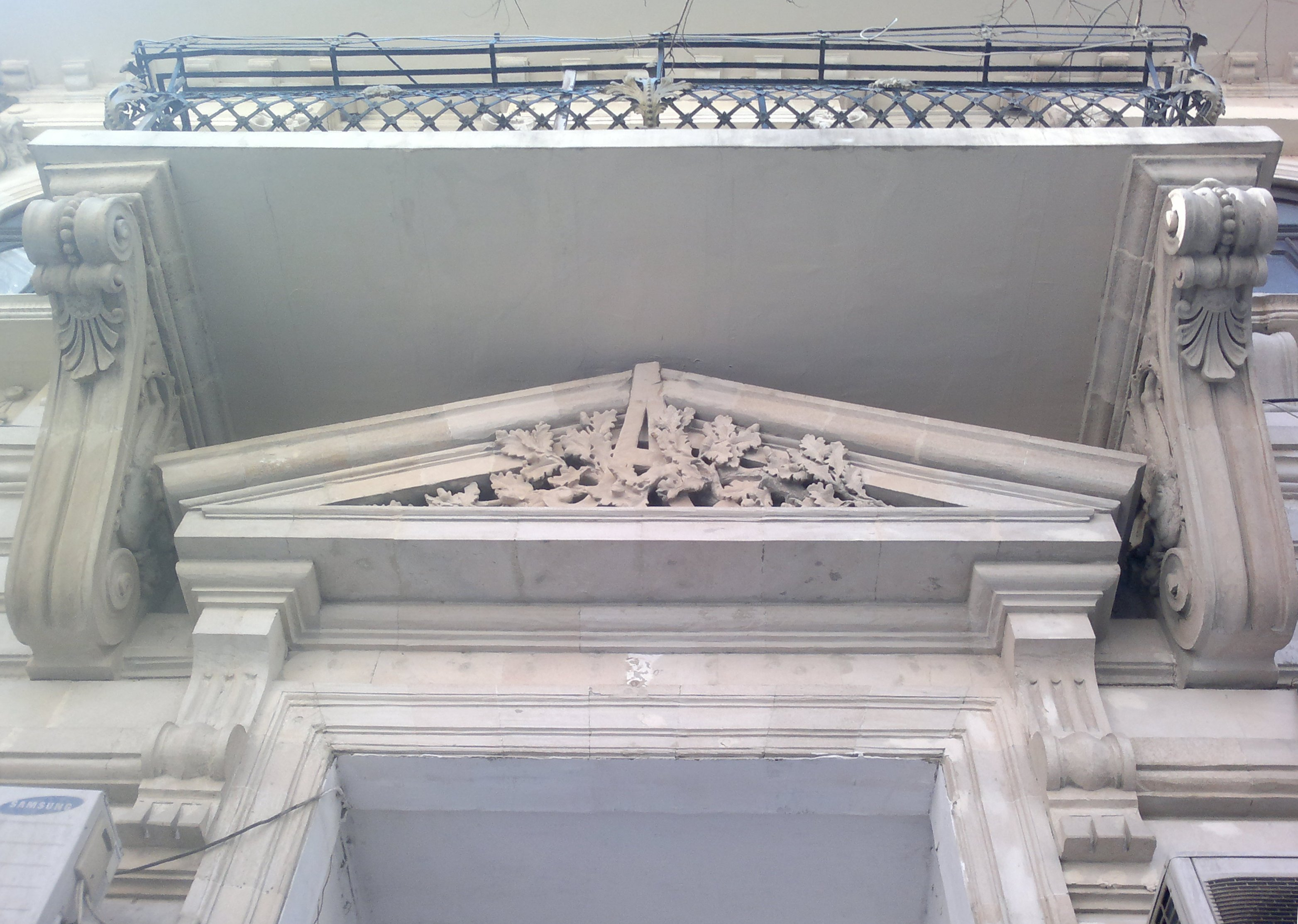
