= Souren Melikian =

French-Iranian art historian and curator

Assadullah Souren Melikian-Chirvani, also known as Souren Melikian (born 5 December 1936), is a French-Iranian art historian, art critic, and curator. He is a renowned scholar of Iranian culture, and its sphere of influence.

== Background ==
He was born on 5 December 1936, in Paris to an Armenian father, Kevork Melikian (Georgiy Melikov), and Azerbaijani mother, Kawsar Asadullayeva. His father was accused of taking part in March Days, but he was not found guilty after it was found out that he was defending his Muslim friend. Melikian's paternal grandfather Ambartsum Melikov was an oil billionaire who owned A.S.Melikov and Co in Baku. His maternal-grandfather was Mirza Asadullayev and thus was a nephew to Banine. He grew up with his mother after losing father in 1945.

== Education and career ==
After completing high school in Lycee Condorcet, Melikian graduated from the Sorbonne and the Institut national des langues et civilisations orientales (INALCO). He has served as (since 2005) as Chair of Middle Eastern History at the French National Centre for Scientific Research (CNRS). He was named emeritus research director in 2007. He wrote weekly columns on art history and art markets for the International Herald Tribune since 1969. Between 2011 and 2013 he wrote for The New York Times. He has served as Senior Collections Adviser for the Aga Khan Museum.
