= Agha Aminov =

Azerbaijani statesman

Agha Aminov Ağa Əminov
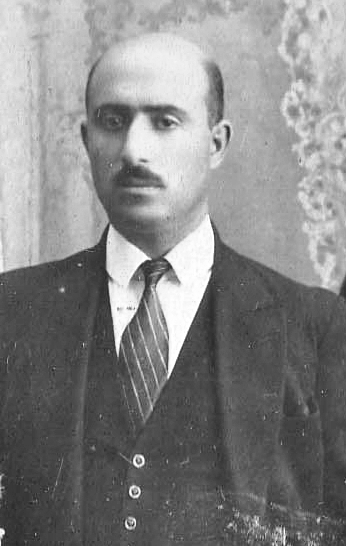

Minister of Industry and Trade of Azerbaijan Democratic Republic (ADR)
- In office March 14, 1919 – December 22, 1919
- President: Nasib bey Yusifbeyli Prime Minister, (Chairman of Azerbaijani Parliament)
- Preceded by: Mirza Asadullayev
- Succeeded by: Khudadat bey Malik-Aslanov (acting)

Personal details
- Born: 1888 Baku, Azerbaijan
- Died: 1922 (aged 33–34) Baku, Azerbaijan

Agha Mashadi Aghakerim oghlu Aminov (Azerbaijani: Ağa Məşədi Ağakərim oğlu Əminov; 1888–1922), also spelled as Agha Aminov, was an Azerbaijani statesman who served as Minister of Industry and Trade in the fourth cabinet of Azerbaijan Democratic Republic, and was member of Parliament of ADR.

== Early years ==
Aminov was born in 1888 in Baku, Azerbaijan. He graduated cum laude from Baku Gymnasium in 1907. He then moved to Peterburg and graduated from Electrotechnical Studies of Saint Petersburg State Polytechnical University in 1916. While a student, he worked as a manager at Pyatigorsk Power Station. After his return to Azerbaijan, he worked as an engineer at Sabunchi-Surakhany onshore oil fields. Aminov was one of the first Azerbaijani engineers along with Farrukh Vezirov and Behbud Khan Javanshir who specialized in oil production in mountainous terrain. In 1912, Aminov left for London to attend oil industry training course.

== Political career ==
In 1912, Aminov became a member of Musavat and attended Baku Congress of Caucasian Muslims in April 1917 and Musavat's First Congress on October 26 through 31, 1917. After establishment of Azerbaijan Democratic Republic on May 28, 1918, Aminov was elected to the National Assembly of Azerbaijan. When the fourth government under Nasib Yusifbeyli was formed on March 14, 1919, Aminov was appointed Minister of Industry and Trade. While a minister, he established Muslim Union of Noble Workers in May, 1919 and played a vital role in foundation of Baku State University. With formation of the fifth government, he was replaced by Khudadat bey Malik-Aslanov on December 22, 1919.

After Bolshevik take over of Azerbaijan, Aminov worked in Azerneft oil company. He died in 1922 from illness. He's recognized as one of distinctive politicians who played an important role in establishment of the first secular Muslim state in the East.

== See also ==
- Azerbaijani National Council
- Cabinets of Azerbaijan Democratic Republic (1918–1920)
- Current Cabinet of Azerbaijan Republic
