= Saint Bartholomew Church (Baku) =

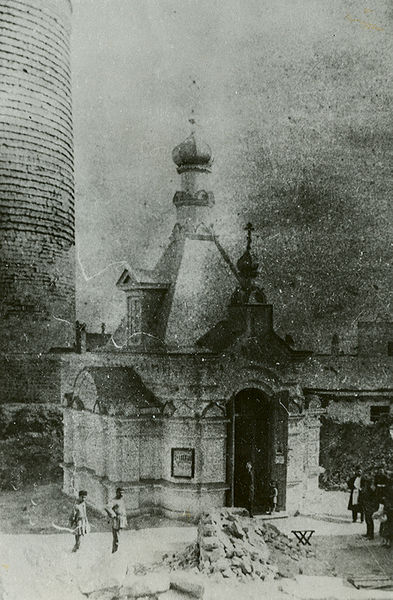
- Before the destruction of Saint Bartholomew Church
- Saint Bartholomew Church
- Location: Old City, A. Zeynally st. 67
- Country: Azerbaijan
- Denomination: orthodox

History
- Founded: 1892

Architecture
- Architect: Johann Edel
- Closed: 1936

Saint Bartholomew Church (Azerbaijani: Müqəddəs Varfolomey kilsəsi, German: Sankt Bartholomäus Kirche, Russian: Церковь Святого Варфоломея) was a church that existed in the Old City of Baku, Azerbaijan.

== About ==
St. Bartholomew Church was built in 1892 with donations from the local Christian population on the site where the Apostle Bartholomew was believed to have been killed. It is believed that in this area near the Maiden Tower the apostle Bartholomew was crucified and killed by local pagans in 71 AD.

The interior of the small chapel-shaped orthodox church was decorated with icons of Bartholomew and other saints. The church was built by architect Johann Edel in the architectural style of Russian churches. It was built on the foundations of the first and oldest church in Baku. The church continued to operate until 1936, then it was demolished as a part of the Soviet campaign against religion.

In modern times, on the morning of June 24, the remembrance day of St. Bartholomew, the Baku diocese performs a moleben at the remains of the church. In 2003, Patriarch Bartholomew I of Constantinople brought some of the remains of St. Bartholomew to Baku as a gift to Azerbaijani Christians, and these remains are now kept in the Holy Myrrhbearers Cathedral. The remains of St. Bartholomew's Church were registered in 2015 as an archeological monument.
