= Griffin House (Baku) =

- Qrifonlu ev (Azerbaijani); Greifenhaus (German)
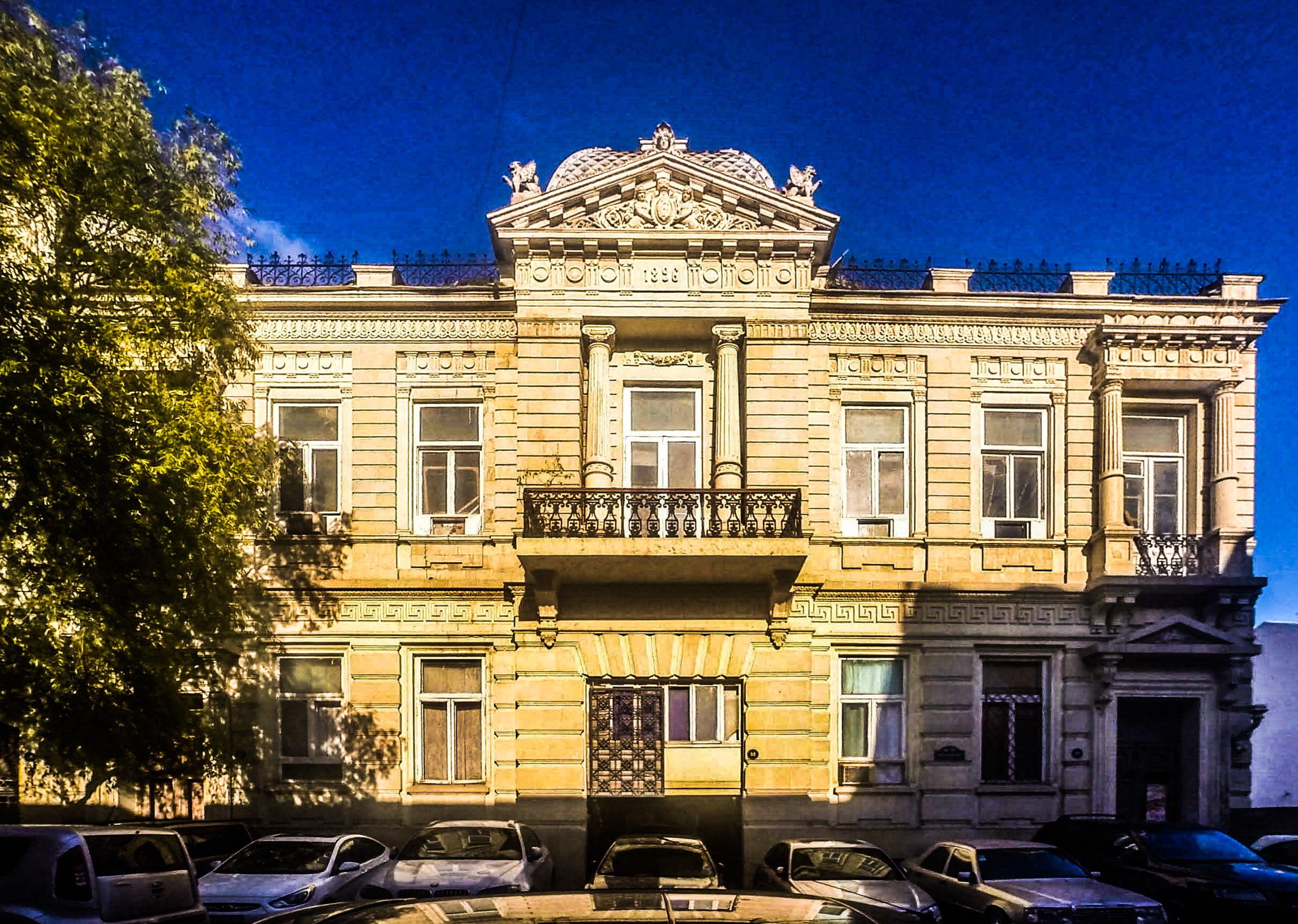
- Interactive map of the Griffin House area

General information
- Location: 20, Yusif Mammadaliyev Street Baku, Azerbaijan
- Coordinates: 40°22′17″N 49°50′20″E
- Construction started: 1894
- Completed: 1896
- Owner: B. Lazerev

Design and construction
- Architect: Johann Edel

Griffin House (Azerbaijani: Qrifonlu ev, German: Greifenhaus) is a two-storey mansion erected according to the order of B. Lazerev in 1894–1896, based on the project of the German architect Iohann Wilhelmovich Edel, located at 20 Yusif Mammadaliyev Street, Baku.

== History ==
This mansion, located on present-day Yusif Mammadaliyev Street, is believed to have originally belonged to the Lazarev family. Later, merchant Akopov moved into the building and established the ‘Münch und Weiss’ Trade Cooperation on its first floor. During the period of the Democratic Republic of Azerbaijan, the Georgian diplomatic representation was located in the building; at that time, Georgia’s Ambassador to Azerbaijan was N. Alshibay.

During the Soviet period, many wealthy Baku residents lived in the house. At one point, the house was incorporated into the main building of the nearby Institute of Theater. Following the demolition of the institute building, a large vacant area remained and gradually became swampy. After Azerbaijan regained its independence, the Georgian embassy was located in the building for a period before moving to another location.

== Architectural features ==
The mansion-type house was built by architect Iohann Wilhelmovich Edel in 1894–1896. The building was generally adapted to the architectural structure of Yusif Mammadaliyev Street, but differs from surrounding buildings due to its classic forms, architectural elements. The top of the house was decorated with griffins and that's why it is called ‘House with Griffins’.
