= Johann Edel =

Russian architect and state councilor of German origin

Russian: Эдель, Иван Васильевич
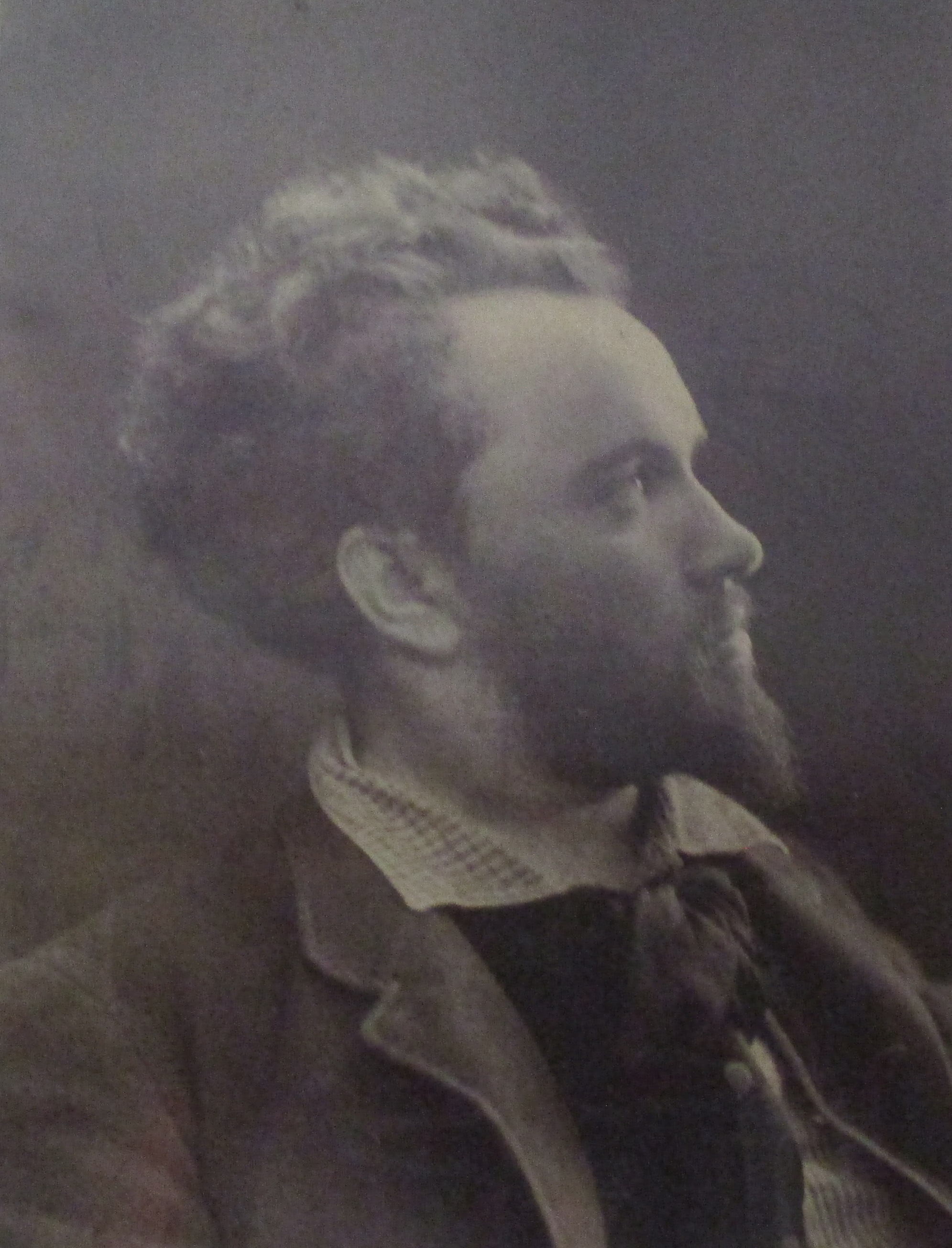
- Born: Johann Edel; 1863; Bilovach, Borznyansky Uyezd, Chernigov province
- Died: February 14, 1932 (aged 68–69); Baku, Azerbaijan Soviet Socialist Republic
- Other names: İvan Edel
- Occupation: Architect
- Spouse: Grazia Nikolaevna Spodavekia
- Buildings: House with Griffins; Mitrofanov's Residence; Saint Bartholomew Church

Johann Edel or Ivan Edel – Russian architect of German origin, and state councilor. Architect of many historical buildings in Baku, Azerbaijan, such as Mitrofanov's Residence, House with Griffins.

== Biography ==
=== Young years ===
Johann Wilhelmovich Edel was born in 1863 in the German colony Bilovach, Borznyansky Uyezd, Chernigov province, in the family of Wilhelm Genrikhovich Edel, the honorary citizen of German origin, who later worked at the Baku lighthouse.

After baptism in the Orthodox Church, Johann Wilhelmovich Edel received the name Johann Vasilievich, and was known in the world as Ivan Vasilievich.

While studying at the School of Painting, Sculpture and Architecture of the Moscow Art Society, Edel created a design for a Lutheran prayer house, school and parsonage, and in 1886 he drew up an original design for the buildings of the Lutheran community in Baku. However, only a school and an Evangelical Lutheran Church were built according to his design. His professor was A. K. Savrasov. He graduated from college with a gold medal he received for the drawing "In the Bath". Due to the fact that Edel's uncle and father worked in Baku, shortly after graduating from college, in the late 1880s, Ivan Vasilyevich himself moved to this city.

=== Creative period ===
In 1888, Edel began teaching drawing at the Mariinsky Women's Gymnasium in Baku, as well as at the private institution of Mrs. Wald (where, however, he taught for a short time). In 1890, according to his project and at the expense of the Baku oil industrialist Musa Naghiyev, at the corner of the Birzhevaya Street (now Uzeyir Hajibeyov) and Krasnovodskaya Street (now S. Vurgun), was built a house designed in the Italian style, which housed the winter club of the Baku Public Assembly (in Soviet times – the Baku District Officer's House), transferred there from Velikoknyazhesky Avenue, from the house Lalaeva. In the same year, according to the project of Edel, a three-storey residential building was built at 3 Prachechnaya Street (now - Gogol Street)

In 1891, Edel began designing the stone chapel of St. Apostle Bartholomew at the Maiden Tower. A Russian-style church with a mirrored cross on the dome was built and consecrated on 14 September 1892. In 1930, the church was closed and remained abandoned until it was demolished.

In 1892, according to the project of Edel, the Spasso-Transfiguration church-school was built at the plant “S. M. Shibaev and K“ on the territory of the so-called White City. After Soviet invasion of Azerbaijan in 1920, the Shibaev plant was transformed into an oil refinery named after Stalin (then named after the XXII Congress of the CPSU). In the same 1920, in pursuance of the decree on the separation of the school from the church, the church was closed, and later there was a technical school in its premises. In 1893, according to the project of Edel, on 8 Bolshaya Morskaya Street, (now - Bulbul Avenue), a building was built and consecrated, which later housed the Baku provincial treasury. Today, this building houses the polyclinic number 1 named after A. A. Kyazimov.

Also in 1893, Johann Edel built houses for Musa Nagiyev overlooking the streets Bolshaya Morskaya, Molokanskaya (now Khagani), Krasnovodskaya (now Samed Vurgun) and Birzhevaya (now U. Hajibekov). In the Soviet times, one of these houses was the location of the Baku District Officers House. In 1896, on the Police Street (now - Yusif Mammadaliev Street), a house was built according to the project of Edel, now known as the "House with Griffins". In the same year, Edel built houses on 14 Prachechnaya Street (floors were added in 1954) and on 9 Prachechnaya Street for the oil industrialist Shamsi Asadullayev, including the Oil Baron's Palace.

In 1904, Edel continued the building the edifice of Baku branch of the Imperial Russian Technical Society, started by Joseph Goslavsky, who died in the same year.

In 1910, according to the project of Edel, his own two-storey house was built on Birzhevaya Street.

=== Public service & his final years ===
In 1894, Ivan Vasilyevich Edel entered the Baku Real School as teacher of drawing and calligraphy, while continuing to teach lessons at the Mariinsky Women's Gymnasium as well. In 1896, he left the Mariinsky Gymnasium and taught only at the Real School. In the same year, I. V. Edel was promoted to the rank of court councilor, in 1899 – to the rank of collegiate councilor, and in 1903 – to the rank of state councilor. In 1905, Edel was given an annual salary of 1250 rubles for his diligent and valuable service. Since that time, Edel built a few buildings, he was mainly teaching at the Baku Real School (currently the Azerbaijan State Economic University is located in the building of the school).

In 1907, he ran for the City Duma, but did not get the necessary votes. In 1908 he was elected in the Parent Committee of the Baku Real School.

After the October Revolution, Ivan Edel worked as an architect at Baksovet. He died on 14 February 1932 as his wife, children and grandchildren reported in the newspaper "Baku Worker".

== Personal life ==
Ivan Vasilievich Edel was married to Grazia Nikolaevna Spodavekia, Roman Catholic, daughter of the skipper Nikolai Emanuilovich Spodavekia. I. V. Edel had six children: Olga, Lydia, Nina, Julia, Natalia and Victor. All of them were born in Baku. The daughters studied at the educational institution of St. Nina. The eldest, Olga, married A. A. Truskovsky, during the civil war, a member of the Kuban Regional Government for Finance, his further fate is unknown; Lydia, married I.I. Roslavtsev, a senior adjutant of the headquarters of the 4th Caucasian Army Corps, he was shot in Baku in 1920, they had two sons: Yuri (shot in 1938) and Igor – an architect, worked in Kislovodsk; Julia married I. A. Ochinsky, he taught Russian language and literature at the institution of St. Nina, their son Vsevolod was an architect, author of many projects, worked in Sochi; Natalya married the engineer V. G. Ryabchinsky (shot in 1938); Nina worked in Zakgiprovod, got married and changed her last name to Alysheva. The only son Victor emigrated to France after the revolution.

On 13 April 1938, the widow of I. V. Edel, Grazia Nikolaevna (aunt of the composer A.E. Spadavekkia), died.

== The buildings ==
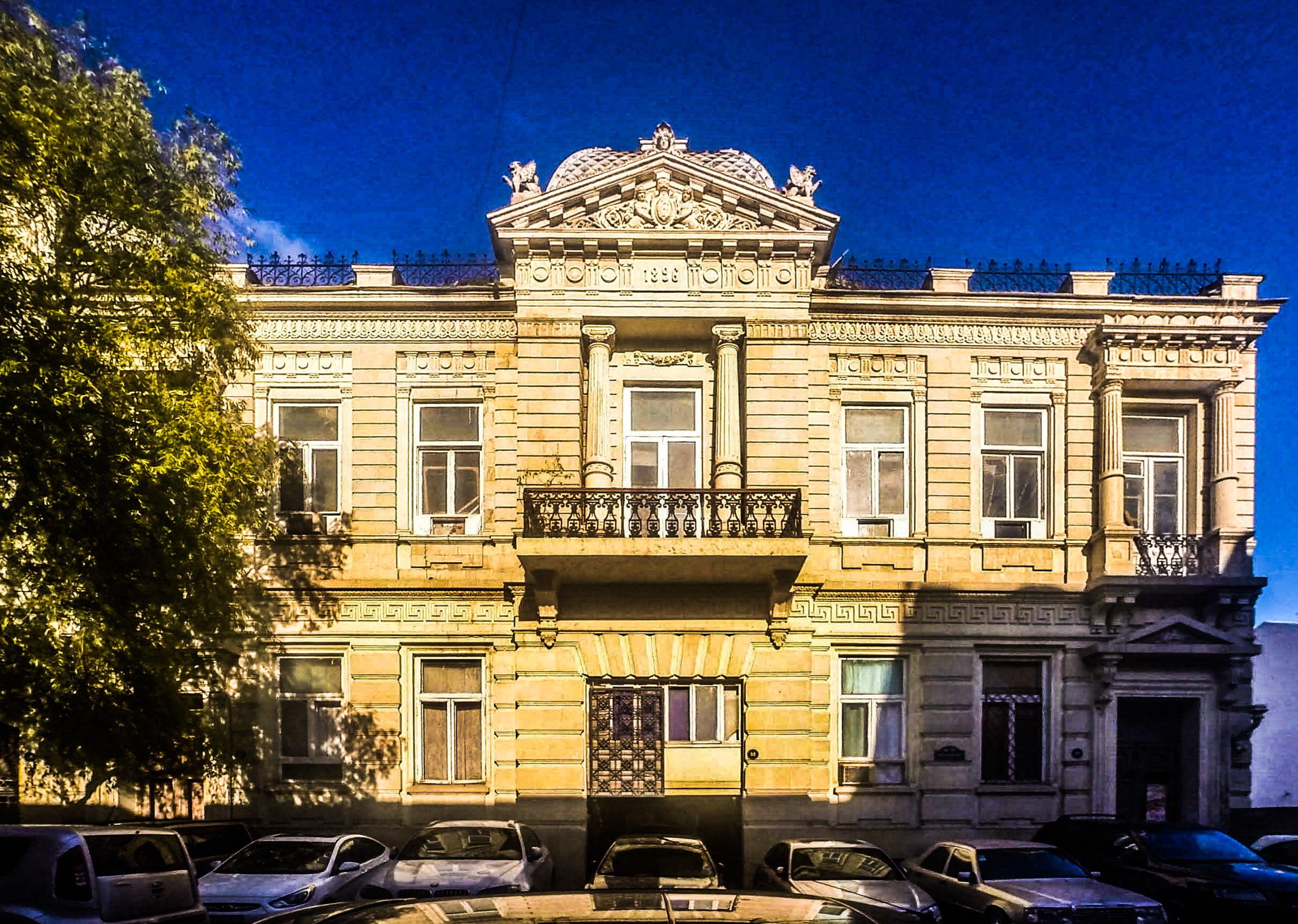
House with Griffins

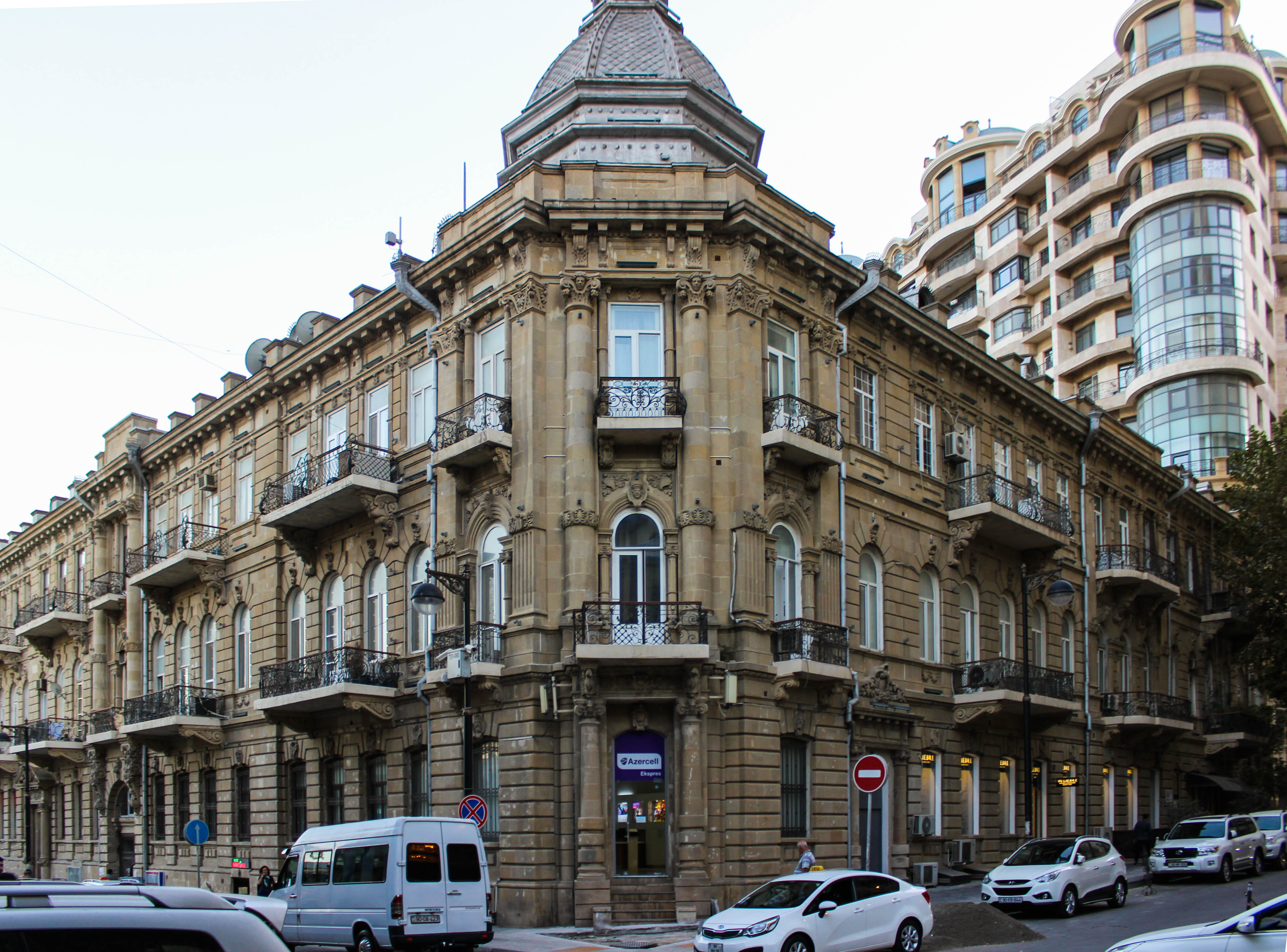
Mitrofanov's Residence

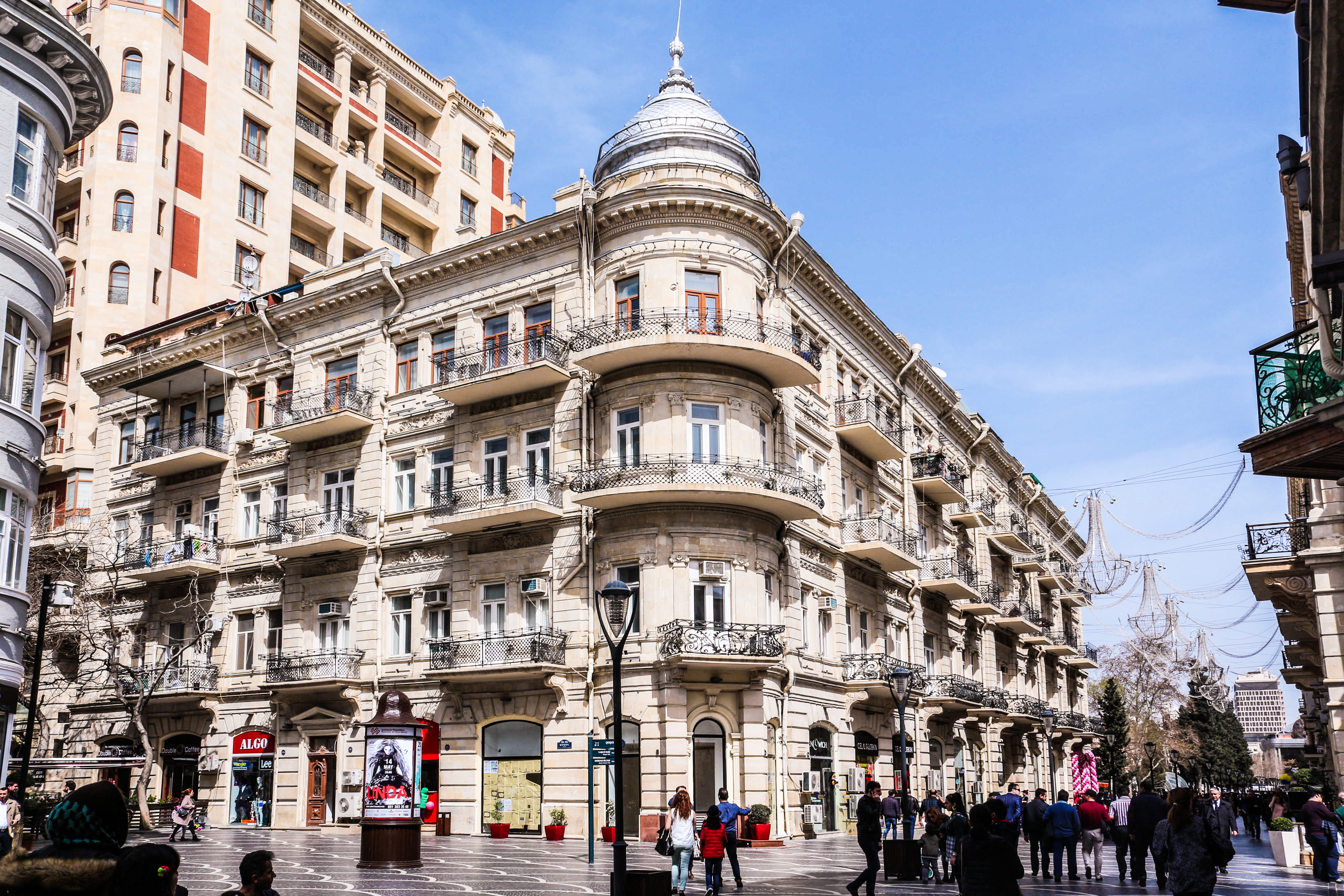
Murtuza Mukhtarov's house

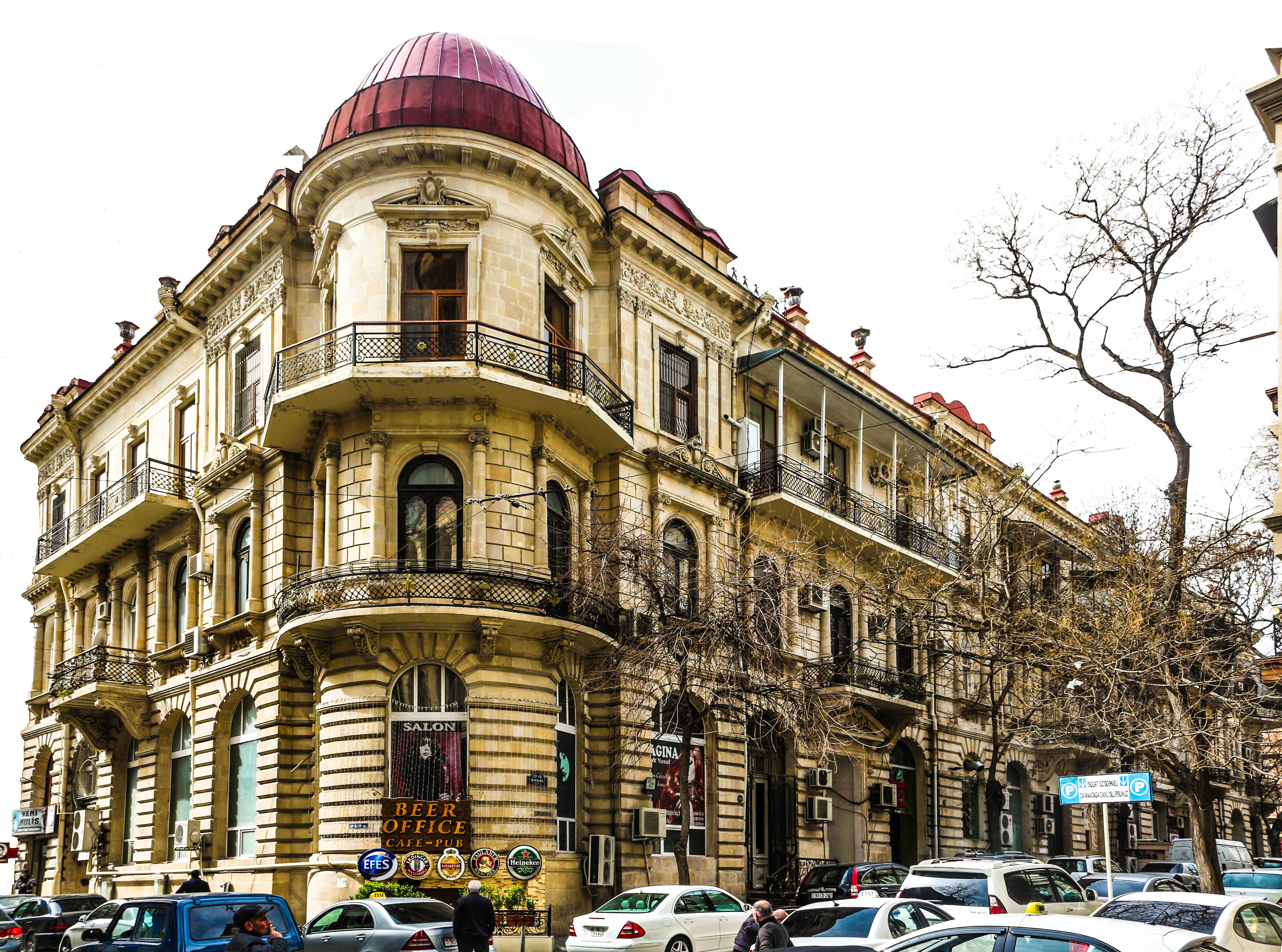
Asadullaev's Residence

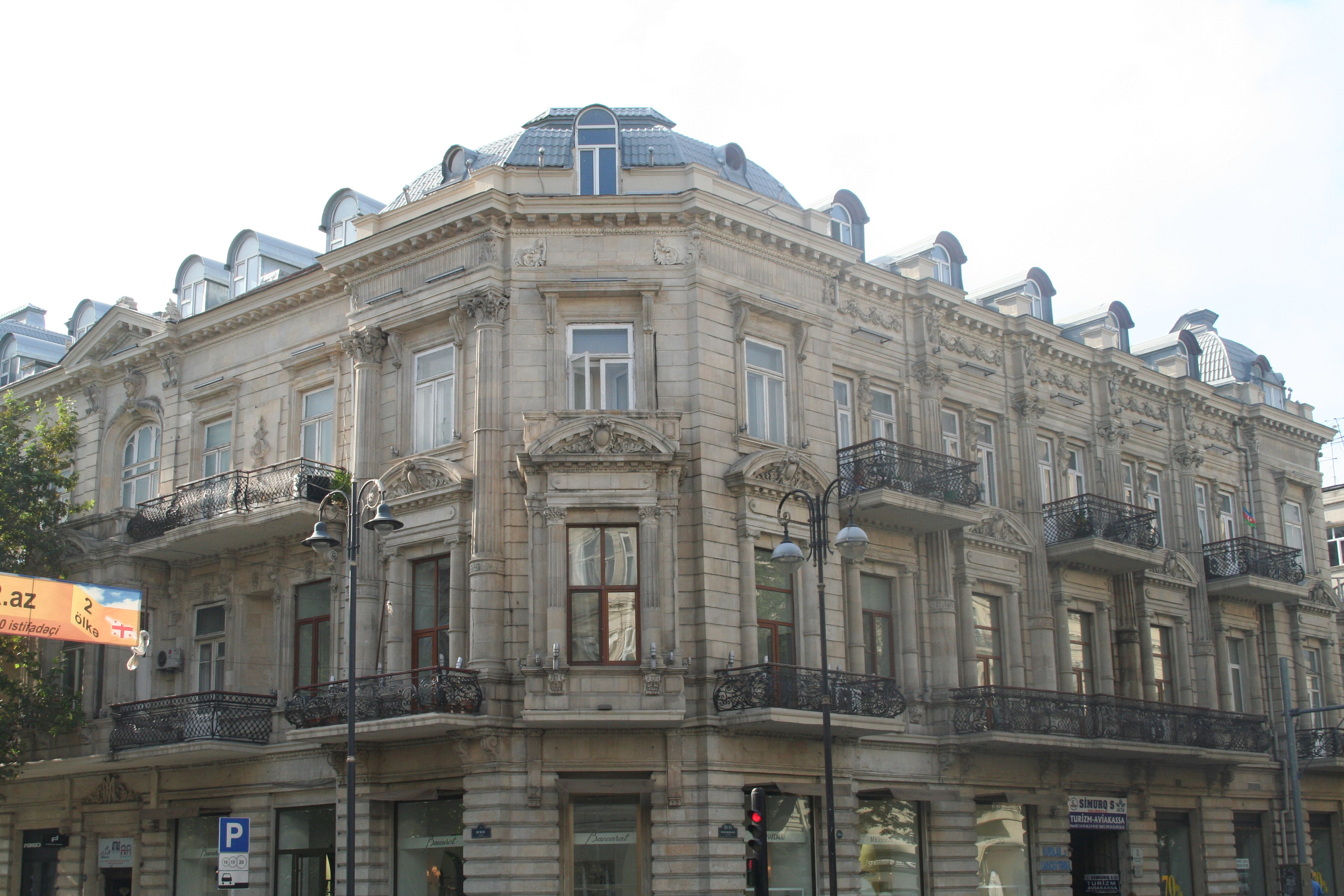
Three-storey residential building

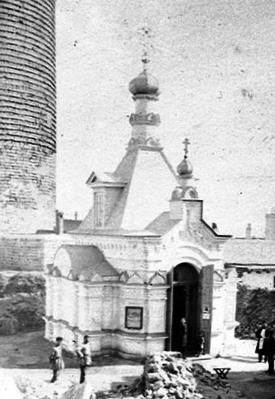
Saint Bartholomew Church

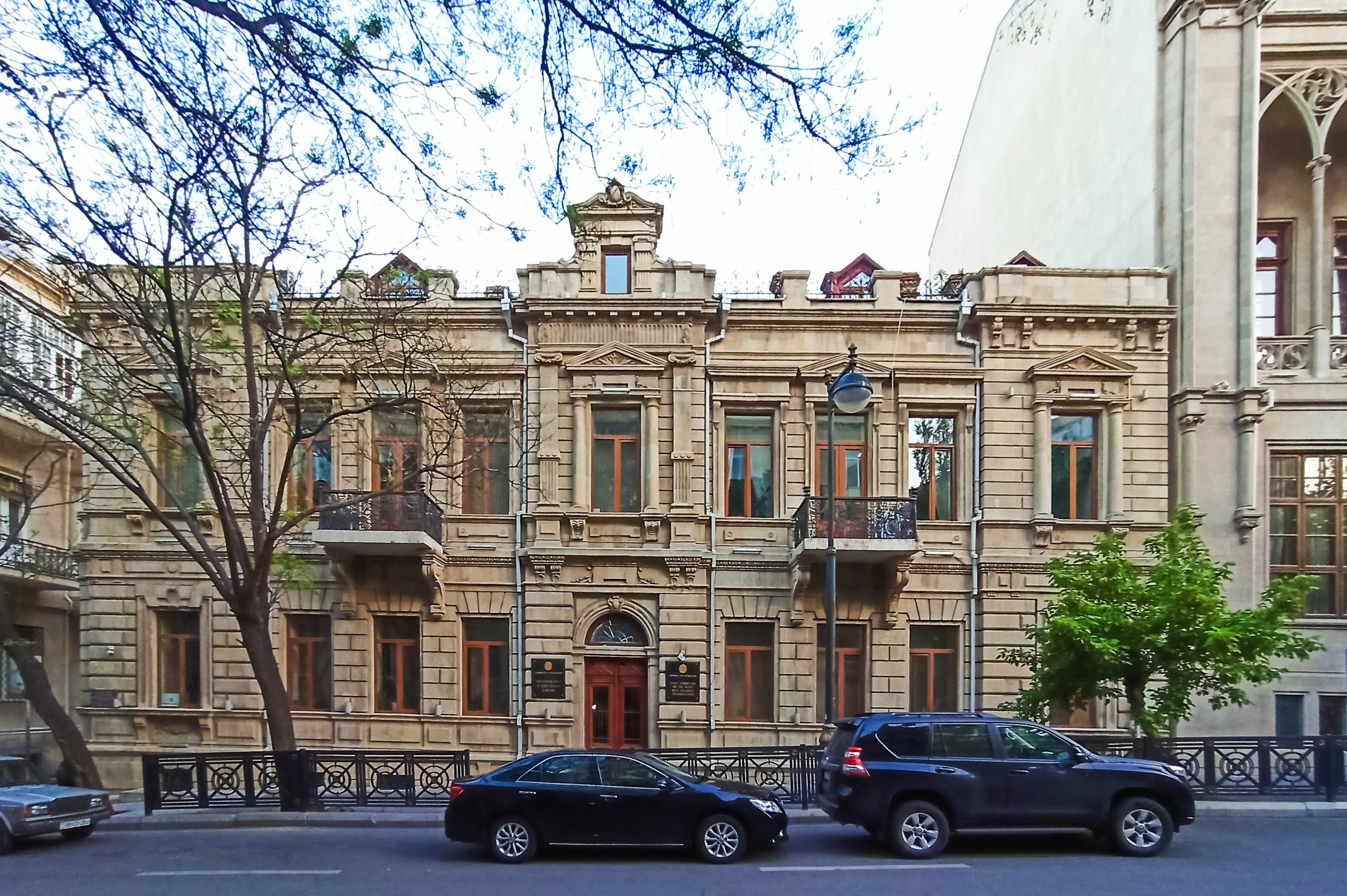
Hajinski's house

== See also ==
- Mikayil Huseynov
- Anton Kandinov
- Gasim bey Hajibababeyov
