= Banine =

French-Azerbaijani writer

Umm-El-Banine Assadoulaeff
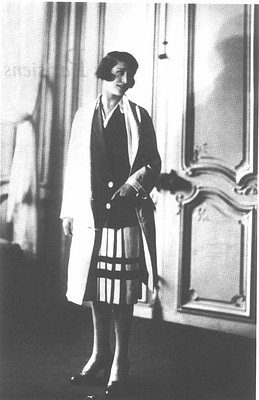
- Born: 18 December 1905; Baku, Russian Empire (now Azerbaijan)
- Died: 23 October 1992 (aged 86); Paris, France
- Occupation: Writer
- Writing career
- Pen name: Banine

Umm-El-Banine Assadoulaeff (Ummulbanu Asadullayeva; 18 December 1905 – 23 October 1992) was a French writer of Azerbaijani descent who wrote under the penname of Banine.

== Biography ==
She was a granddaughter of Azerbaijani millionaire Shamsi Asadullayev and daughter of Azerbaijani businessman and politician Mirza Asadullayev.

Banine emigrated to France in 1923 following her father, a former minister in the government of the Azerbaijan Democratic Republic (December 1918-April 1920). She moved to Istanbul where she abandoned her husband whom she had been forced to marry at the age of fifteen and then fled to Paris. There, after many years, literary acquaintances, including Henry de Montherlant, Nikos Kazantzakis, and André Malraux urged her to publish. Banine dedicated her later life to introducing the history and culture of Azerbaijan to France and Europe. Her most famous writings are Days in the Caucasus and Parisian Days.

Banine, who was the friend of the German writer Ernst Jünger and Russian Ivan Bunin, tells about her conversion to Catholicism in her books.

Banine published several articles about the situation in Azerbaijan. She died in October 1992. Her obituary in the newspaper Le Figaro called her "one of those personages of La vie romanesque who traverse a century, attracting like a lodestone all the singular figures of their times".

== Major works ==
- Nami (Nami), Gallimard, 1942.
- Days in the Caucasus (Jours caucasiens), Julliard, 1946.
- Parisian Days (Jours parisiens), Julliard, 1947, Gris Banal, 2003.
- Meetings with Ernst Jünger (Rencontres avec Ernst Jünger), Julliard, 1951.
- I chose opium (J'ai choisi l'opium), Stock, 1959.
- After (Après), Stock, 1962.
- Foreign France (La France étrangère), S.O.S Desclée de Brouwer, 1968.
- The call of the last chance (L'appel de la dernière chance), S.O.S, 1971.
- Portrait of Ernst Jünger: letters, texts, meetings (Portrait d'Ernst Jünger : lettres, textes, rencontres), La Table Ronde, 1971.
- Ernst Jünger multiple faces (Ernst Jünger aux faces multiples), Lausanne, éditions L'Âge d'Homme, 1989.
- What Mary told me: the tale of Mary's servant (Ce que Marie m’a raconté : le dit de la Servante de Marie), Cahier Bleus, 1991.
