= Mirza Asadullayev =

Azerbaijani politician (1875–1936)

Mirza Asadullayev Mirzə Əsədullayev
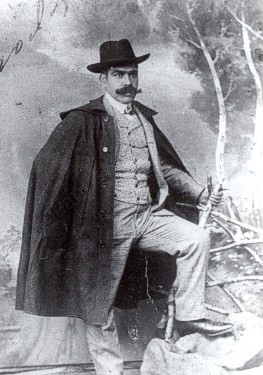

Minister of Industry and Trade of Azerbaijan Democratic Republic (ADR)
- In office 26 December 1918 – 14 March 1919
- President: Fatali Khan Khoyski Prime Minister, (Chairman of Azerbaijani Parliament)
- Preceded by: Agha Ashurov
- Succeeded by: Agha Aminov

Personal details
- Born: 1875 Baku, Azerbaijan
- Died: 1938 (aged 62–63) Paris, France

Mirza Asadullayev Shamsi oghlu (Azerbaijani: Mirzə Əsədullayev Şəmsi oğlu; 1875–1938) was an Azerbaijani industrial magnate, philanthropist and statesman who served as Minister of Industry and Trade in the third cabinet of Azerbaijan Democratic Republic, and was member of Parliament of Azerbaijan.

== Early years ==
Asadullayev was born in 1875 in Baku, Azerbaijan to the family of famous oil magnate Shamsi Asadullayev. After graduating from a Baku gymnasium, he worked for his father's oil company. In early 1900s, he married Umm-el-Banine, the daughter of another oil magnate Musa Nagiyev. With Umm-el-Banine, who died in childbirth, he was the father of French writer Banine. Due to his father's oil business, Asadullayev has spent considerable time living in Moscow and St. Petersburg. He also chaired the Muslim Charity Society organization. After the February revolution in Russia, Asadullayev was elected a member to the Executive Committee of the Interim Muslim National Council. In 1918, he was elected chairman of Baku Oil Industry Council.

== Political career ==
After establishment of Azerbaijan Democratic Republic, he played an important role in the economy of the country. On December 26, when the third cabinet led by Fatali Khan Khoyski was formed, Asadullayev was appointed the Minister of Industry and Trade of ADR. He's recognized as an important contributor in development of industry sector of Azerbaijan. After Bolshevik occupation of Azerbaijan in 1920, Asadullayev was arrested and imprisoned. He was released the same year and with permission from the authorities, was allowed to leave the country.

Asadullayev settled in Paris where he lived until his death in 1938.

== Family ==
He was married twice. His first wife was Umm el-Banu Nagieva, the daughter of the Baku millionaire oil industrialist Aga Musa Nagiev; she died in 1905. His second wife was Tamara Datieva (1892–1965), the daughter of engineer and State Councillor Beybulat Datiev. Four daughters were born from the first marriage — Kyovsər, Suraya, Kyubra (1901–1985), and Umm el-Banu (1905–1992), a writer better known under the pen name Banin. From the second marriage, a son was born — Shamsi (1915–1982).

== See also ==
- Azerbaijani National Council
- Cabinets of Azerbaijan Democratic Republic (1918-1920)
- Current Cabinet of Azerbaijan Republic
