= Sabunchi =

- Location within Armenia
- Coordinates: 39°59′59″N 44°28′00″E
- Country: Armenia
- Marz (Province): Ararat
- Time zone: UTC+4 ( )
  - Summer (DST): UTC+5 ( )

Sabunchi is a town in the Ararat Province of Armenia.
