= Shamsi Asadullayev =

Azerbaijani businessman and philanthropist (1840–1913)

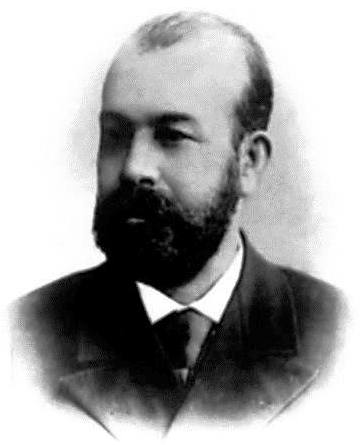
- Born: 1840; Baku, Azerbaijan
- Died: 1913 (aged 72–73); Yalta, Russia
- Children: Mirza Asadullayev, Ali Asadullayev, Sara Asadullayeva, Khadija Asadullayeva, Aghabaji Asadullayeva

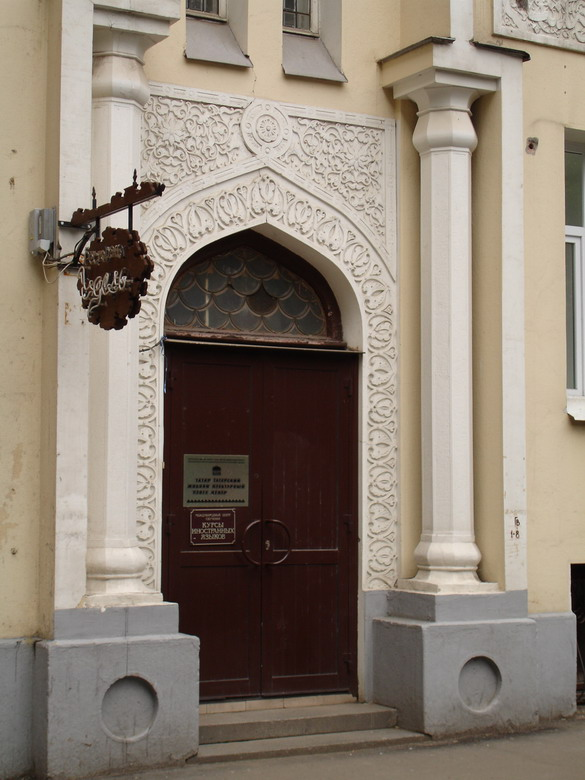
Entrance to Asadullayev mansion in Moscow

Shamsi Asadullayev (Azerbaijani: Şəmsi Əsədullayev; 1840 – 1913) was an Azerbaijani oil baron and philanthropist. He was the first businessman to use barges as transportation means to export oil out of Baku.

== Early years ==
Asadullayev was born in Amirjan village of Baku in 1840. At his early ages, he helped his father in farming business. In the mid 19th century, when the oil business started booming, vast territories around Amirjan and Surakhani, on which farmers worked, were bought by Russian businessmen Vasily Kokorev and Peter Gubonin with the purpose of building oil refineries. Remaining with no arable land, many farmers were forced to find work in the oil businesses. Shamsi Asadullayev started working at the refinery. In 1860, he was promoted to Deputy Director to Kokorev. Some time later, he became the subcontractor for oil and salt producers. In 1875, after earning sizable income, he opened a kerosene plant. In 1890, Asadullayev co-founded an oil company with several other producers. In 1891, he purchased three barges to export oil out of Baku to Russia via Caspian Sea. Asadullayev reportedly owned an electricity substation as well.

== Later years ==
In early 1890s, he purchased oil rich areas in the outskirts of Baku. In 1895, there was an oil gusher in one of newly acquired territories of Asadullayev which lasted for 56 days. As his oil exports to Russia through Volga River increased, he opened oil refineries in cities located in the export route basin, among them Moscow, Poland, Central Asia, Iran. As his wealth increased, Shamsi Asadullayev made contributions into building the Azerbaijani navy. He also funded construction of mansions in the center of Baku.

Asadullayev became an independent oilman, the owner of his own company in 1893. By 1910, Asadullayev had 37 oil wells, of which 17 produced oil uninterruptedly and in ever-increasing volumes. After the appearance of the Nobel Zoroaster in the Caspian Sea - the first oil tanker in the world - Asadullayev launches three oil tankers - the so-called three “A”: Asia, Africa, America.

Asadullayev was married to an Azerbaijani wife. The couple had five children: Mirza, Ali, Sara, Khadija and Aghabaji. When he married a Russian woman, his children broke off the relationship with their father and he had to move to Moscow in 1903. His Russian wife Marie Goudime-Levkovitch (Moscow, january 26th 1878- ) was the daughter of member of Duma, mother named Prascovie Nicolaieff and father Pierre Lebedeff, having close ties to the Russian tsar.

He died from sun stroke on 21 April 1913 in Yalta, government of Tauride, Russia.

== Asadullayev’s houses ==
=== Mansion in Baku ===
In 1896, a three-story mansion was built by architect Johann Edel at the request of Asadullayev at the corner of streets Prachechnaya 9, Gymnasia 183 and Karantinnaya 84 in Baku.

=== House in Moscow ===
Asadullayev bought two neighboring possessions in the area of Tatarskaya Sloboda, under No. 333 (Maly Tatarsky Pereulok, house 6) and No. 334 (ibid, house 8); the first section was intended for the construction of a large store (due to the death of Asadullayev, the project was not implemented), and on the land of the second ownership he decided to build a large building for the school.

A four-storey house, which became the cultural center of Moscow Muslims was built on this site in 1913 financed by Asadullayev. Before the 1917 revolution, the overwhelming majority of Muslims in Moscow were native Muscovites, among whom the Tatars numerically dominated. Therefore, the house of Asadullaev was originally used only by the Tatar community. The house included: the school of the Moscow Muslim Charitable Society, its reading room, and after the February Revolution of 1917, it also became one of the socio-political centers of the Muslims of Russia.

The House of Asadullayev served as a national cultural center for Moscow Muslims until 1941. In 1926 two Muslim orphanages (the heads of Timerbulatov and Khabibullin); school number 27 named after Narimanov with 210 students in seven groups (headed by Yusupov); Tatar Central Club. Yamasheva; central library of Turkic peoples were located there.

In 2003, this building was returned to the Tatar national-cultural autonomy of Moscow.

== Patronage ==
Shamsi Asadullayev is known as a philanthropist. He allocated funds for the construction of the Baku Real School building (now Azerbaijan State Economic University); established two scholarships of his own name at the Alexander Tiflis Teacher Training Institute, the largest in the Caucasus; presented one of his mansions in Zamoskvorechye to the Moscow Muslim community (House Asadullayev). He paid for studies of several dozen talented young Azerbaijanis in Germany, France, Warsaw, Kazan, Kiev, Moscow, Odessa, St. Petersburg and Kharkov (for example, in 1901, the first Azerbaijani graduated from the St. Petersburg Institute of Civil Engineers architect Ziver Bey Akhmedbekov, who became the author of many architectural monuments Baku).

In 1908-1912, mining in the fields of Asadullayev ranged from 6 to 8 million pounds per annum (architectural monuments of Baku).
