= Khagani Alley (Baku) =

Road in Baku, Azerbaijan

Coordinates: 40.375°N 49.850°E

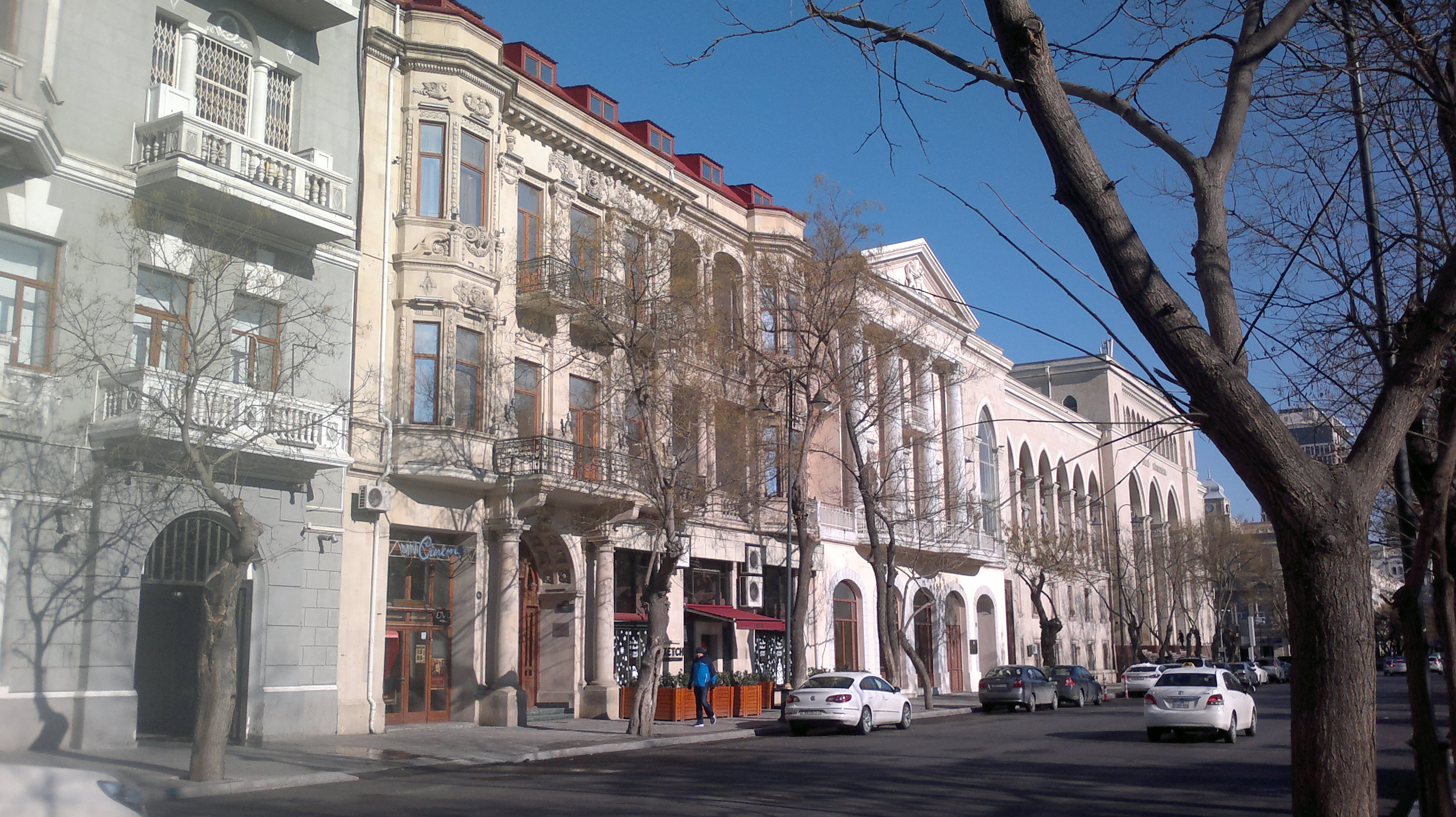
- Interactive map of Khagani Alley
- Maintained by: City of Baku
- Length: 1.7 km (1.1 mi)
- Location: Sabail raion
- West end: Rasul Rza street
- East end: Kovkab Safaraliyeva Street

Khagani Alley (or Khagani Street) is a road from Rasul Rza Alley to Kovkab Khanim Safaraliyeva Alley. There are many historical monuments of the 16th to 20th centuries on the street, as well as a statue and three parks. The road is 1.7 kilometres (1.1 mi) in length.

== History ==
Construction of this alley began in the early 1880s. The alley was named Malakanskaya after the Molokane who first came here and settled there. Khagani Garden, where the street begins, was once called the Molokan Garden. The alley starts from Molokan Park or Marinsky Park and extends to the east of the area, which was an industrial zone of the city at that time. Capital-style buildings were built on the alley in the XIX-XX centuries. Since the classical principles were not included in the design structure of the buildings in the early days, the houses No. 1,3,5 built on the alley were built in a free style of architecture. Later, with the arrival of architects trained in architecture, more interesting compositions appeared in the construction of facades and interiors. Architects Anton Kandinov and Yuzef Ploshko made a great contribution to the architecture of the alley. The building of the Union of Artists of Azerbaijan, the building of the Union of Composers of Azerbaijan, the building of the Azerbaijan State Academic Russian Drama Theater named after Samad Vurgun, the four-storey entrance house of Musa Nagiyev, the building of the Azerbaijan National Library, and other important historical buildings are located on the alley. After the April occupation, the alley was renamed January 9, 1929.

Since 1946, the street has been named Khagani Alley in honor of the prominent representative of classical Azerbaijani literature, poet-philosopher Khagani Shirvani.

== Historical and architectural monuments ==
No.	Building	Address	Brief Description	Photo
1	Residential house (Khagani alley, 1)	Khagani alley, 1	Khagani alley 1 Residential house built in 1890. Later, the building was demolished and the Khagani shopping center was built in its place.	
2	Residential house (Khagani alley, 5)	Khagani alley, 5	Residential building built in 1886.	
3	Mikado Cinematography building	Khagani alley, 7	Mikado Cinema Building Khagani alley 7 The building of the Mikado Cinematography or the building of the Azerbaijan State Academic Russian Drama Theater named after Samad Vurgun was renovated in 1916 by Aliheydar Karimov and used as a warehouse in the Chinese-Japanese style. In 1917, for the first time in Baku, a scientific-educational cinematographic session was held for high school students in this theater. The Pel Mel Theater, the Baku Free Criticism and Propaganda Theater, and the Baku Workers' Theater functioned in the building at different times. The Azerbaijan State Academic Russian Drama Theater named after Samad Vurgun has been operating in the building since 1937.	
4	Residential house (Khagani alley, 9)	Khagani alley, 9	The architect of the building, built in 1896 at 9 Khagani alley, is Ivan Vasilievich Edel. The building was built in the Italian Renaissance style. The building, which served as the Iraqi embassy for some time after independence, is currently unused.	
5	House of Musa Nagiyev	Khagani alley, 14	The building was built in 1910 by the order of Musa Nagiyev. Ploshko used the classical style and order system style direction of the style. Large pilasters of ionic columns connected the risalites in the corner and the central part in the form of a portico for two floors. The rhythm of the window openings with alternating curved and rectangular sanders, expensive frames determines the volume plasticity of the facade, which is distinguished by a proportional distribution of traction between the floors and a successfully increased cornice. Renaissance balcony railings on the facade attract special attention and actively participate in the formation of the artistic image of the house.	
6	Residential house (Khagani alley, 18)	Khagani alley, 18	Residential building built in 1884 by Anton Kandinov.	
7	The building of the Union of Artists of Azerbaijan	Khagani alley, 19	The building of the Union of Composers of Azerbaijan.	
8	Residential house (Khagani alley, 23)	Khagani alley, 23	A five-story residential building built in 1911.	
9	The building of the Azerbaijan Writers' Union	Khagani alley, 25	A residential building built by Sarkisov in 1915.	
10	The building of the Union of Composers of Azerbaijan	Khagani alley, 27	A 3-storey residential building built by Sarkisov in the early twentieth century. This eclectic style building has housed the Union of Miners of Azerbaijan since 1922. Later, the building housed the Union of Composers of Azerbaijan.	
11	Musa Nagiyev's four-storey house	Khagani alley, 47	A four-storey house built in 1910–1912. It was built by the architect Józef Płoszko by the order of Aga Musa Nagiyev.	

== Parks and gardens ==
=== Khagani Garden ===
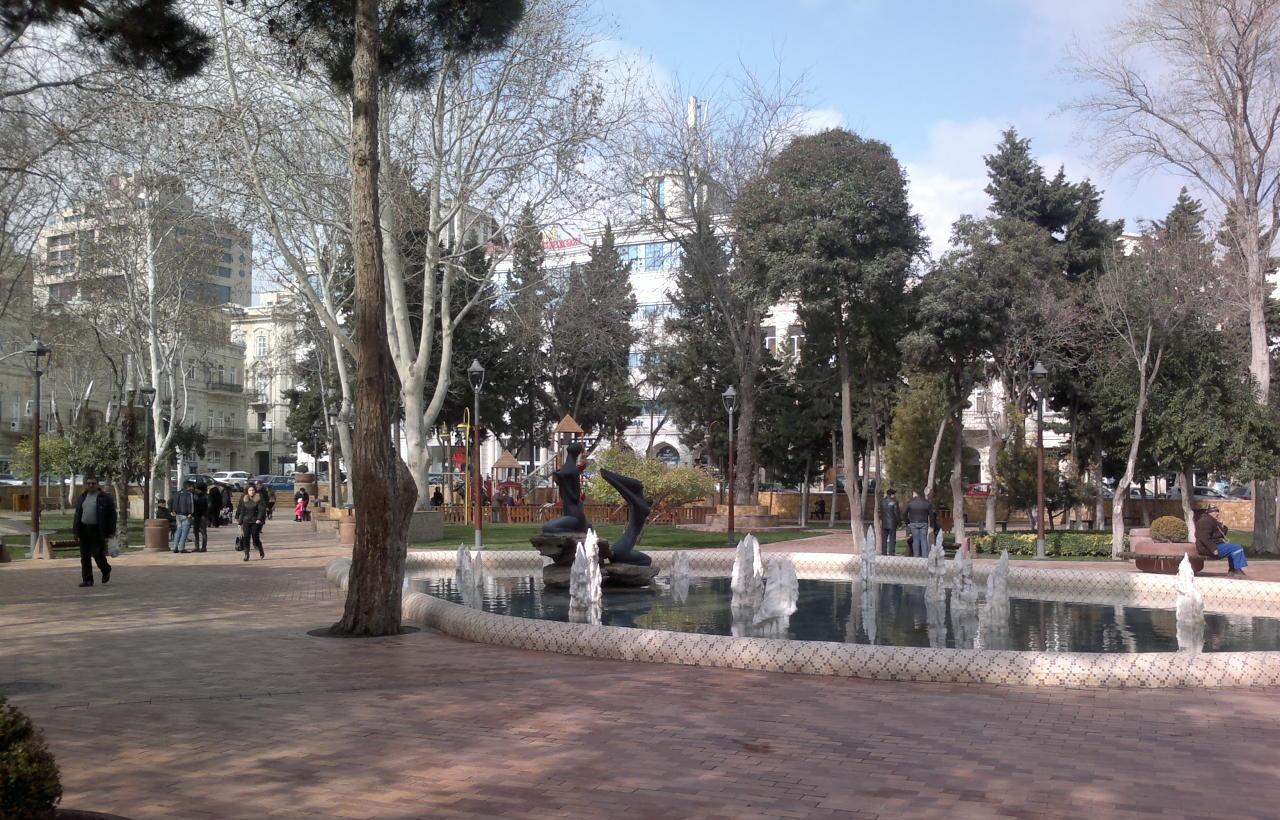
Khagani Garden

Khagani Garden one of the oldest parks in Baku with an area of 0.8 hectares. It is located in Sabail district. The park is named after the poet Khagani Shirvani, who lived in Shamakhi in the Middle Ages. The park is bounded on the south by Uzeyir Hajibeyov Street, on the north by Khagani Street, on the east by Gogol Street, and on the west by Rasul Riza Street. The basis of the architectural-landscape composition of the garden consists of a curved pool with a group of sculptures, "Three Beauties," consisting of statues of three girls. The group of sculptures is mounted on large pieces of ordinary stone.

=== Sahil Garden ===
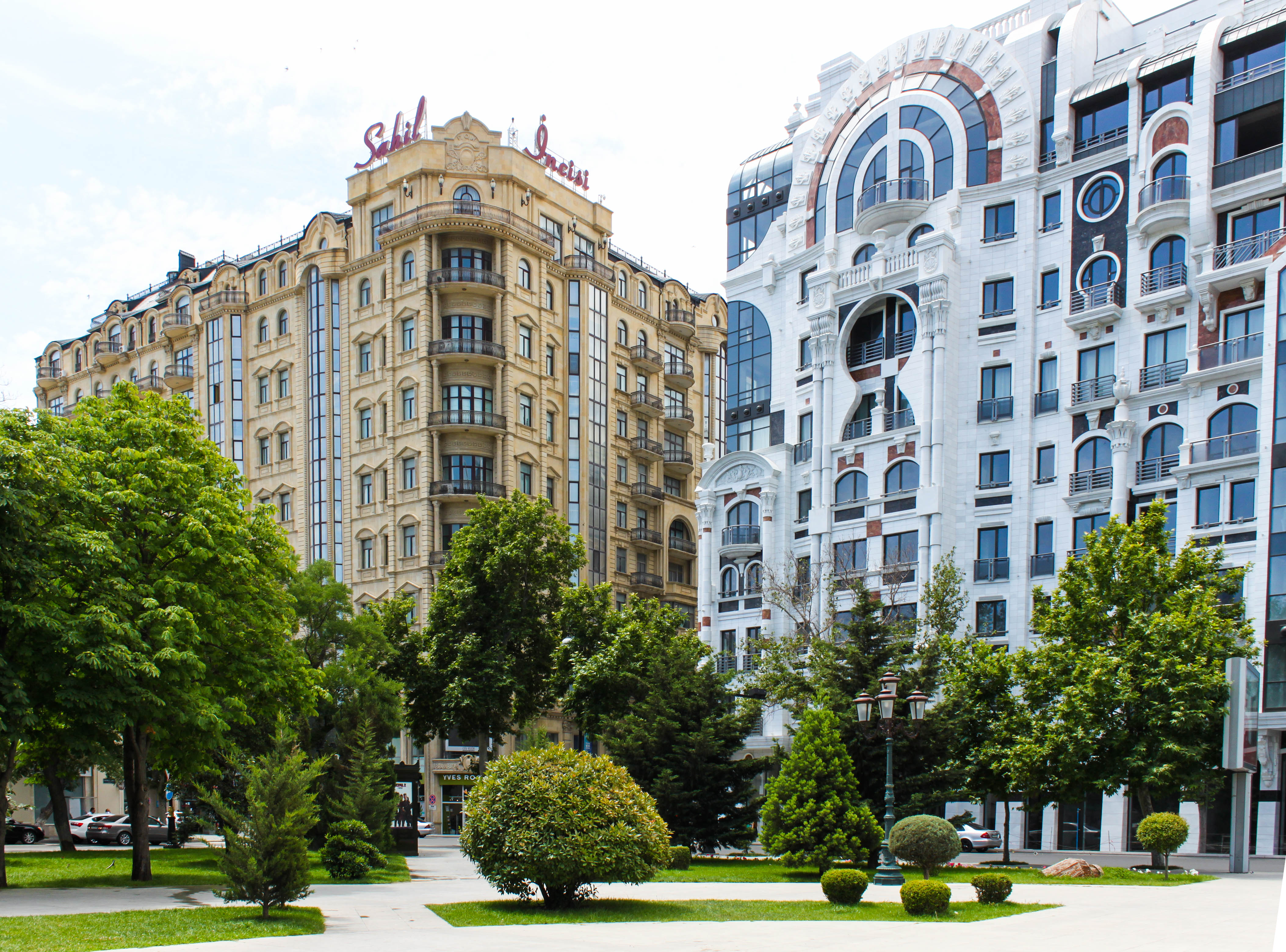
Sahil Garden

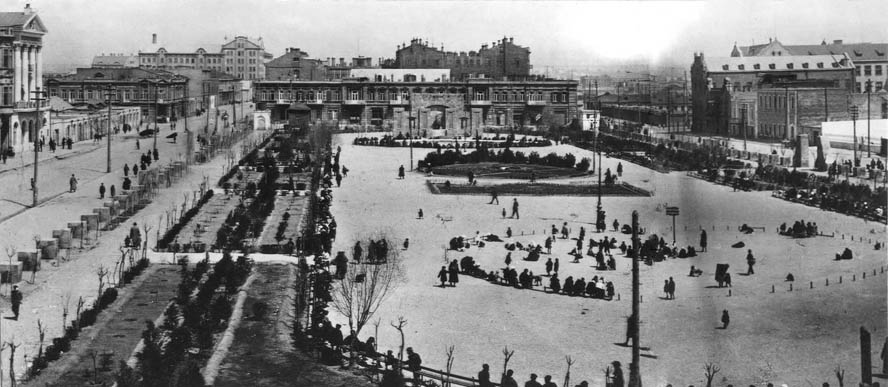
Sahil Garden in the 1930s

Located in the central part of Baku, at the intersection of Khagani Street, Bulbul Avenue, Uzeyir Hajibeyli and Rashid Behbudov Streets, in front of the National Library of Azerbaijan named after Mirza Fatali Akhundzade, the garden is surrounded by historical buildings. The first name of the garden was Birjevaya Square. After the establishment of the Azerbaijan Democratic Republic, it was renamed as Azadliq Square. After the April occupation, after 26 Baku commissars were buried here, a monument was erected in their memory and the garden was renamed. After independence, the monument of the commissars was removed from the park and renamed Sahil garden.

=== Fikret Amirov Park ===
In 2011, a statue of Azerbaijani composer, People's Artist of the USSR, laureate of the USSR State Prize, Hero of Socialist Labor, laureate of the State Prize of the Azerbaijan SSR Fikret Amirov was put on Khagani Street in Baku, and a new park was built. The sculptor of the statue is Namig Dadashov.
