= Khagani Garden =

Park in Baku, Azerbaijan

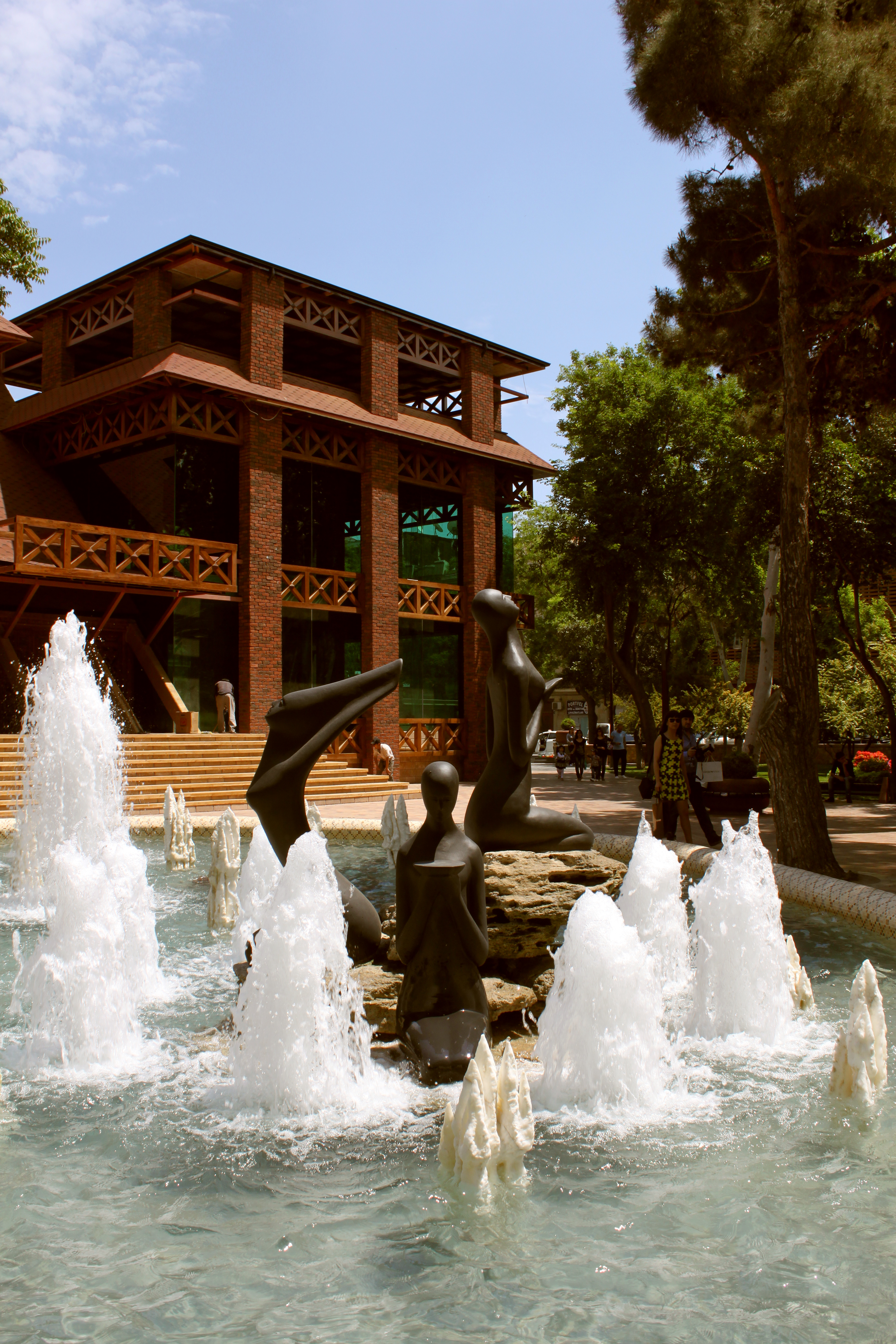
- Interactive map of Khagani Garden
- Location: Baku Azerbaijan
- Coordinates: 40°22′18″N 49°50′25″E

The Khagani Garden (Azerbaijani: Xaqani bağı), better known as the Molokan Garden (Azerbaijani: Molokan bağı) and malakanka, is one of the oldest parks in Baku, the capital of Azerbaijan. It is small in area (0.8 hectares), and is located in the Sabail district of the city. It bears the name of the medieval Persian poet Khagani Shirvani. On the south, the garden is bounded by Uzeyir Hajibeyov Street, on the north by Khagani Street, on the east by Gogol Street, and on the west by Rasul Rza Street.

== Description ==
The basis of the architectural and landscape composition of the garden is a curvilinear pool with a sculptural group "Three Graces", which consists of three sculptures of graceful girls. Large blocks of natural stone serve as a pedestal for them.

The columns of the garden pavilion start from the water pool. The gardens paths are traced in such a way that they cut diagonally through the space and pass next to the centrally located pool. Although the garden is very small in size (about 0.8 hectares), it is quite cozy and is a favorite rest spot for many Bakuvians. The green mass of the garden is arranged so that it creates large shady areas where benches are located to relax. Among trees, there are undergrowth of shrubs and flower beds.

== History ==
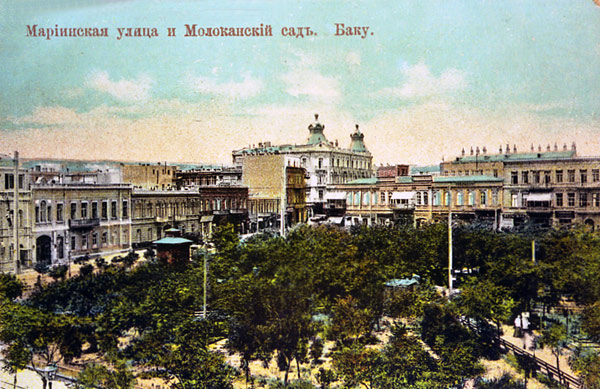
Molokan Garden on a postcard of the Russian Empire

In the second half of the 19th century, when the oil and related industries began to develop intensively, the residential areas already accounted for a significant percentage of the citywide development in the northeastern part of the Icheri Sheher fortress (the historical district of Baku). In the 1860s, the Molokan settlement arose in the suburb sphere of influence and served as a farmers' market (Russian: rinok). In connection with the development of the central quarters, the Molokan Slobodka with its courtyards and stables was demolished to the ground, and the Molokans were relocated to a completely new area of Zavokzalye, where a new Molokan carriage settlement was created. On the site of the settlement, the Mariinsky Square was laid out. The square was created in the early 1870s in the immediate vicinity of the rich residential areas. The square was located in one of the central districts of the city – Primorsky. The parks surrounding neighborhoods gave it a reserved character.

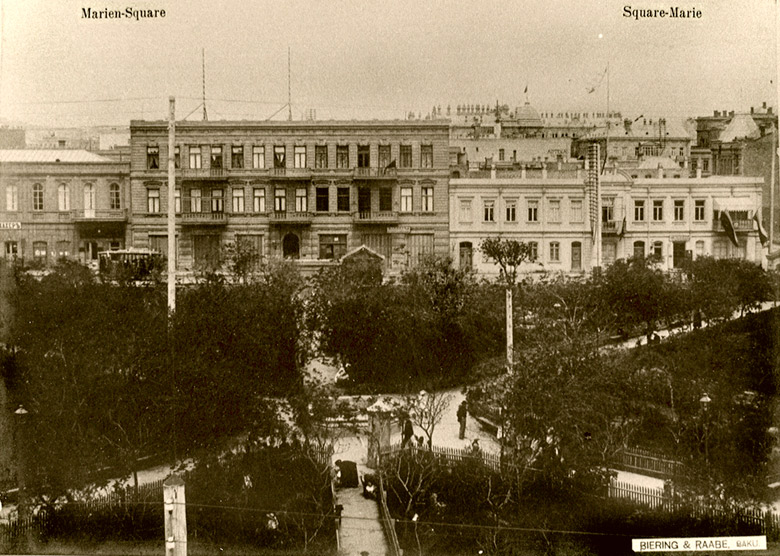
Mariinsky square in 1915

The creation and design of the park was accompanied by many difficulties, which primarily arose due to the poor water supply. Also, there was no attention to this square from the city gardener or the council. The following was reported in the "Kaspiy" newspaper.

Baku cannot boast of an abundance of greenery, and therefore such an indifferent attitude to the garden ... is more than criminal.

In the late 1890s, new trees were planted in accordance with the existing planning structure of the square. The plan of the park had a square shape. The composition of the plan was built on the basis of diagonally located alleys. In the center of the intersection of the alleys was a pool with a fountain. A number of trees were placed along the perimeter of the square, which made it possible to create an additional bypass alley and thereby increase the visual and functional qualities of the green area.

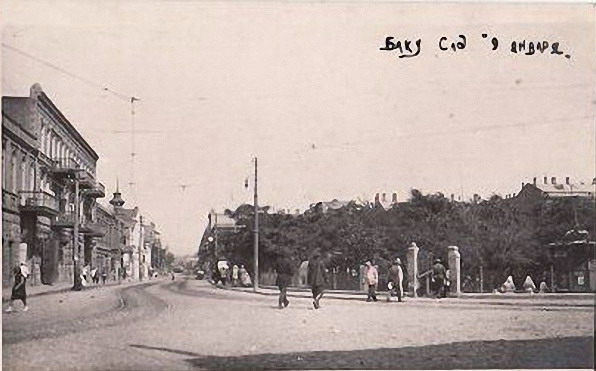
"9 January" garden on 1925

At the beginning of the 20th century, it became necessary to redevelop Mariinsky Square, since, as the chief gardener A. E. Vasiliev noted, "the city set itself the goal of arranging public gardens, and recently even the Riviere". In 1904, based on a study of the situation, Vasiliev drew up a project for the reconstruction of Mariinsky Square. The project envisaged the expansion of the alleys and the planting of trees resistant to the hot climate. To achieve greater artistic expressiveness, it was planned to replace the existing vegetation with trees with high decorative qualities. It was also supposed to be carefully interspersed with small architectural forms. However, this project was never implemented.

After the establishment of the Soviet power, the garden was renamed "The Garden of 9 January" (in the memory of the Bloody Sunday of 1905). After World War II, the garden was reconstructed to include small architectural forms – skylights, a newsstand, a house for pigeons and other elements of landscape design.

Later, the garden was named after Hashim Aliyev. After gaining independence, the garden was renamed in the honor of Khagani.
