= Mikado Cinematography building =

- Azerbaijani: Mikado sinematoqrafının binası
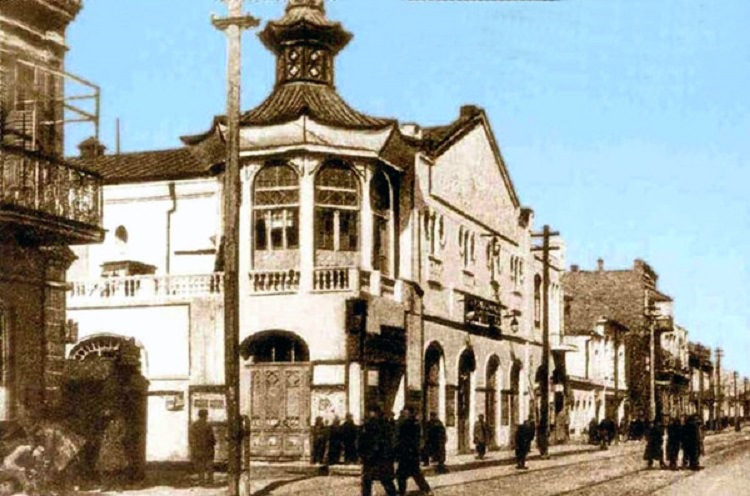
- Interactive map of the Mikado Cinematography building area

General information
- Location: Khagani Street 7, Sabail, Baku, Azerbaijan
- Coordinates: 40°22′20″N 49°50′26″E
- Completed: December 26, 1916
- Owner: Aliheydar Karimov

The Mikado Cinematography building or Azerbaijan State Academic Russian Drama Theater building named after Samad Vurgun - the building, previously used by Aliheydar Karimov as a warehouse in 1916, was renovated in the Chinese-Japanese style and began to function as a cinematographer. In 1917, for the first time in Baku, a scientific-educational cinematographic session was held for junior high school students in this theater. The Pel Mel Theater, the Baku Free Criticism and Propaganda Theater, and the Baku Workers' Theater functioned in the building at different times. The Azerbaijan State Academic Russian Drama Theater named after Samad Vurgun has been operating in the building since 1937.

== About ==
At the end of the 19th century, the millionaire Haji Hashim bey Karimov built a warehouse at Molokanskaya 7 (now Khagani Street) to store supplies. After traveling to China and Japan, Haji Hashim Bey's son Aliheydar Karimov returned to Baku and, influenced by the buildings he saw, built an oriental-style building on the site of the warehouse. On December 26, 1916, the Mikado Cinema opened in this building. In 1918–1920, during the Azerbaijan Democratic Republic, the club theater "Pelmel" operated in the building. Theater and music lovers from Russia and other nations, as well as foreign troupes, performed here.

After the April occupation, from 1920 to April 29th 1923, the Baku Free Critical and Propaganda Theater operated in the building. The main task of this theater was to carry out Bolshevik propaganda among the workers and the poor. Later, in 1923, the theater was renamed the Baku Workers' Theater. At the time, the theater troupe was complemented by actors from Odessa, Moscow and Irkutsk. By 1928, the oriental-style appearance of the building had been completely changed, and certain parts were added to it. However, after this reconstruction, the building became more like a factory or prison, which provoked protests from residents.

On January 24, 1937, by the decision of the Council of People's Commissars of the AzSSR, the name of the Baku Workers' Theater was changed to the Azerbaijan State Russian Drama Theater. The building was renovated in 1945 after the end of World War II. On June 11, 1956, the name of the theater was changed to the Azerbaijan State Academic Russian Drama Theater, named after Samad Vurgun. In the 1960s, it became clear that the building could not withstand this situation for a long time, so in 1962–1964, under the leadership of Ivan Sarkisov and Mrs. Rahmanova, the building was thoroughly reconstructed. Later, in the 1980s as well as in the 2000s, the building underwent some changes.

== Photos ==
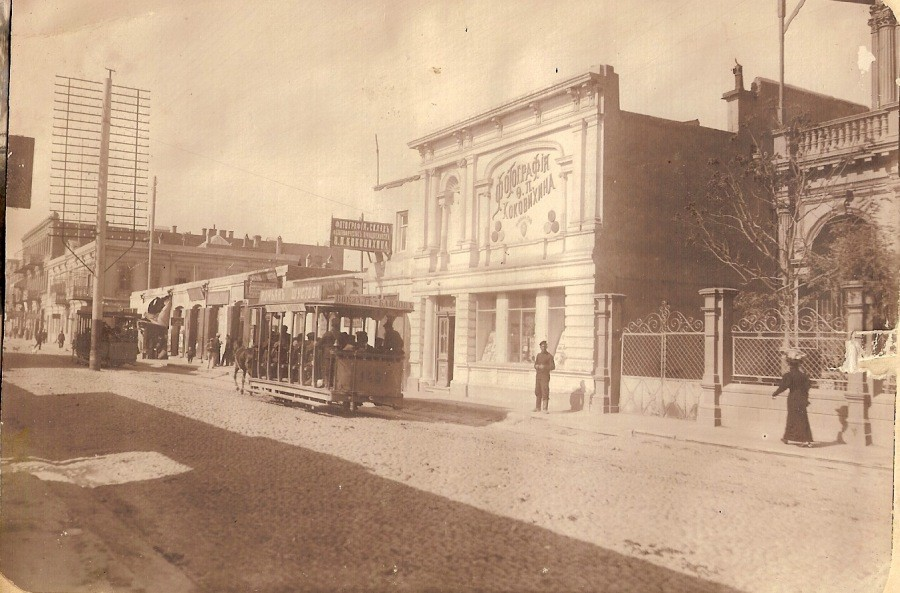
Warehouse that previously existed in the area

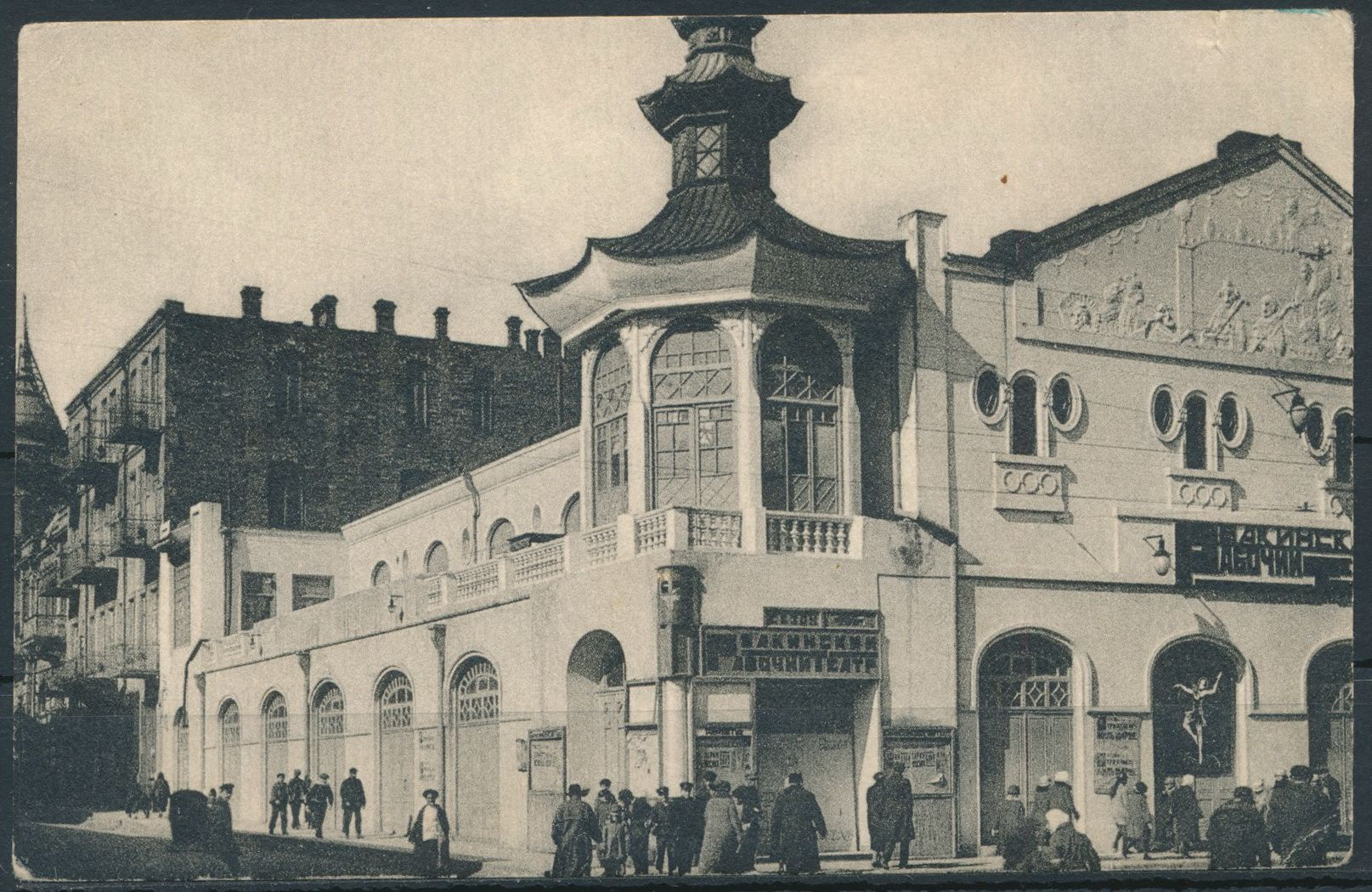
Baku Free Critical and Propaganda Theater 1920-1924

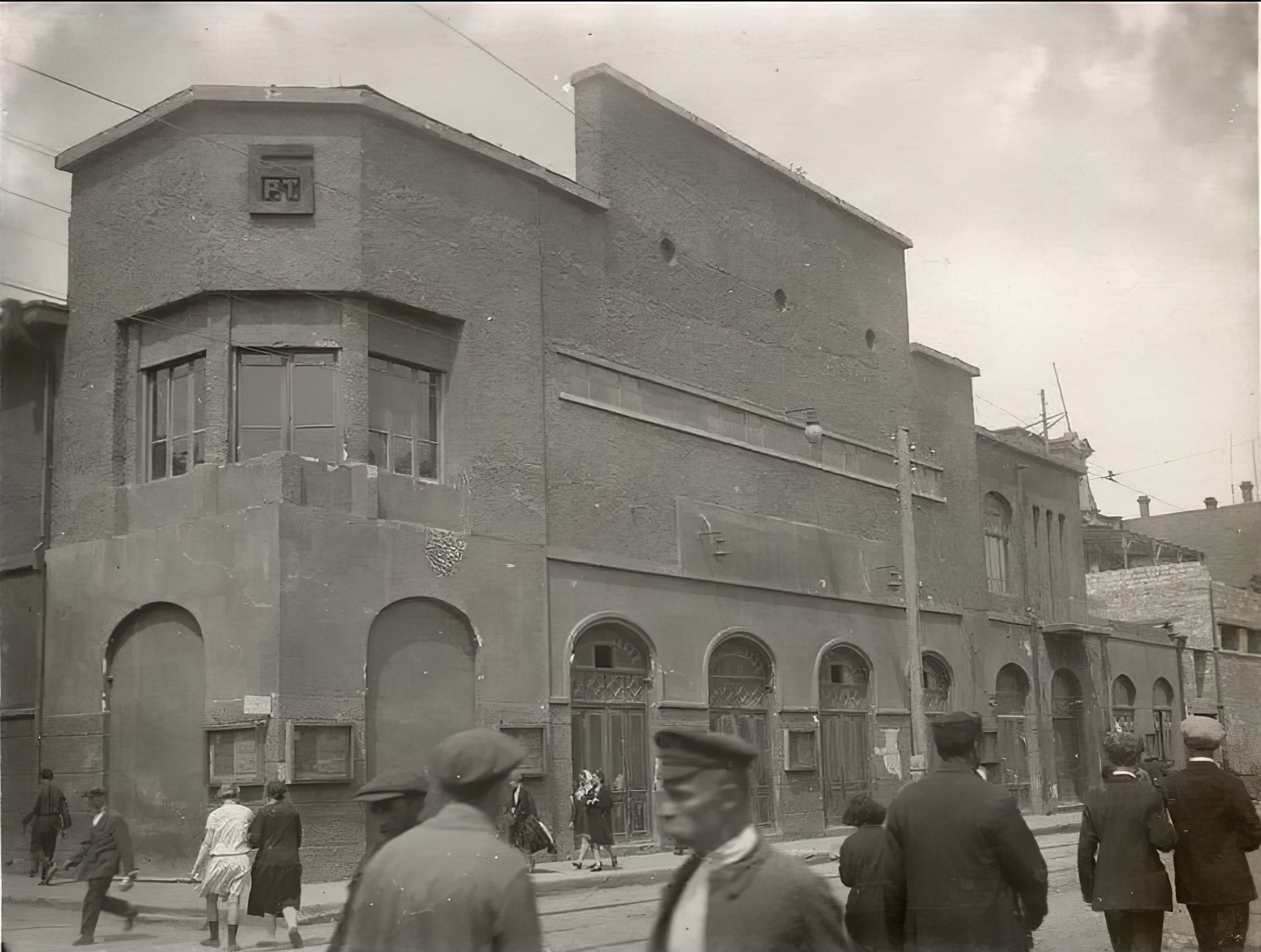
Baku Workers' Theater 1932

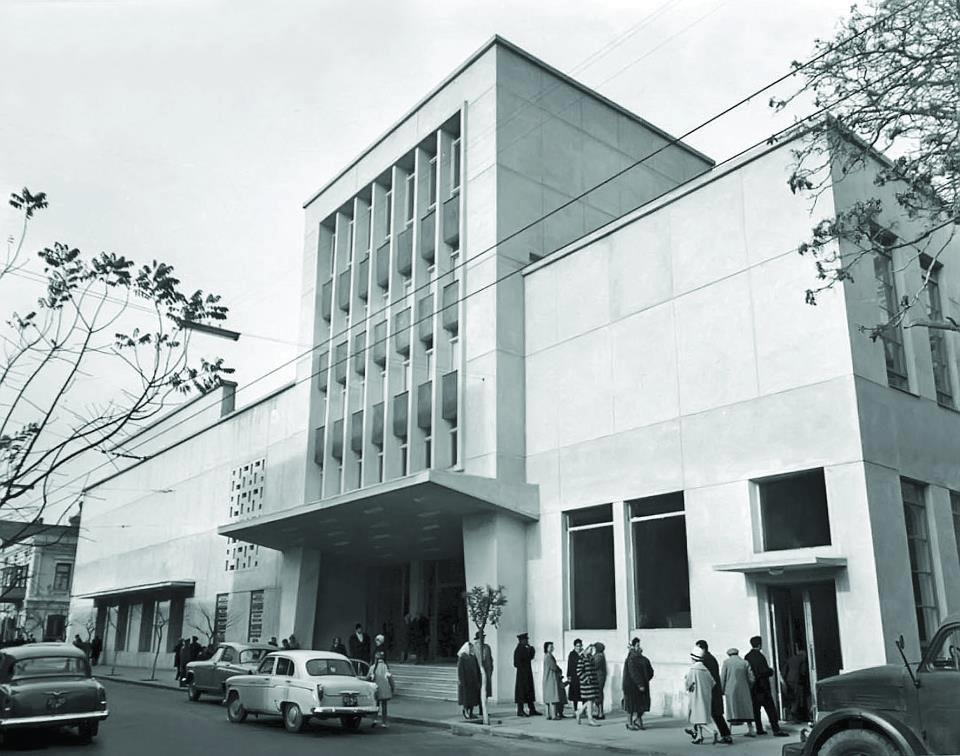
Azerbaijan State Academic Russian Drama Theater 1970s

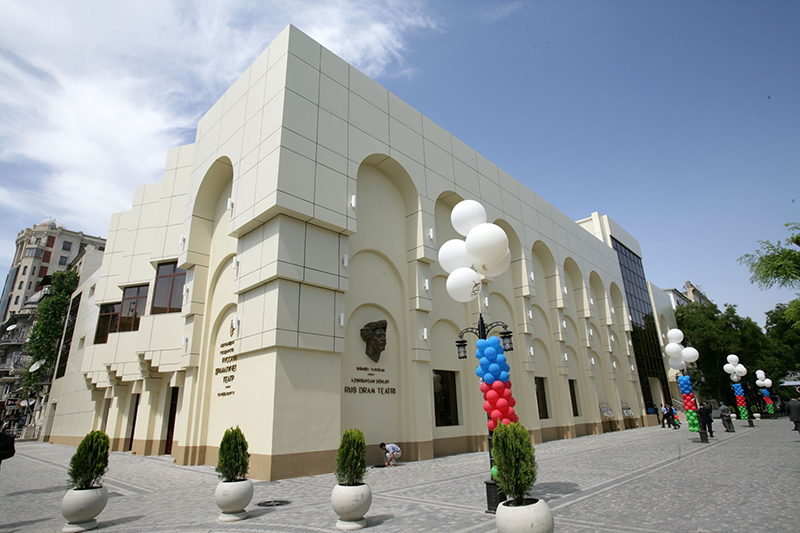
Azerbaijan State Academic Russian Drama Theater 2008

== See also ==
- Ismailiyya Palace
- Mitrofanov Residence
- Property of Haji Mustafa Rasulov
