= Union of Composers Building (Baku) =

- Azerbaijani: Azərbaycan Bəstəkarlar İttifaqının binası
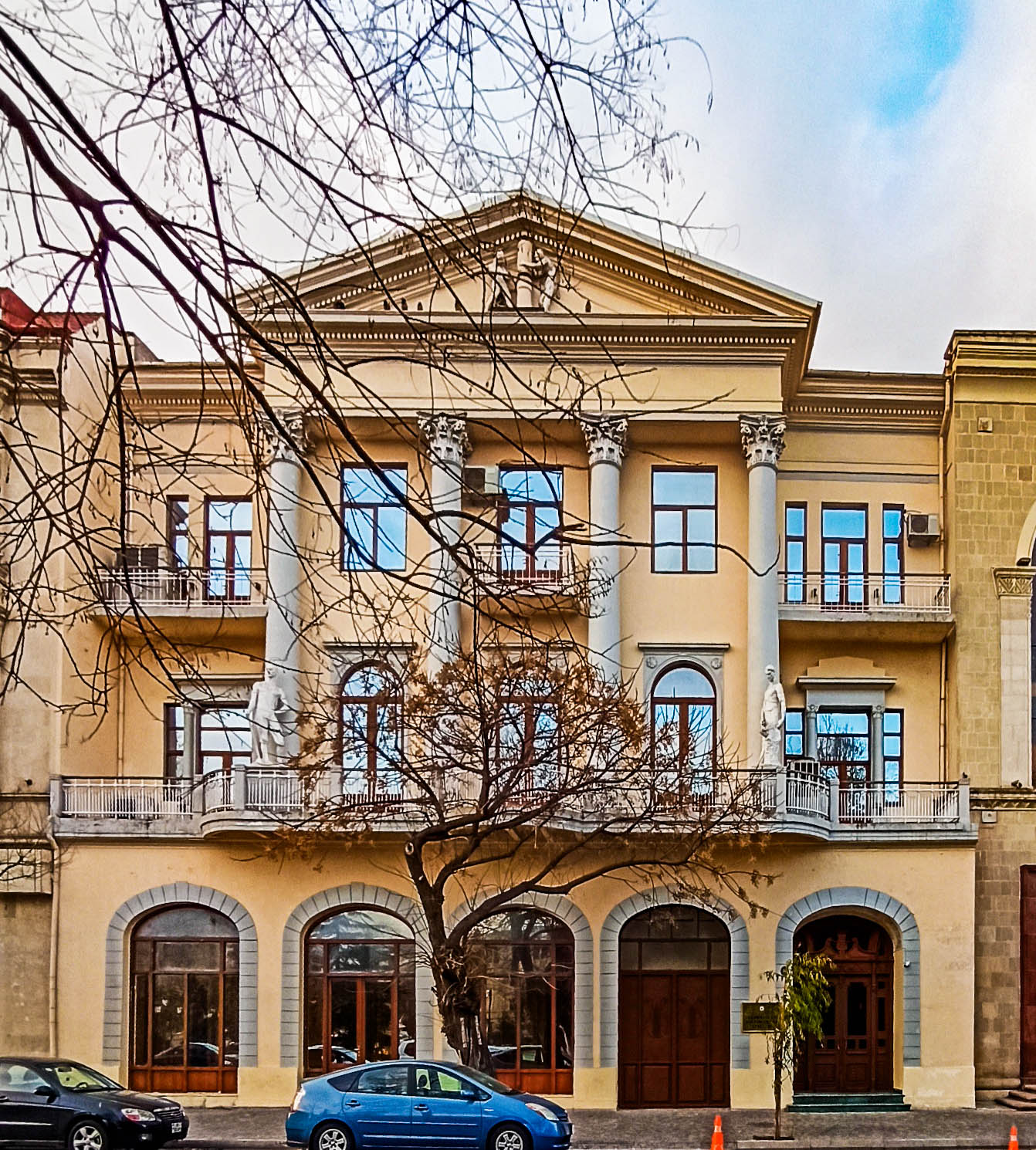
- Interactive map of the Union of Composers Building area

General information
- Location: Khagani Street 55, Sabail, Baku, Azerbaijan
- Completed: 1912

The Union of Composers Building, also known as the Palace of Culture of Mining Workers or the House of Pioneers, is a 3-storey residential building in Baku, Azerbaijan, built in the early twentieth century. The building housed the Union of Miners of Azerbaijan, the House of Pioneers, the Turkish Embassy, and since 2008 the Union of Composers of Azerbaijan.

== About ==
The building of the Union of Composers of Azerbaijan was built in 1912 as a 3-storey property at 27 Molokanskaya Street (now 55 Khagani Alley). Since 1922, the Palace of Culture of Mining Workers has been located here. In 1924, sculptor Stepan Erzya was commissioned to make sculptures for the facade of the building. The statues on the façade are placed in 3 horizontal directions.

The lowest level of the statues depicts two blacksmith statues symbolizing strength and intelligence, the middle level depicts a worker and a driller symbolizing the production process, and the highest level depicts an Azerbaijani and Russian worker clinging to a stump, symbolizing the proletarian unity of peoples and the common struggle for the future. The fact that the worker is a blacksmith and a driller wearing boots and drinking alcohol, as well as having a mustache, means that they are Azerbaijanis. Due to the lack of marble and bronze, the statues were made of cement and iron remnants with a strong acid content. These were the first statues dedicated to oil workers.

Later, the Pioneers' House was located here. After independence, first the consulate of the Republic of Turkey and then the embassy were located here. On April 14, 2008, the building was put into operation by the Union of Composers of Azerbaijan.

== Photos ==
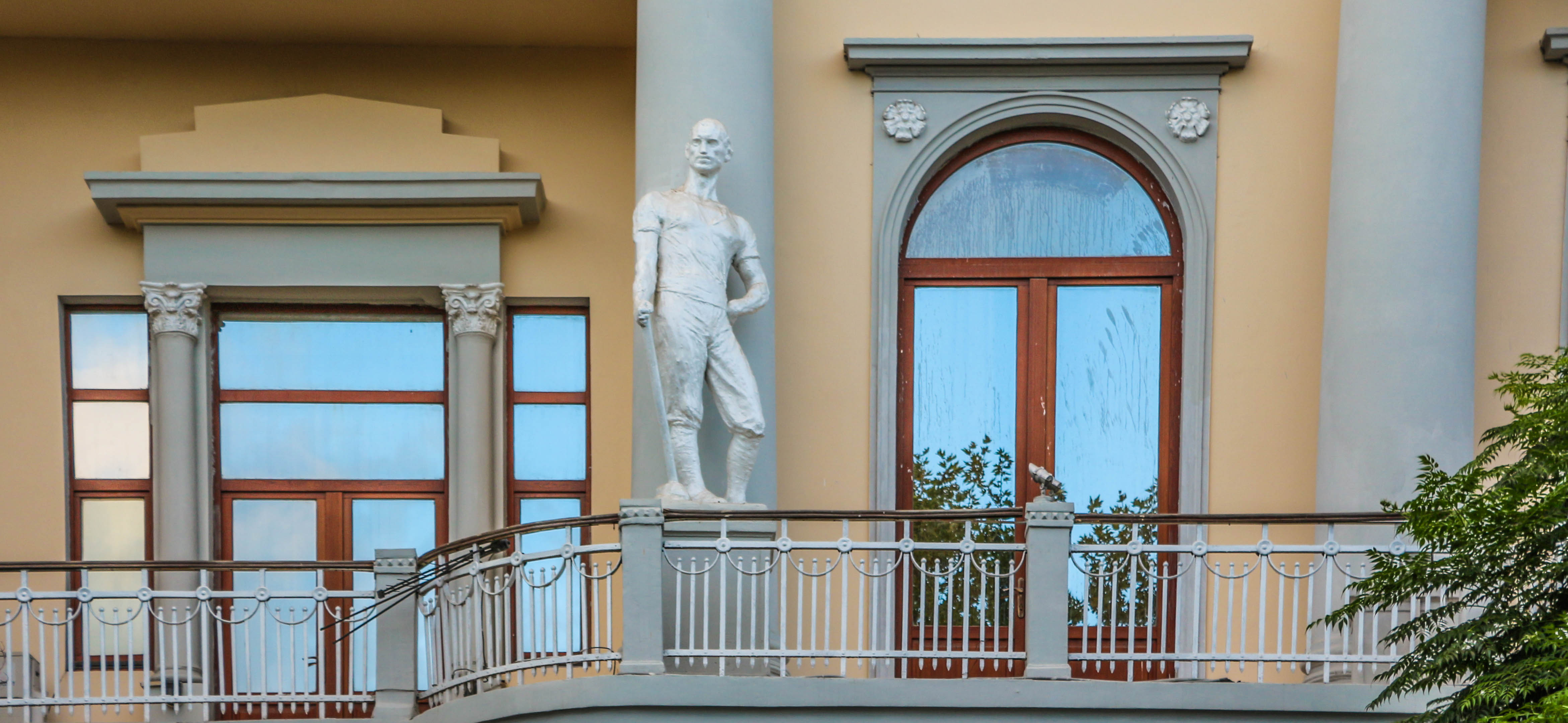

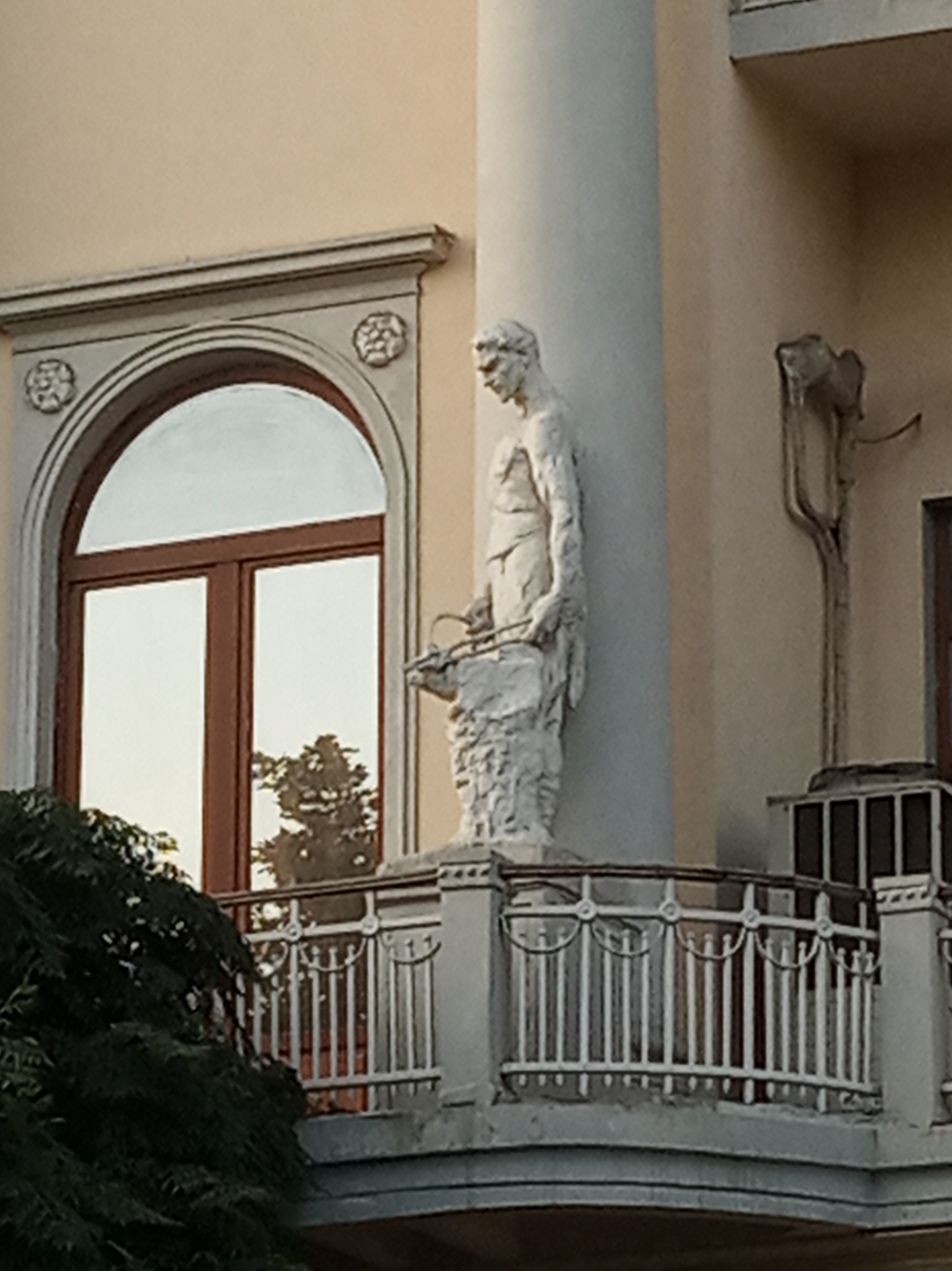

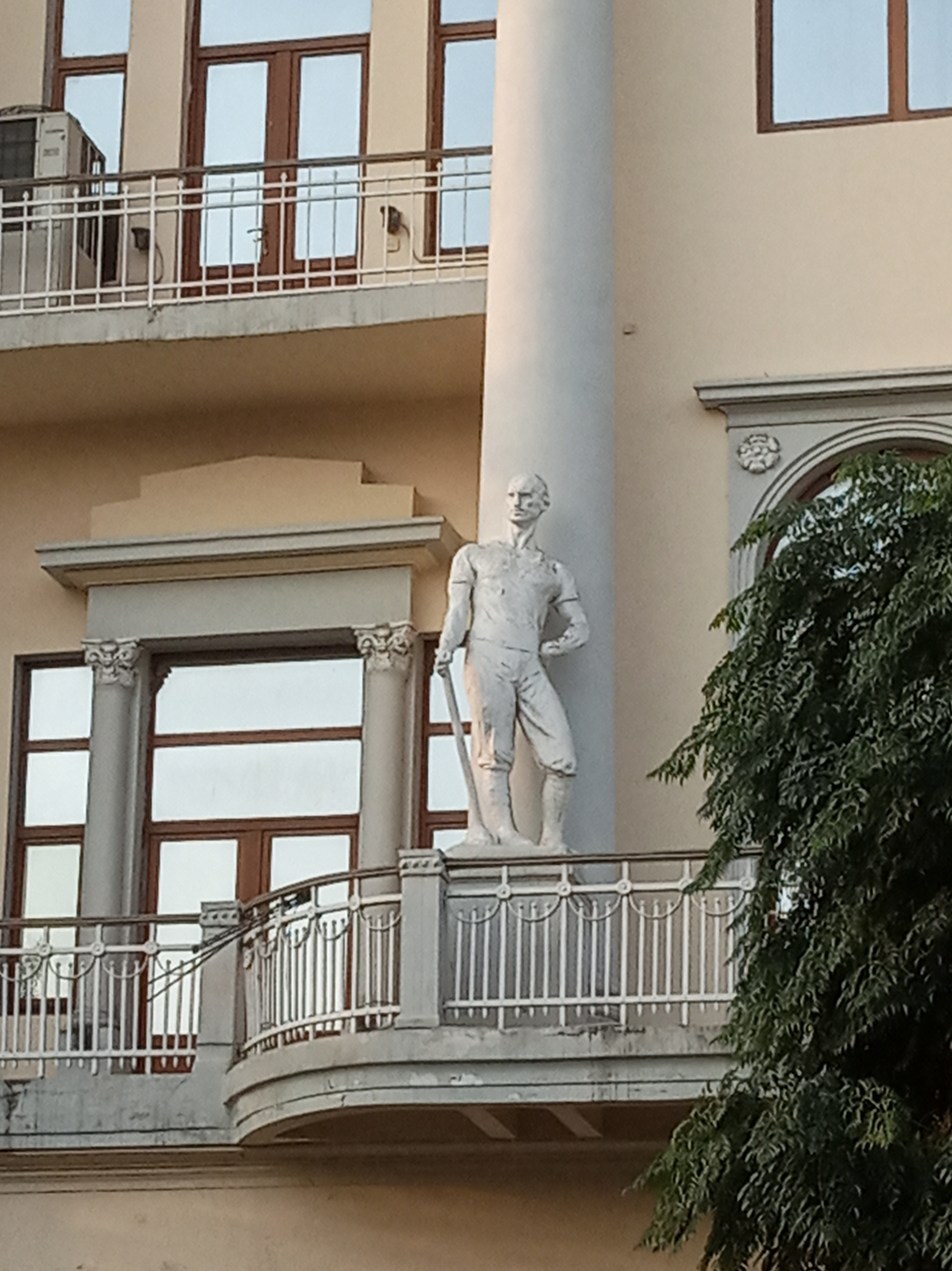

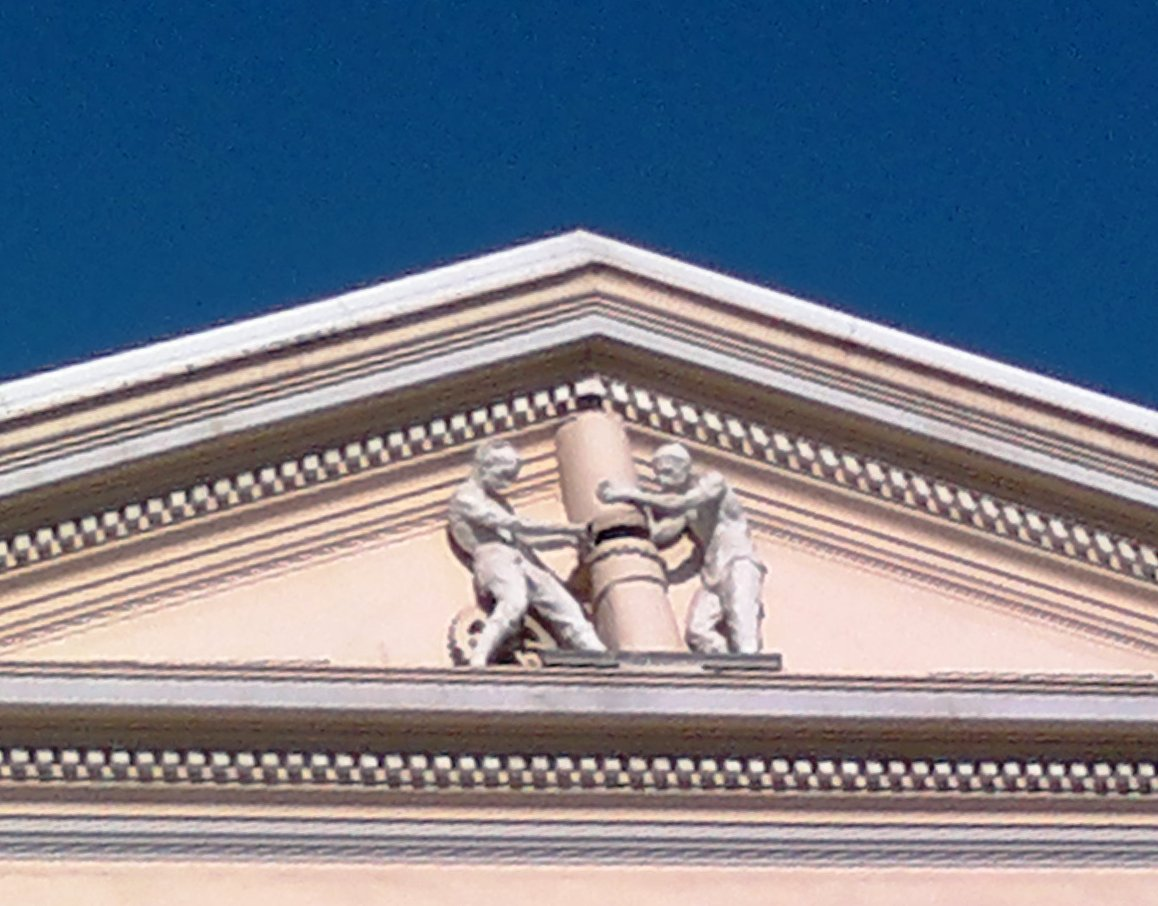

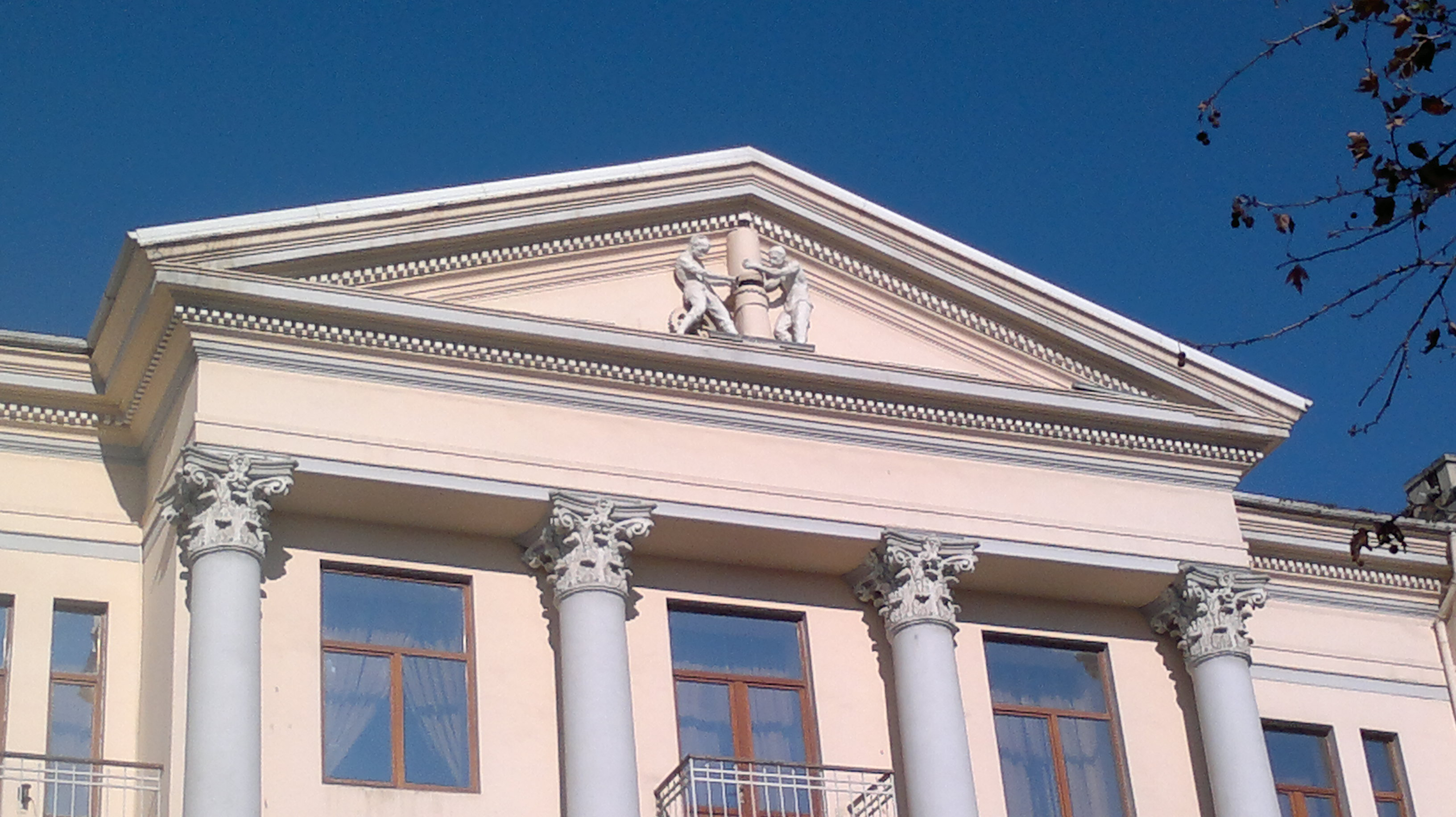

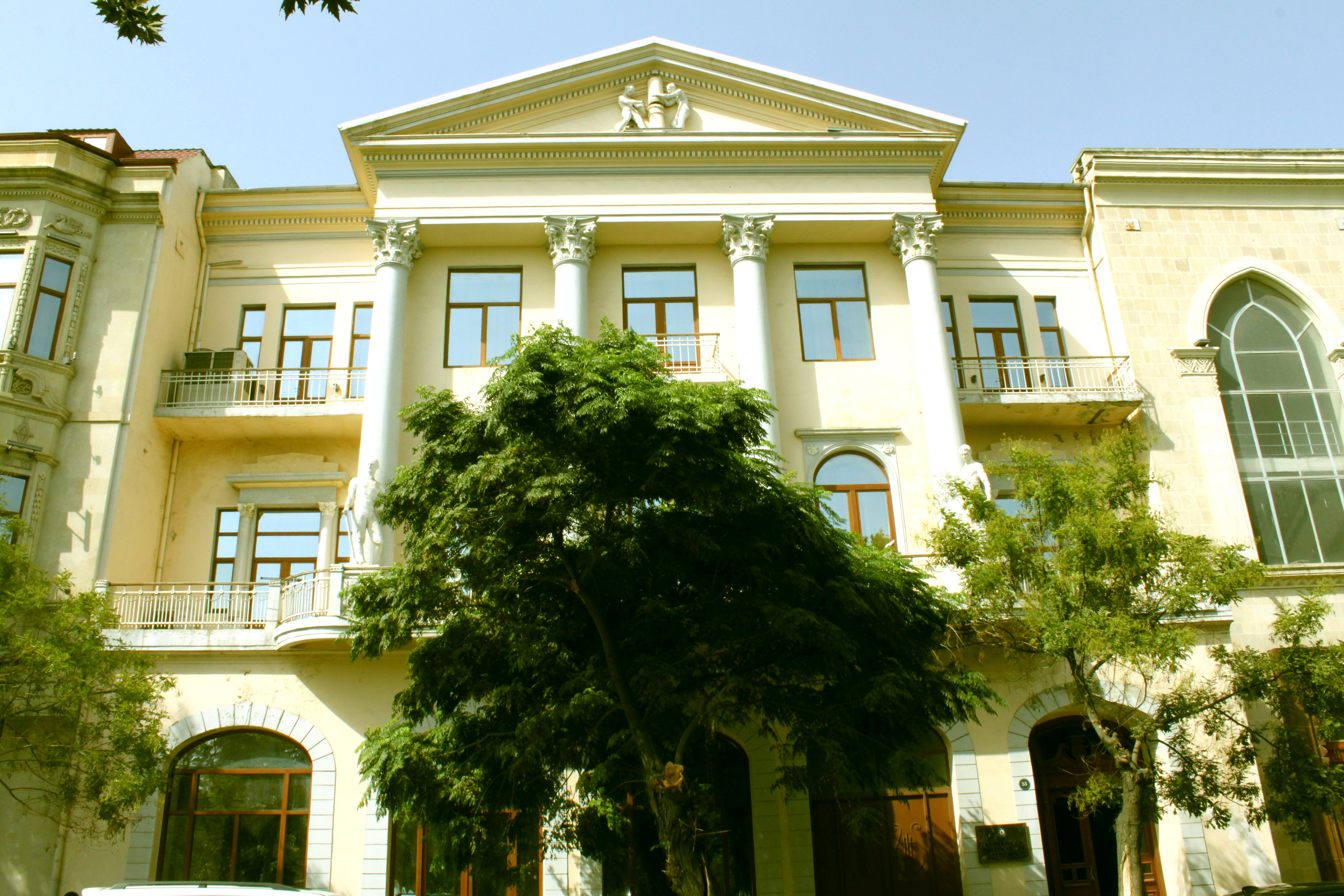

== See also ==
- Ismailiyya Palace
- Mitrofanov Residence
- Property of Haji Mustafa Rasulov
