= Architecture of Baku =

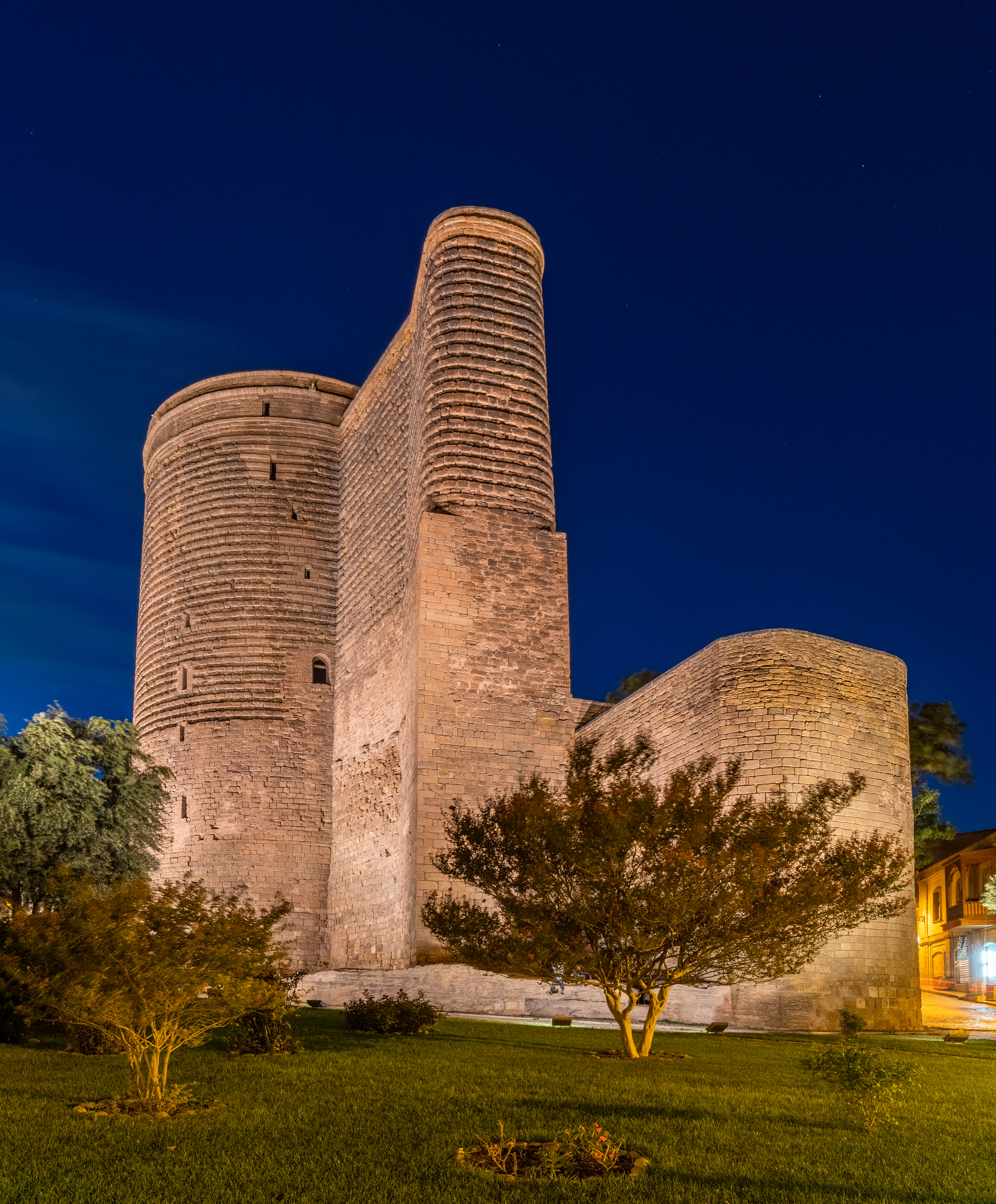
The Maiden Tower, one of Baku's top tourist attractions

The architecture of Baku is not characterized by any particular architectural style, having accumulated its buildings over a long period of time.

In itself, Baku contains a wide variety of styles, progressing through Masud Ibn Davud's 12th century Maiden Tower and the educational institutions and buildings of the Russian Imperial era.

Late Modern and Postmodern architecture began to appear in the early-2000s. With the economic development, old buildings such as Atlant House have been razed to make way for new ones. Buildings with all glass shell appear around the city, with the most prominent examples being the SOCAR Tower and Flame Towers.

Several monuments pay homage to people and events in the city. The Martyrs' Lane provides views of the surrounding area whilst commemorating the victims of Black January and Nagorno-Karabakh conflict.

== Islamic architecture ==
With Shi'a Islam being the dominant religion of Azerbaijan, there are many Islamic architecture featured buildings that reside in Baku. Religious places have more Islamic calligraphy drawn on the columns and other places on the structure. In December 2000, the Old City of Baku, including the Palace of the Shirvanshahs and Maiden Tower, became the first location in Azerbaijan to be classified as a World Heritage Site by UNESCO.

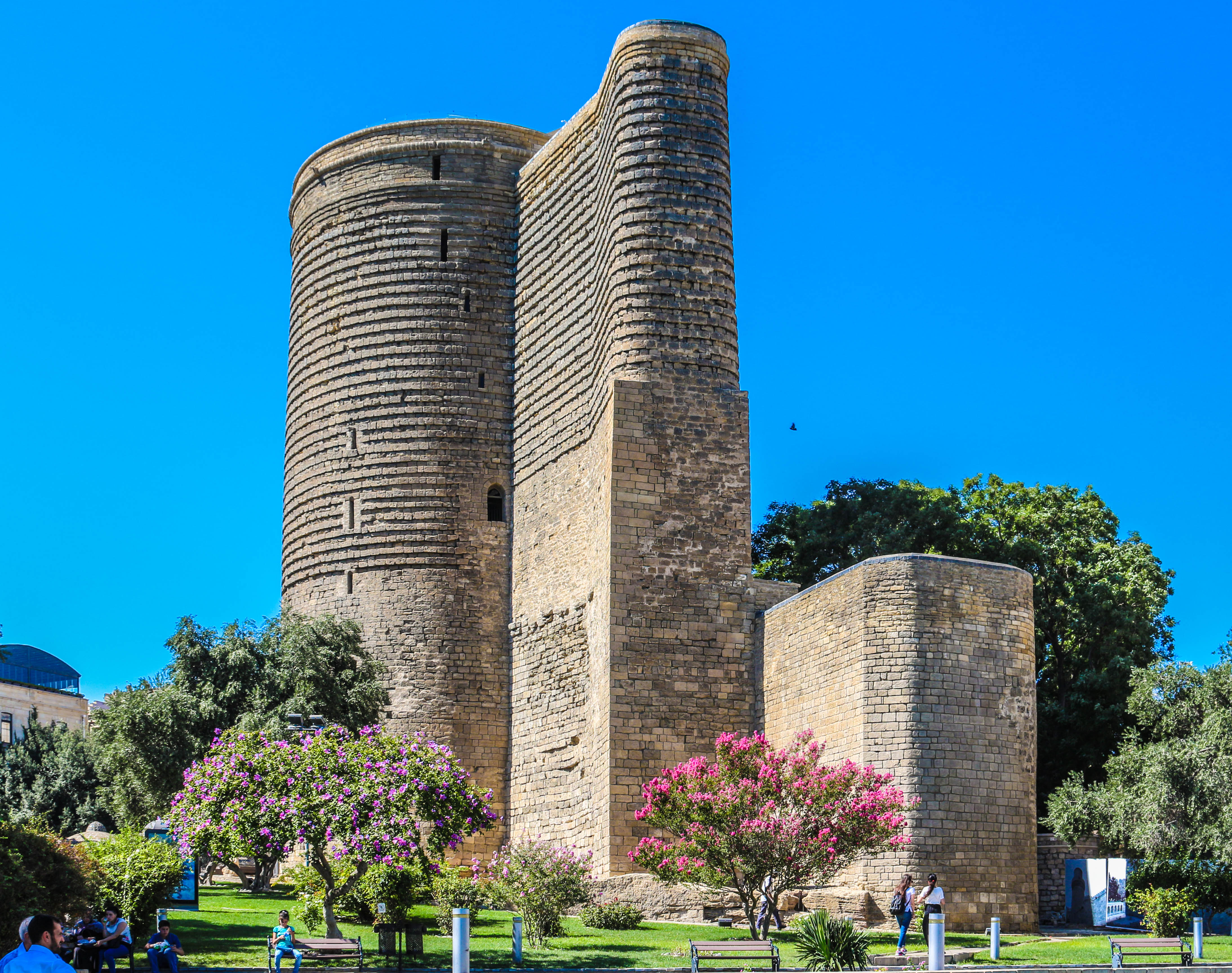
Maiden Tower

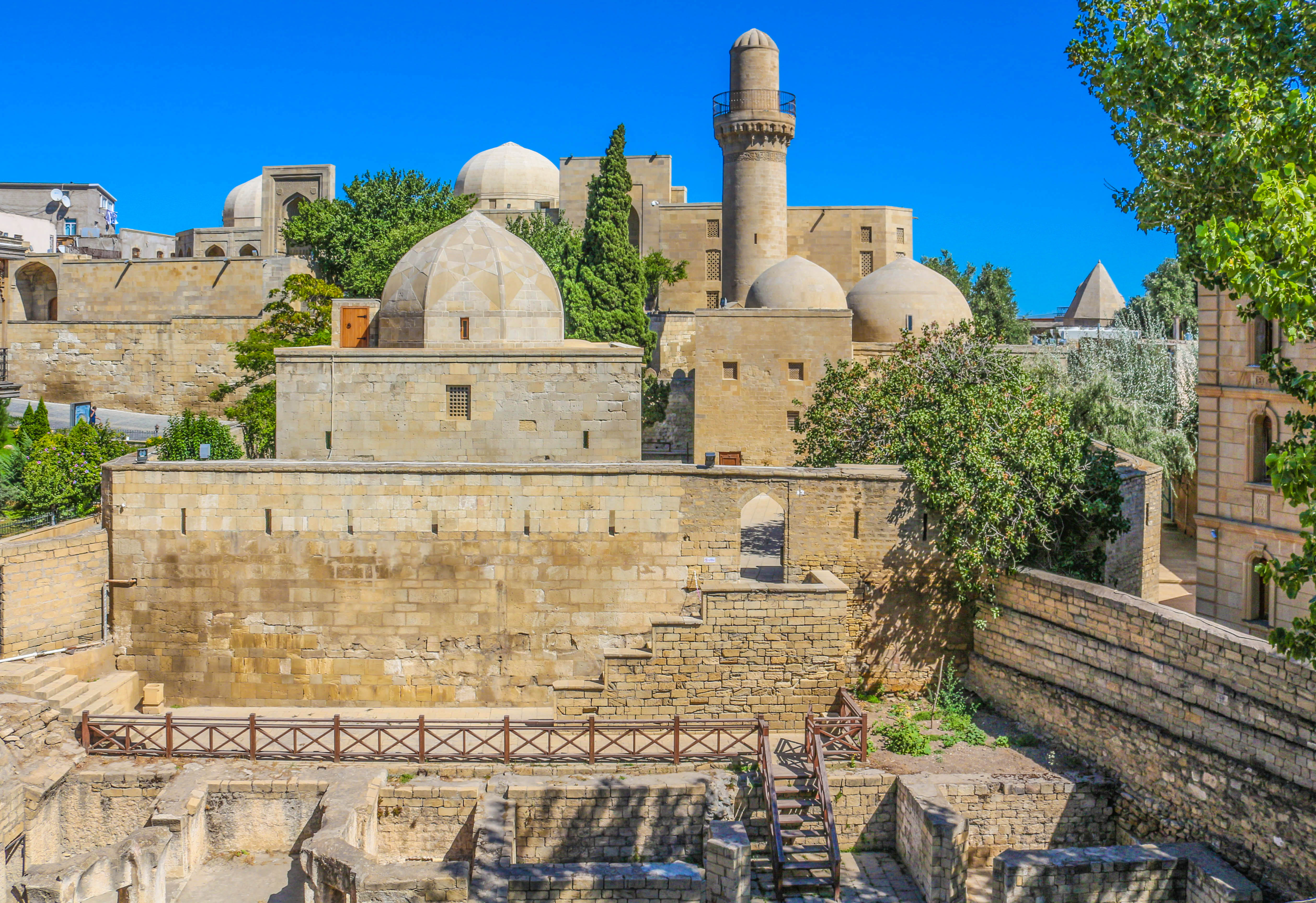
Palace of the Shirvanshahs

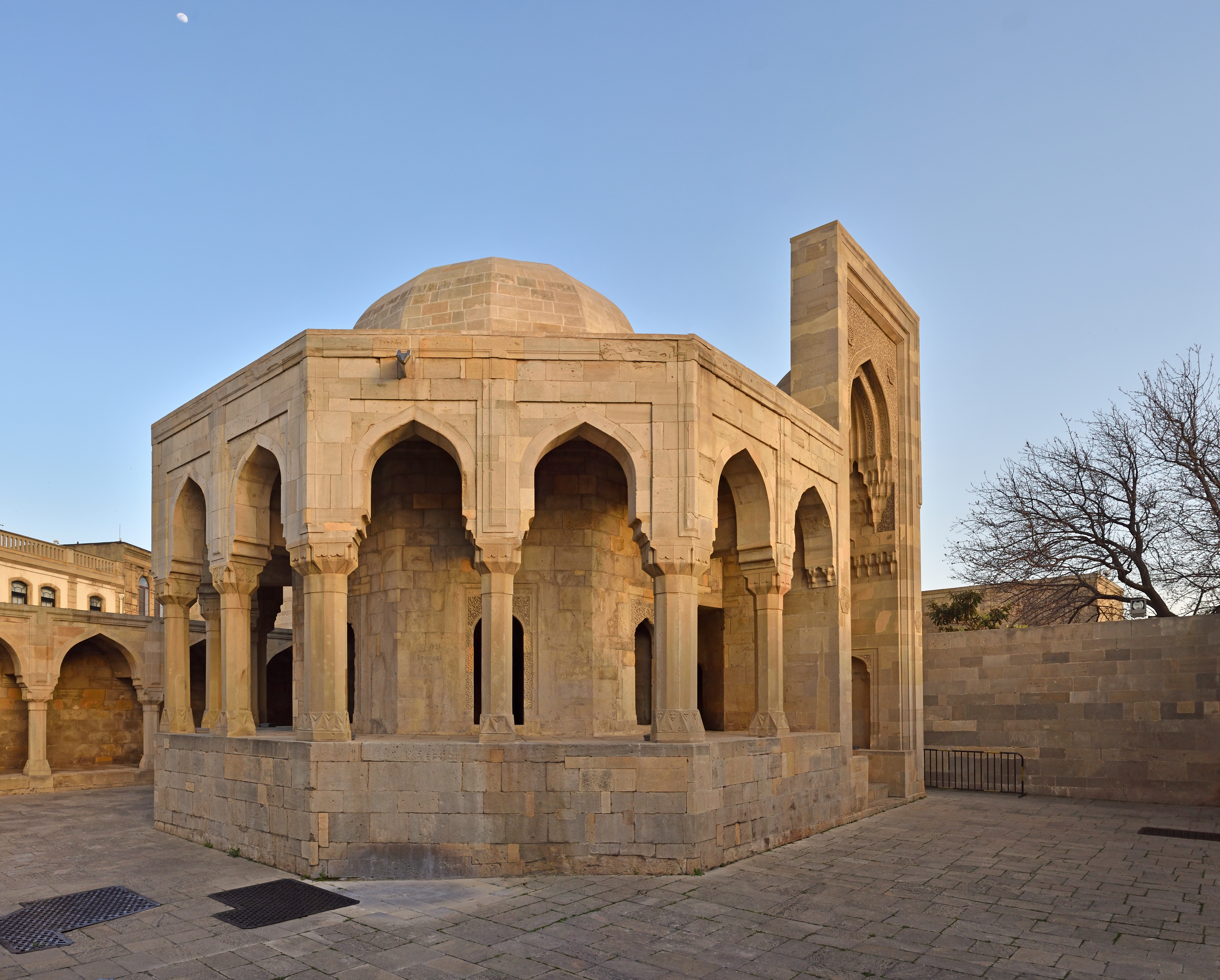
Divankhane in the Palace of the Shirvanshahs

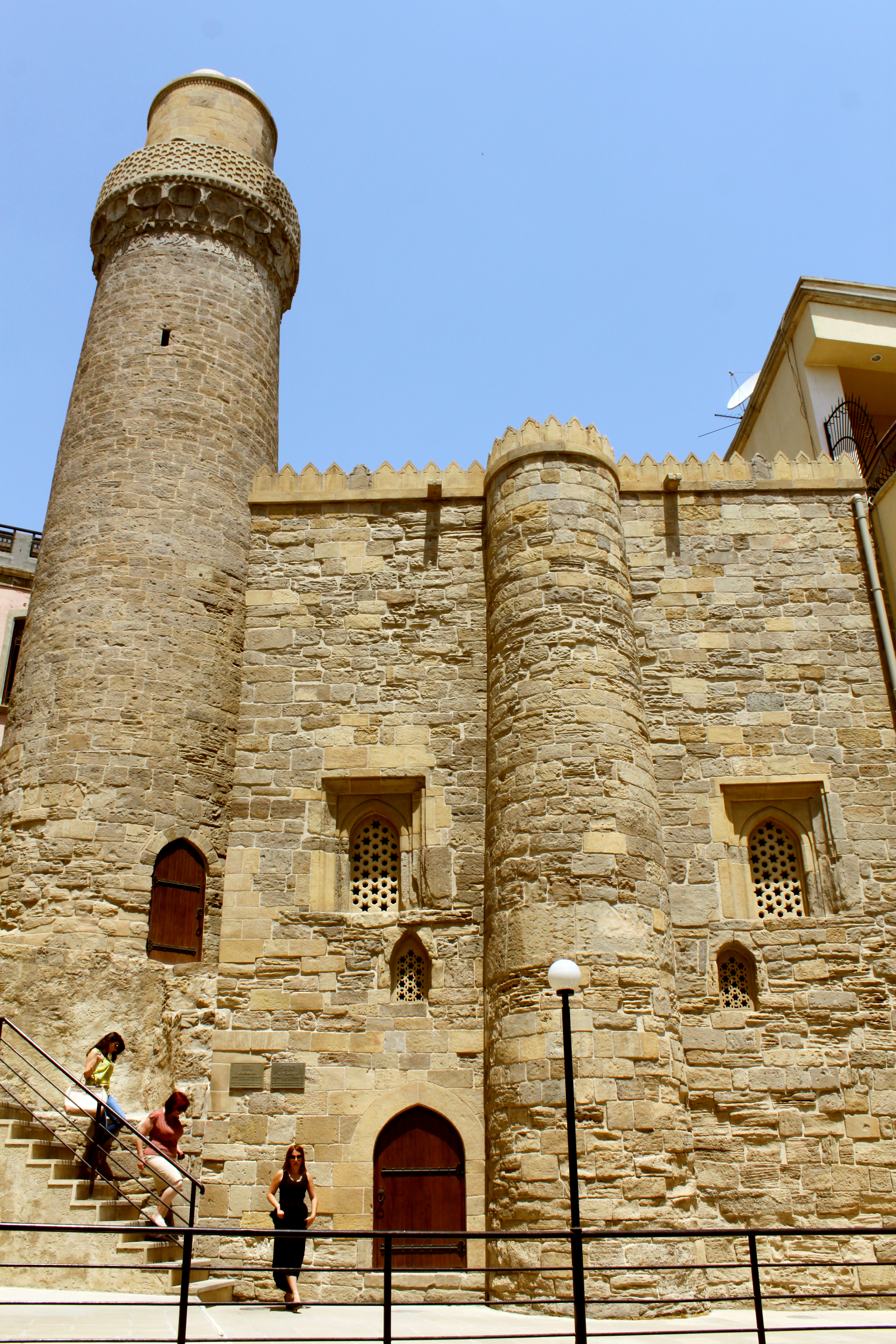
Mahammad Mosque with Minarat, located in Inner City of Baku

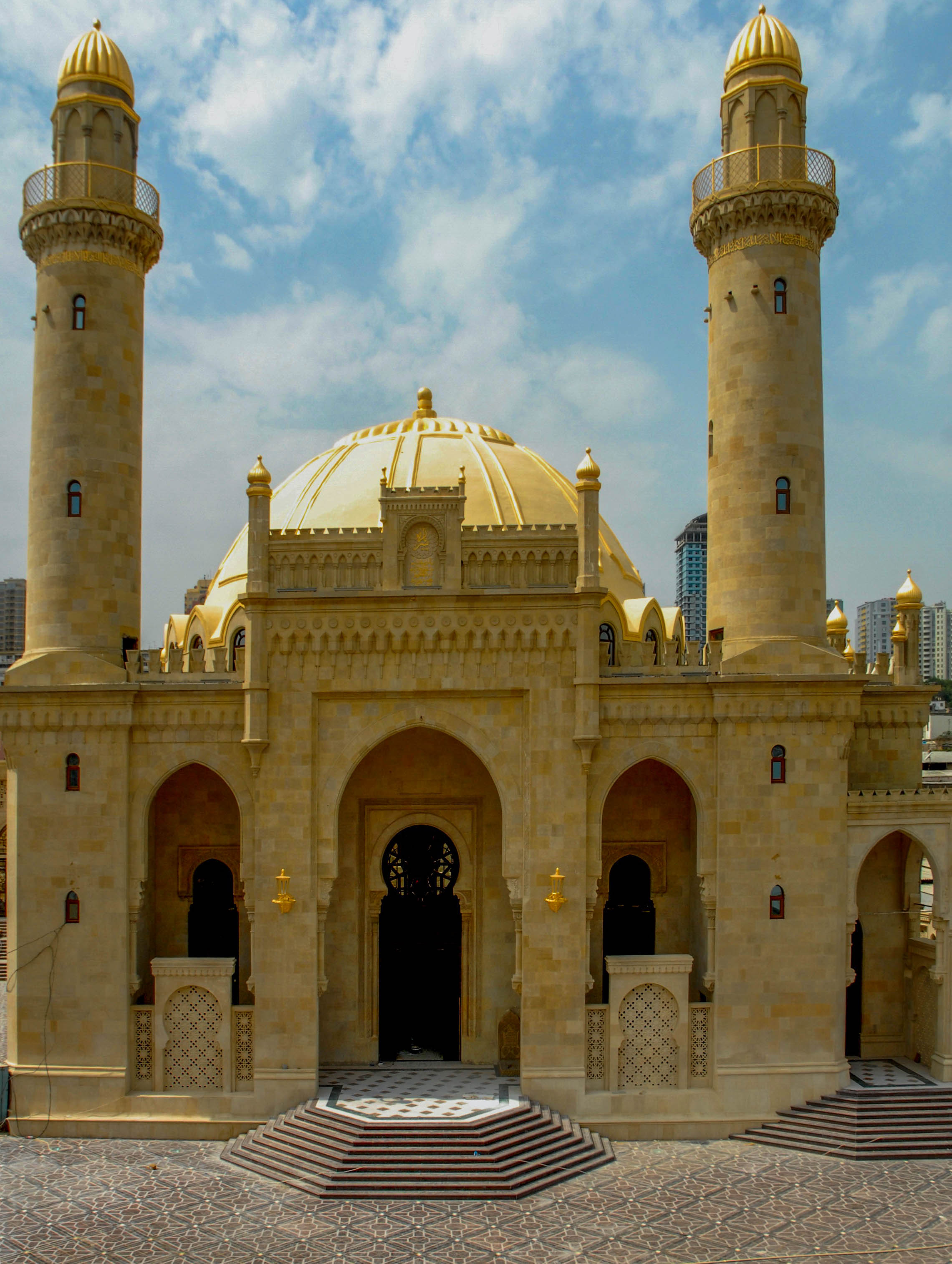
Tazapir Mosque

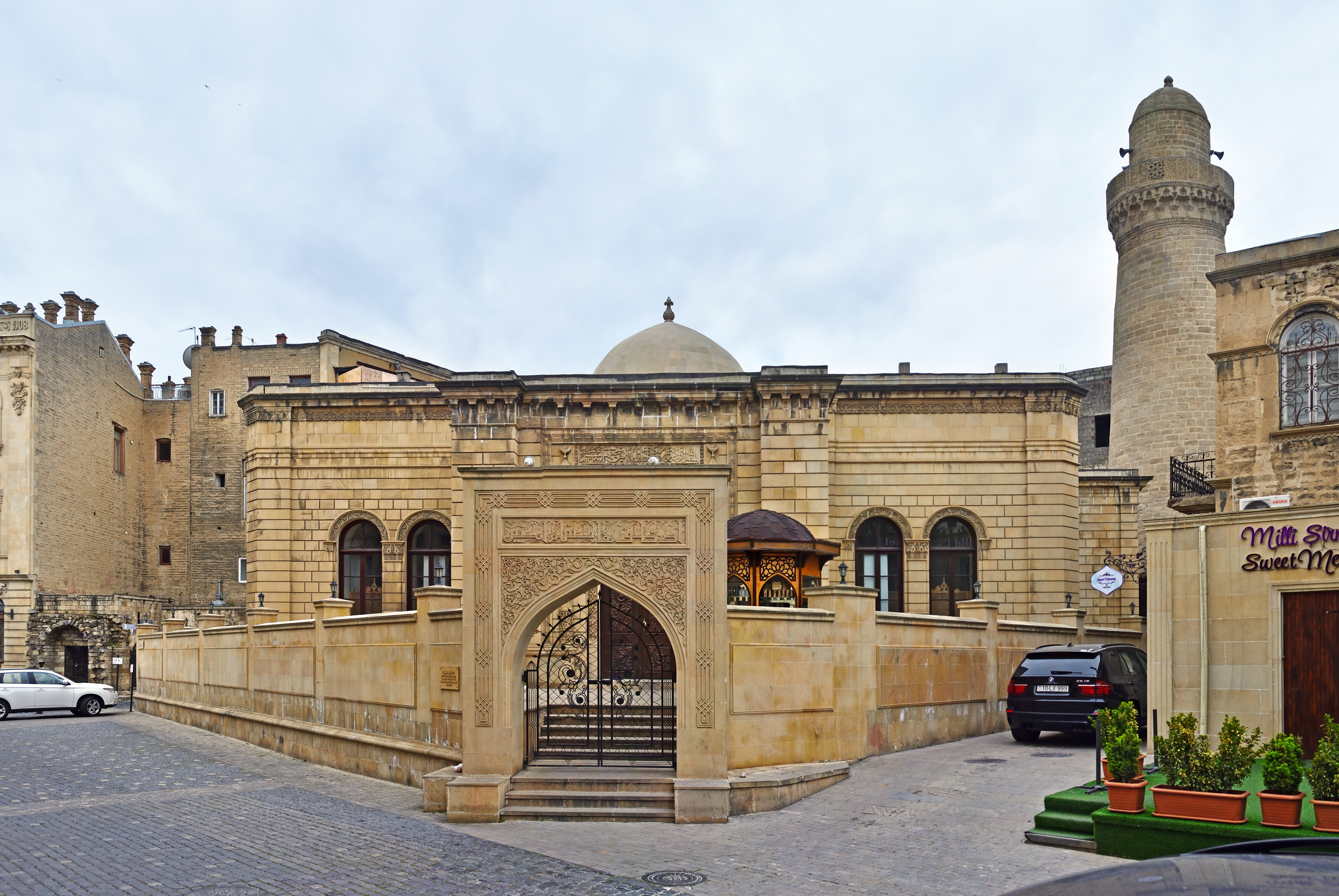
Juma Mosque of Baku

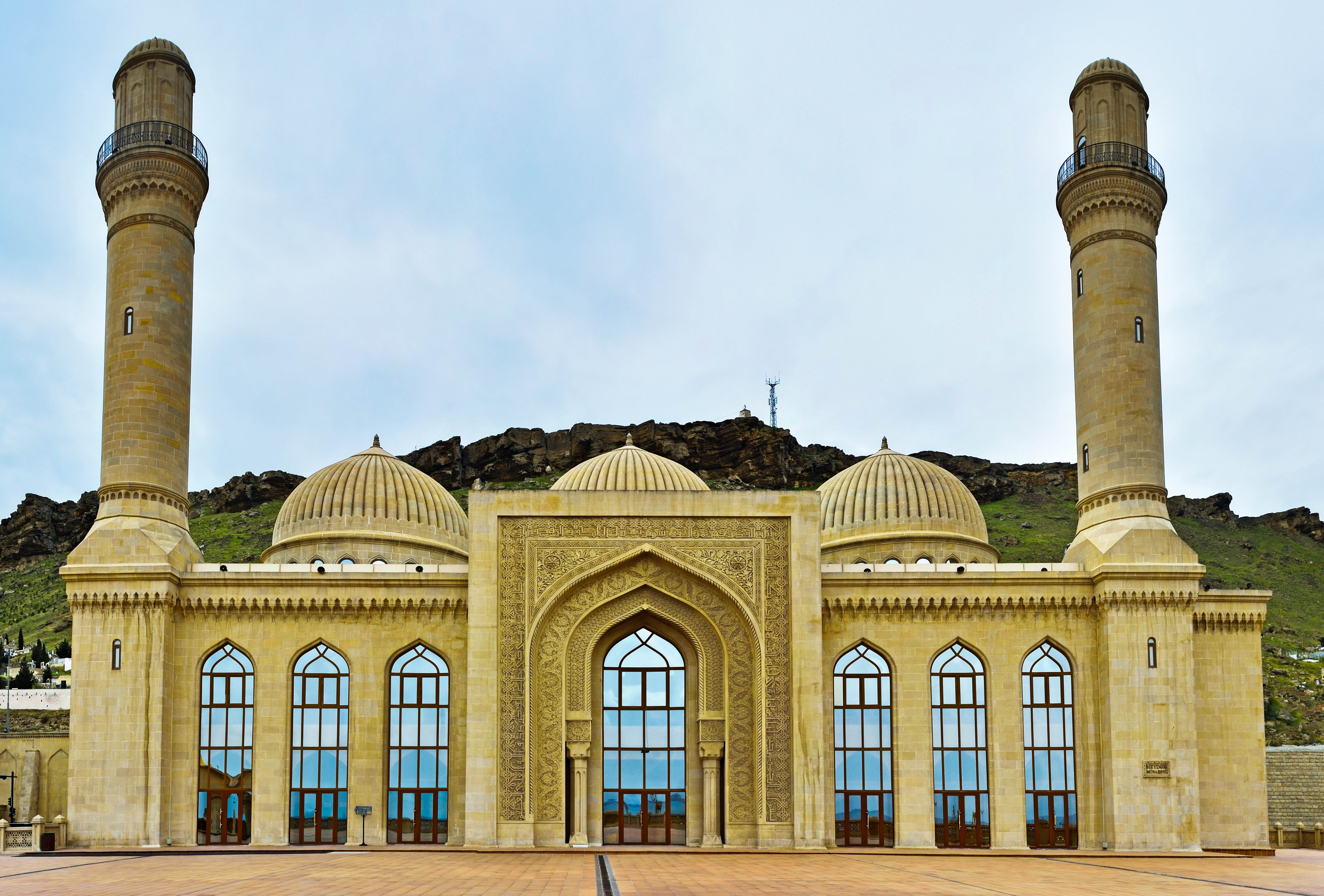
Bibi-Heybat Mosque

Islamic buildings continued to be constructed in Baku during the Imperial period. In particular, the Ajdarbey Mosque in then outskirts of the city was built in 1912–1913.

== Imperial Russian and the Azerbaijan Democratic Republic era ==
=== Urban development and construction ===
With the boom of the oil industry in Baku came an influx of both foreign western cash and ideas. Eclectic architecture fusing not only east and west, but several western styles as well became prevalent in the architecture found in the city outside the medieval walls. Local oil industrialists had the opportunity to travel, particularly to Europe, where they came back with ideas of the European architectural styles, and had both the desire and the capital to recreate them. Two industrialized districts would be created to the east of the original medieval city and Russian garrison, the denser and older Black City and the newer, sprawling White City.

The Black City was the first example of a planned industrial district in the Russian empire, it would be separated from the original residential and commercial zones by a two-kilometer buffer zone. A dense 80 sq meter block grid would be created, designated for a flexible factory-based use. Contemporaries would comment on how dirty this district was, with the black oil smoke that filled the air giving the area its name.

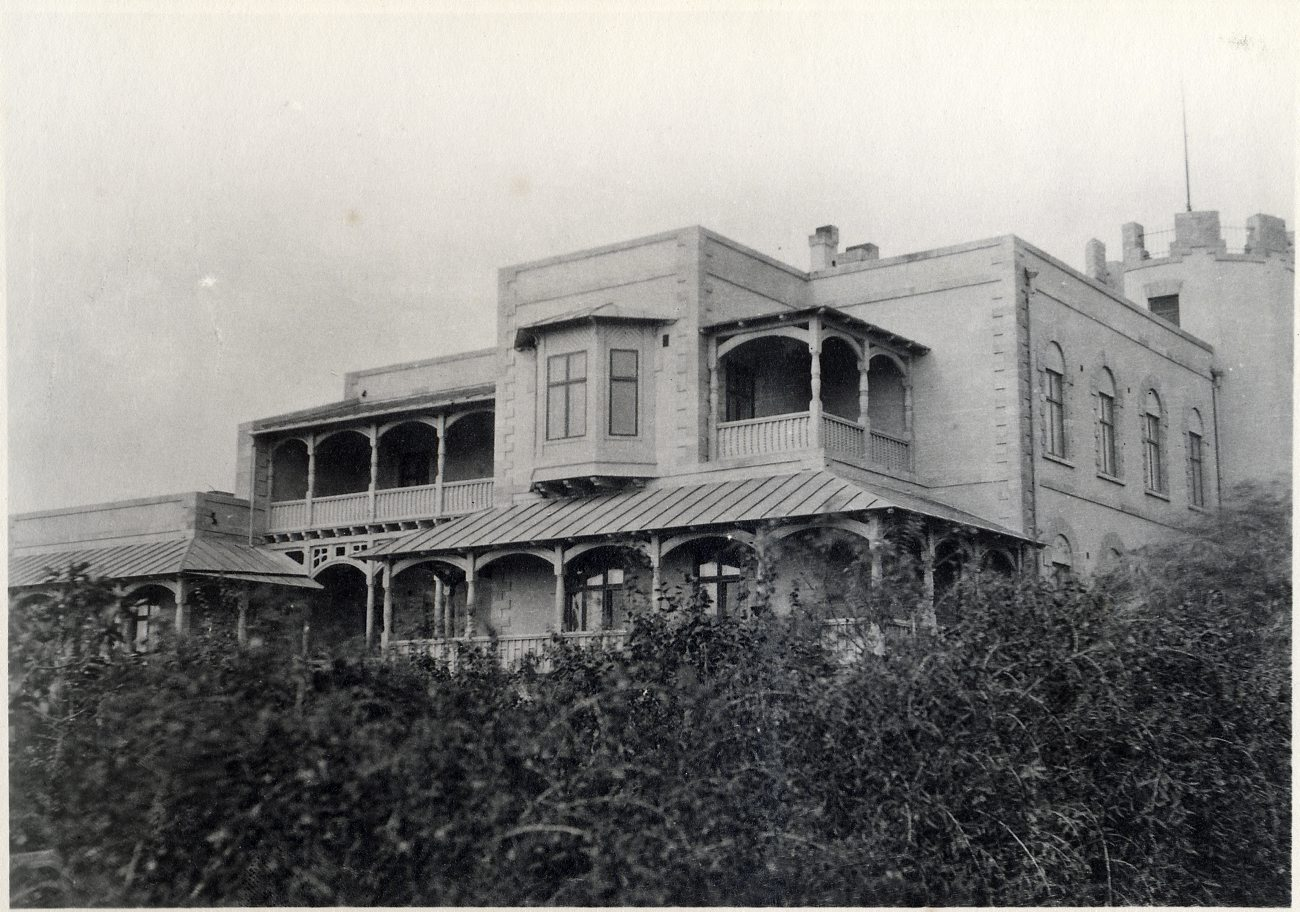
The Nobel oil refinery manager's residence, on the border of the Black city in "Villa Petrolea"

As Baku grew industrially, the White City would be developed to house the growing industry. It was characterized by its lack of a block structure, instead opting to have larger blocks (about 500x300 meters on average), irregular in size, which would accommodate to the shape taken by the factories rather than the other way around. The White City would grow to mainly house only select new refineries, which were cleaner than those used in the Black City, and would also be home to some of the workers housing developments created by the owners of the factories and refineries.

What had started as an oil boom in Baku soon turned to a construction one with the quick and massive influx of capital to the city. The city's population grew rapidly, at a rate faster than contemporary New York. The foreign population started to exceed that of the local Azeri's, and with it came western influence in construction. Due to the intensity and rapidness of development, the city was developed both vertically as well as horizontally, with most new construction boasting large foundations meant to have more levels added to it with the next influx of capital. Most of the construction was made using the local limestone quarried near the city, and the first few layers of development tended to be of vaulted masonry, meant to be structurally strong enough to develop additional stories on top later on. It was an architecture characteristic of that of an oil boomtown, one that was meant to be adapted and added to with the next boom. A side product of this rapid development, however, was un regulation in proper city planning, something complained about by contemporaries. There was a lack of proper street planning, lighting planning, transportation systems, and sanitary arrangements.

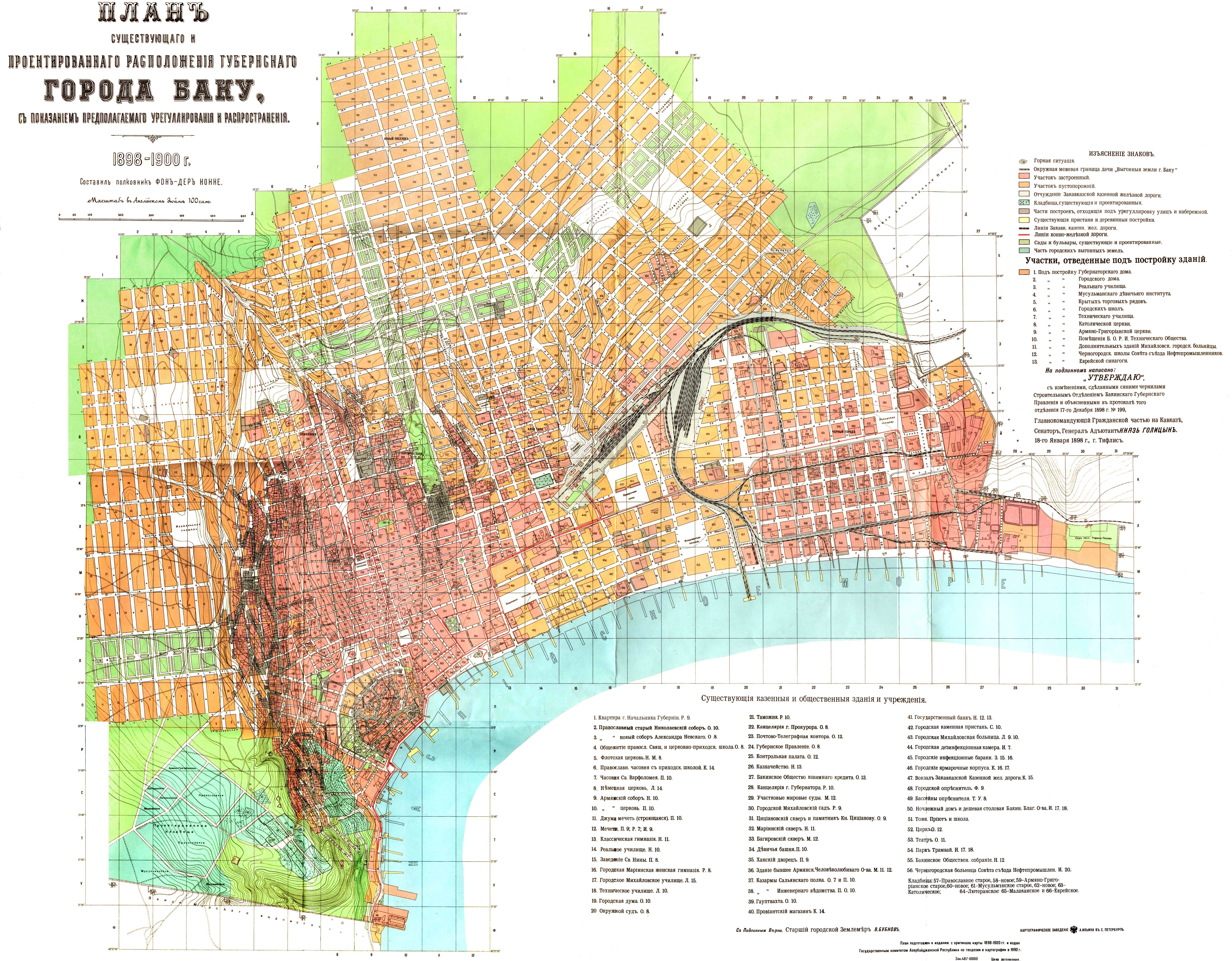
Plan of Baku 1898-1900, masterplan by Von der Nonne

In a second cycle of construction, oil industrialists who had made their fortunes in the 1870s and 80s would develop the area between the medieval walled city and the Black City in the 1890s and early 1900s, creating the metropolitan Baku that would be nicknamed the "Paris of the Caspian." They would model the area after the great European cities of the time, with wide canopied boulevards, a seaside esplanade, monumental civic buildings, and all the new technologies in communication and transportation. The oil barons competed with each other to donate the most lavish and monumental civic buildings, but the initial construction was spearheaded by Haji Zeynalabdin Taghiyev (1823?-1924), one of the most philanthropic of the industrialists. The first Azerbaijani National Theater was founded in 1873, as well as another theater built in 1882. Parks and educational centers such as vocational schools were given great importance during this time, including Baku's first school for Muslim girls in 1910, designed by Josef Goslavsky, who was then the Chief Architect of Baku. Soon more of the wealthy industrialists followed and competed in a philanthropic battle of donating towards the development of the city, such as Musa Naghiyev and Shamsi Asadullaev. Many of the hallmarks of a thriving cosmopolitan city were constructed during this time. The Baku City Duma was built from 1900-1904, also designed by Goslavsky in an Italianate renaissance style on the northern edge of the medieval walled city.

Construction of buildings in Baku remained largely using the limestone available locally, with other materials easily brought down the Volga and through the city port. Unlike their European and Russian counterparts, however, they were not covered in stucco because of the local climate. Instead, the limestone was intricately carved, and thus used in creating ornamentation of the facade.

=== Oil baron mansions ===
As well as competing between each other in philanthropic purposes, the oil industrialists of the 1880s, 90s, and early 1900s would compete with each other to build the most lavish mansions in the new residential quarters they created. They imported architects as well as style preferences from their travels to Europe, and sought to emulate the grand urban palaces they saw for themselves in Baku. These mansions would become emblematic of the distinct architectural style of pre-Soviet Baku, a fusion of east and western styles in the eclectic style which was popular in the period.

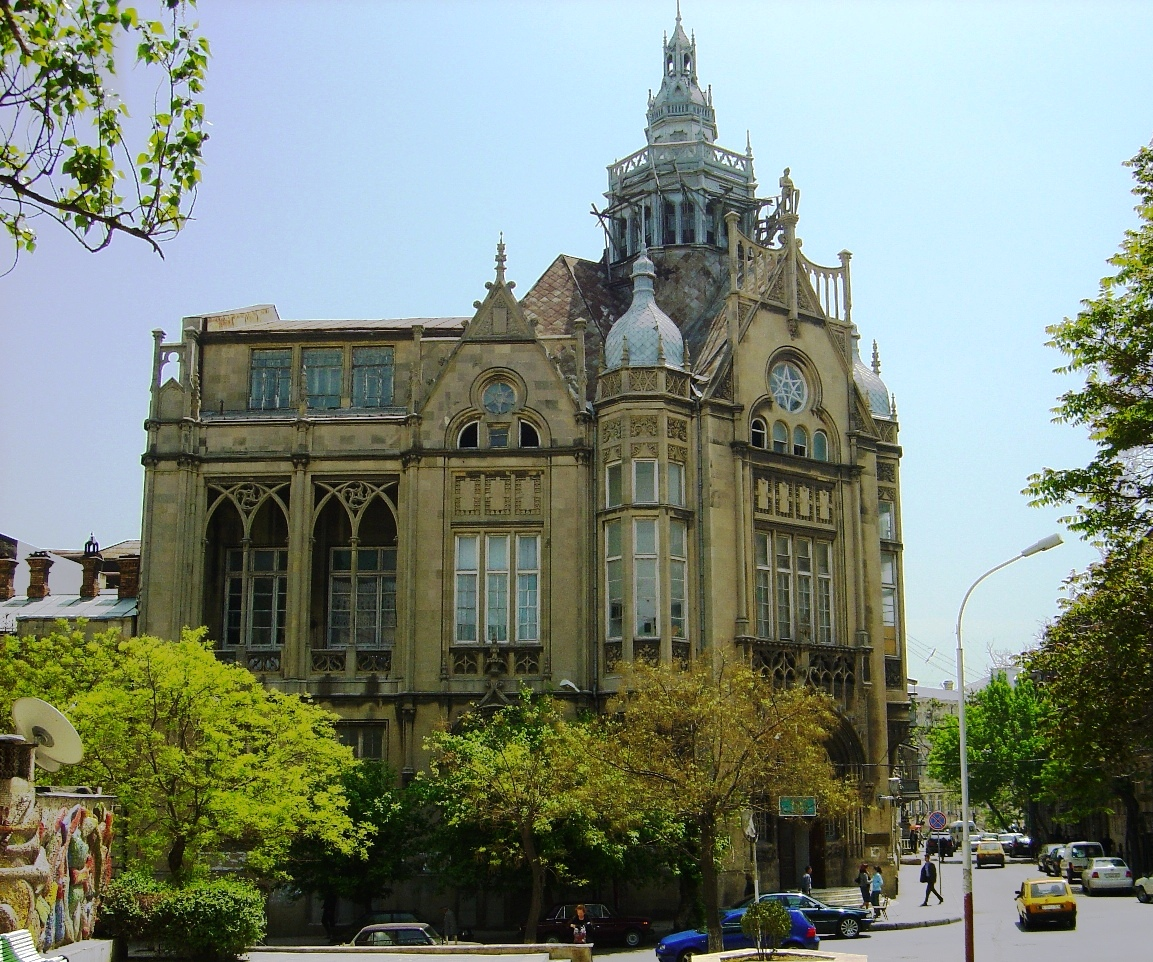
Originally the Mukhtarov residence, it was converted to a Wedding Palace during the Soviet period

It started as an importing of purely Western styles, in some cases an almost exact copy, created from modified plans of a European palace. Such is the former residence of Murtuza Mukhtarov, built for his wife after she liked a French gothic palace they visited. Mukhtarov would obtain the plans, hired the polish architect I. K. Ploshko to modify the plans, and built in 1911-1912. After invasion by the Red Army it was converted to a "wedding palace," a purpose to which it still serves today.

The Taghiyev residence (1895-1902) is another example of the western style in the architecture, designed by the polish architect Goslavsky in the Italianate renaissance style he was known for. It is known for its heavily decorated interior, with a gilded main gallery on the second floor. It was richly decorated with a mixture of Art Nouveau ornamentation and furniture. It was converted to the National Museum of History of Azerbaijan under the soviets, and the limestone chiseled "T" for Taghiyev is still visible in the facade after a Soviet attempt to remove it. As the mixing of western styles with eastern elements continued, architects from places ranging between Germany, Russia, and Poland would design not only variations of eclectic mixes between Gothic and revival styles, but also eccentric mixes such as a three-story mansion shaped like a dragon, a house in the shape of a house of cards, and another supposedly covered in gold leaf.

=== Gallery ===
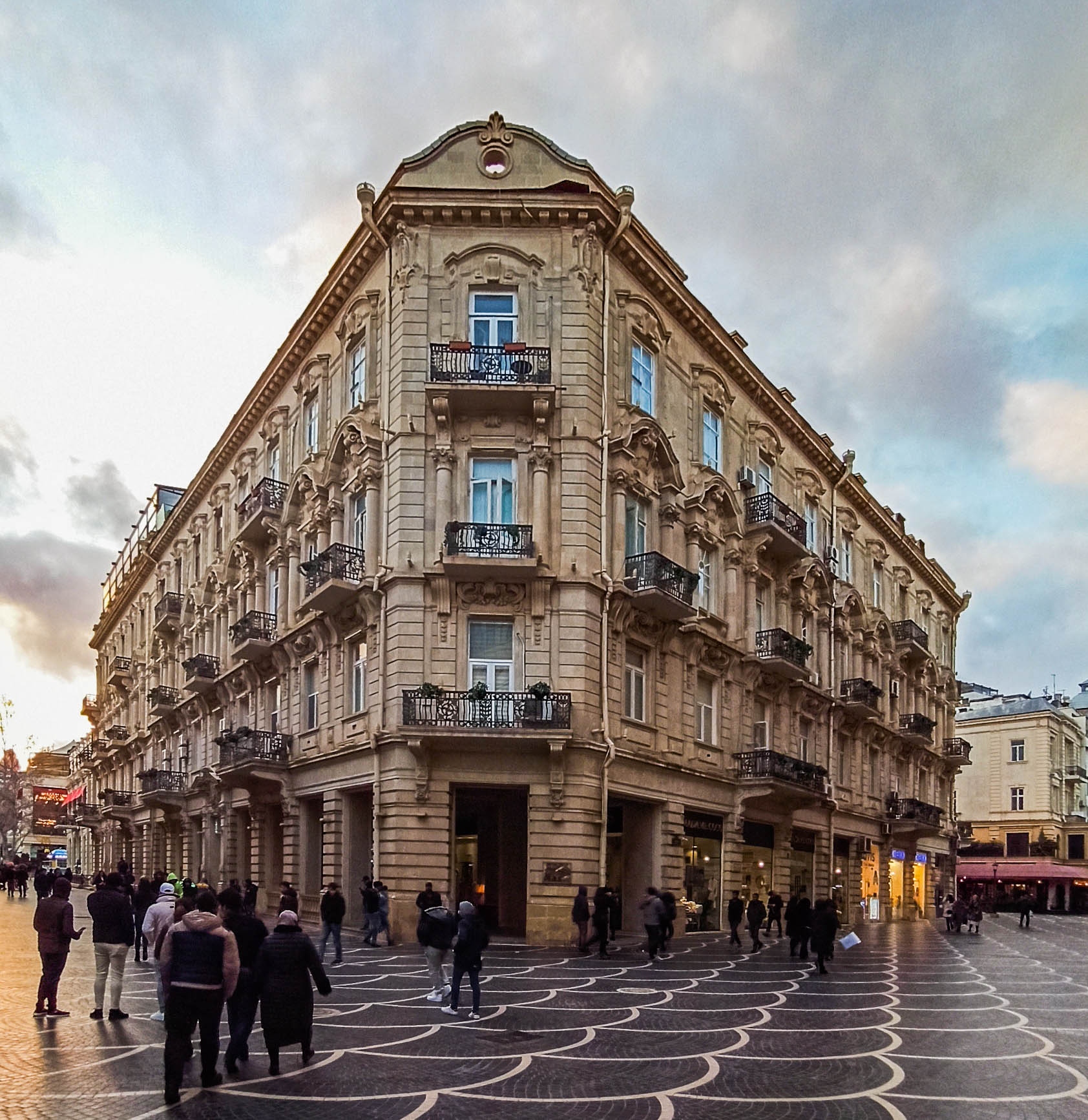
Fountains Square and House of Musa Nagiyev

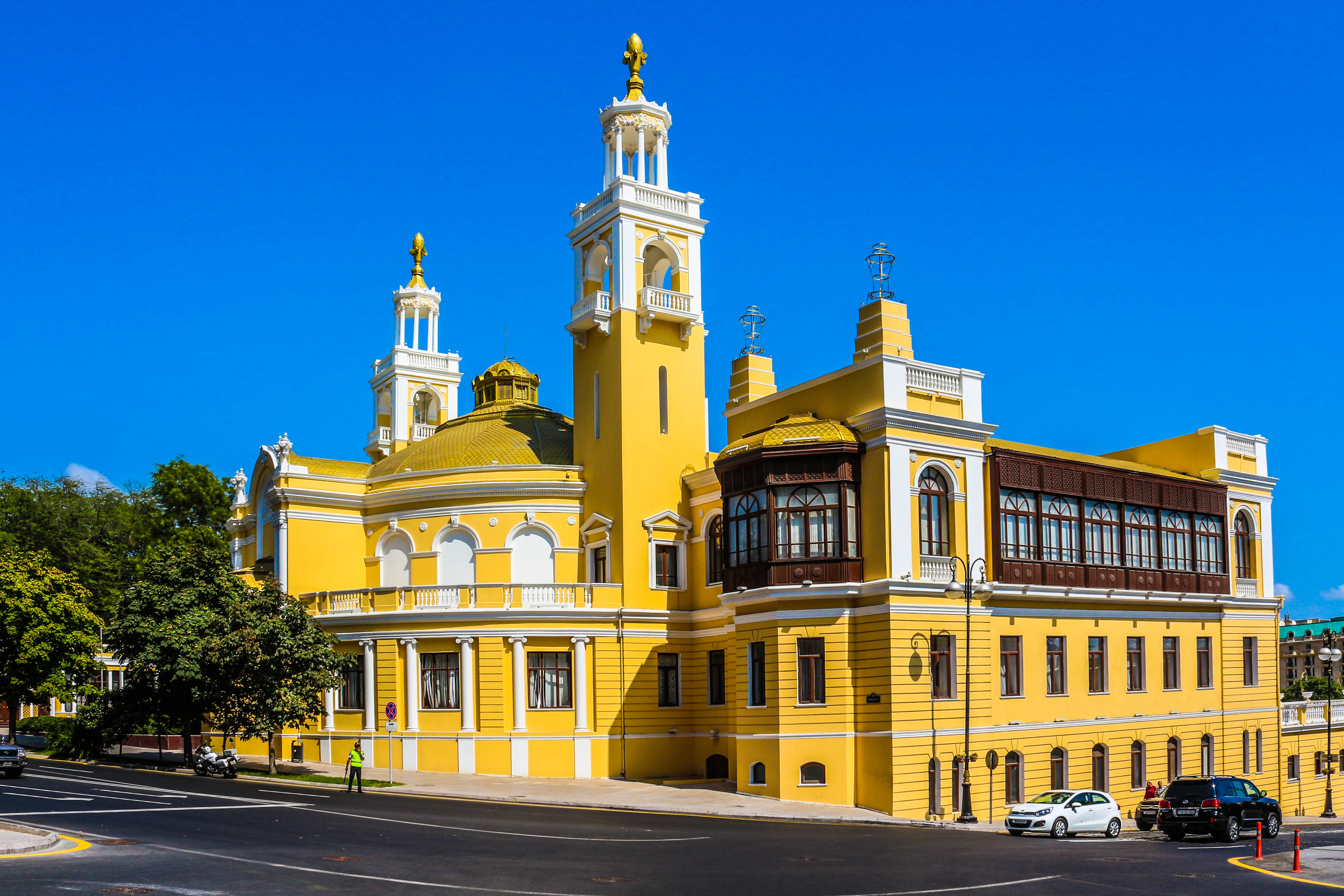
Azerbaijan State Philharmonic Hall

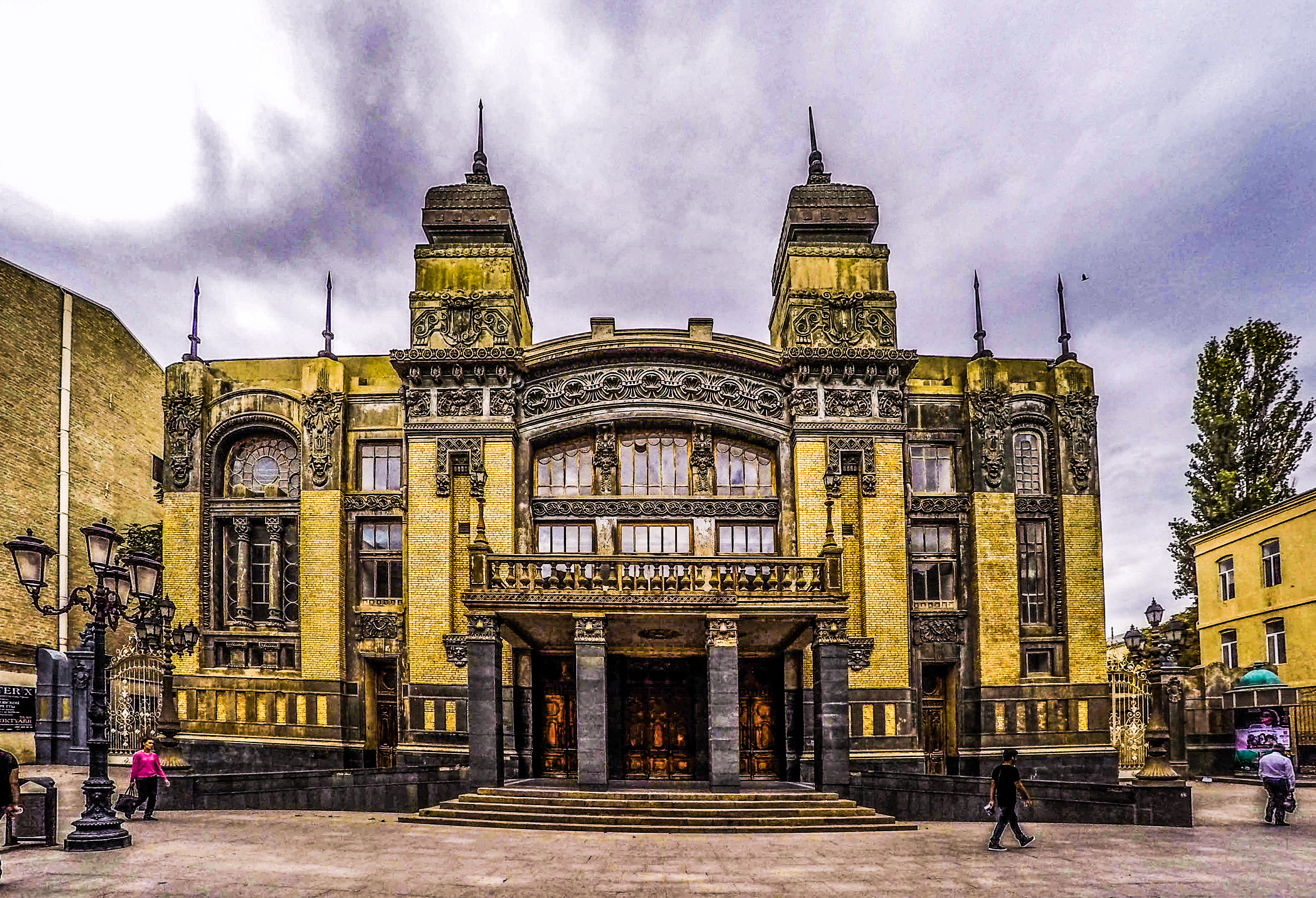
Azerbaijan State Academic Opera and Ballet Theater

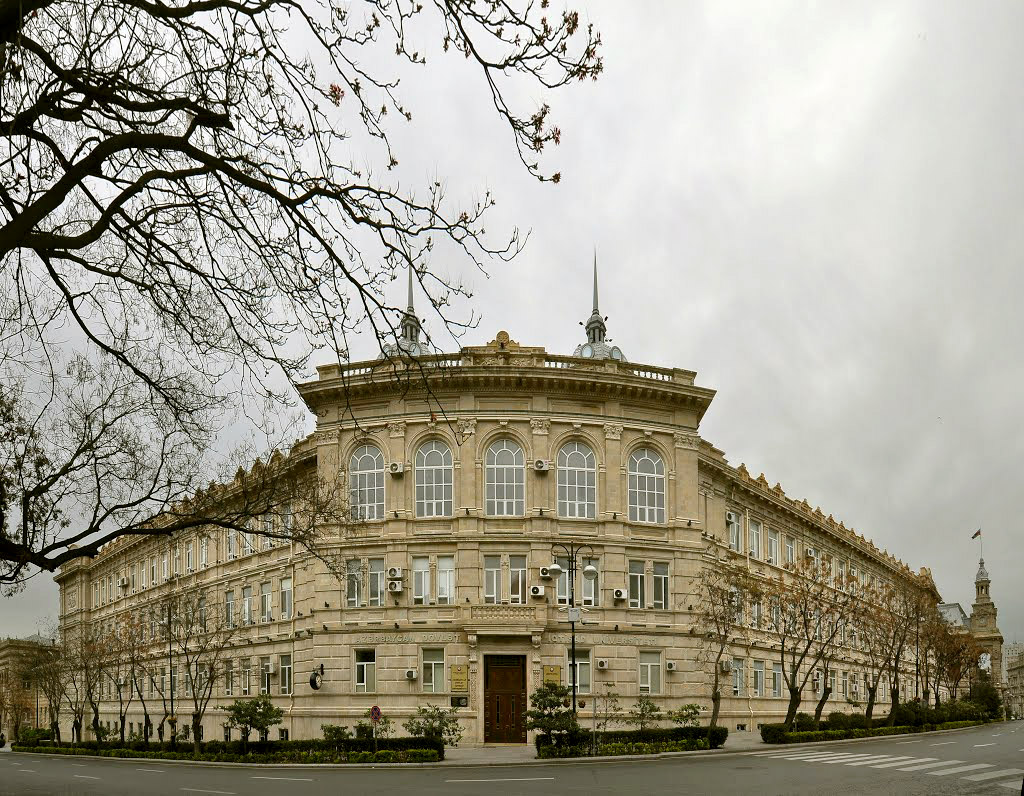
Azerbaijan State Economic University

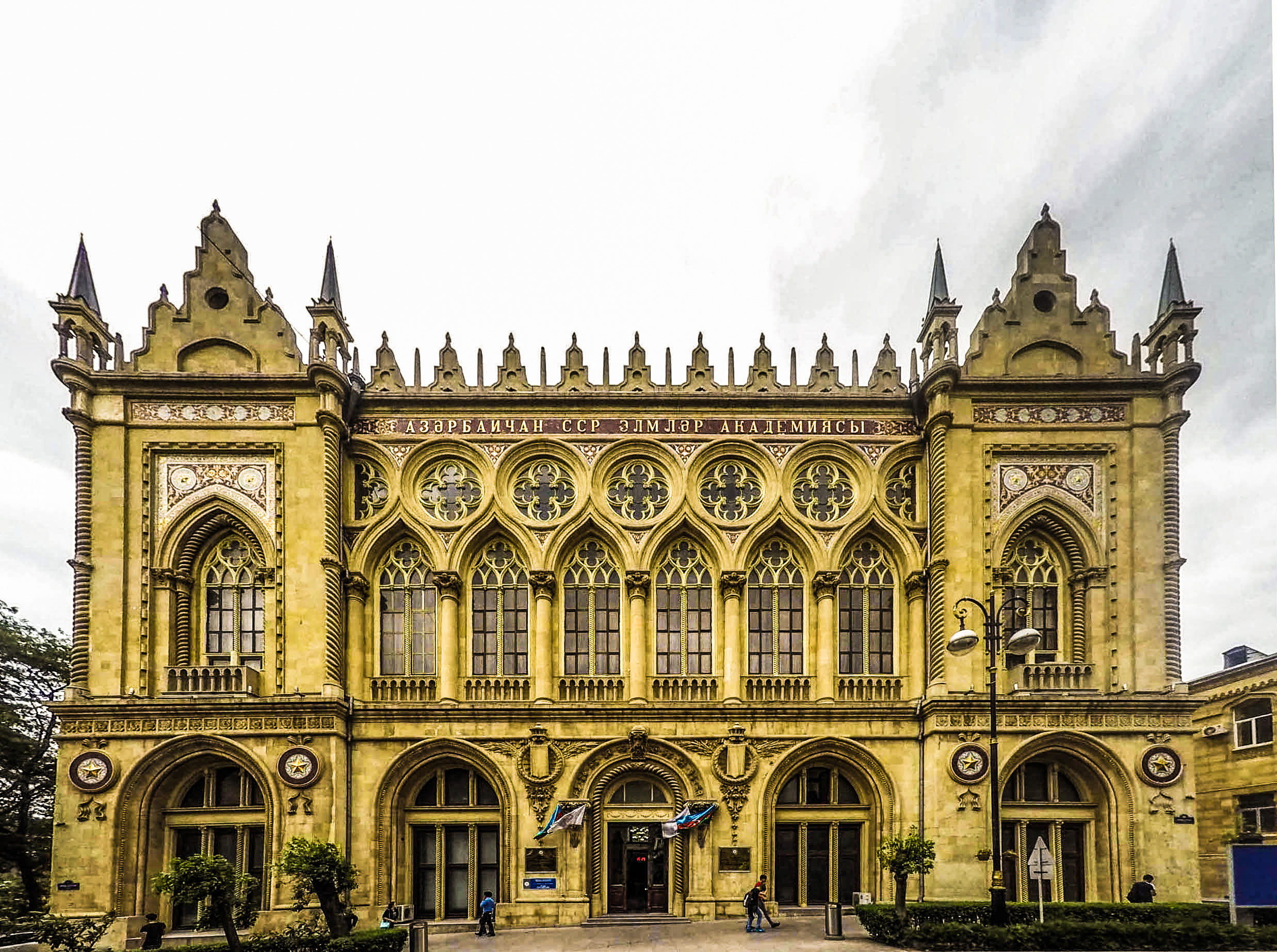
Ismailiyya building

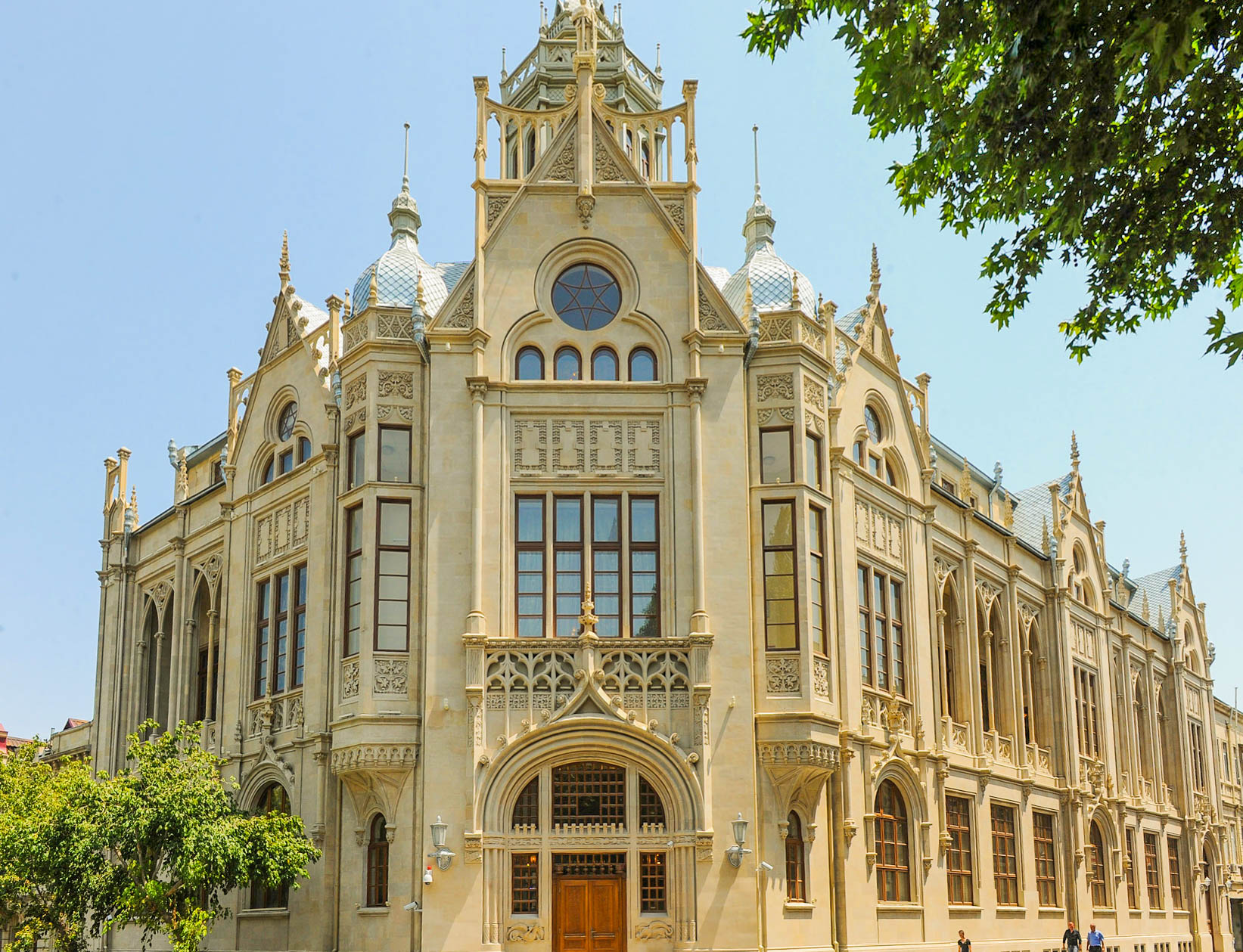
Palace of Happiness

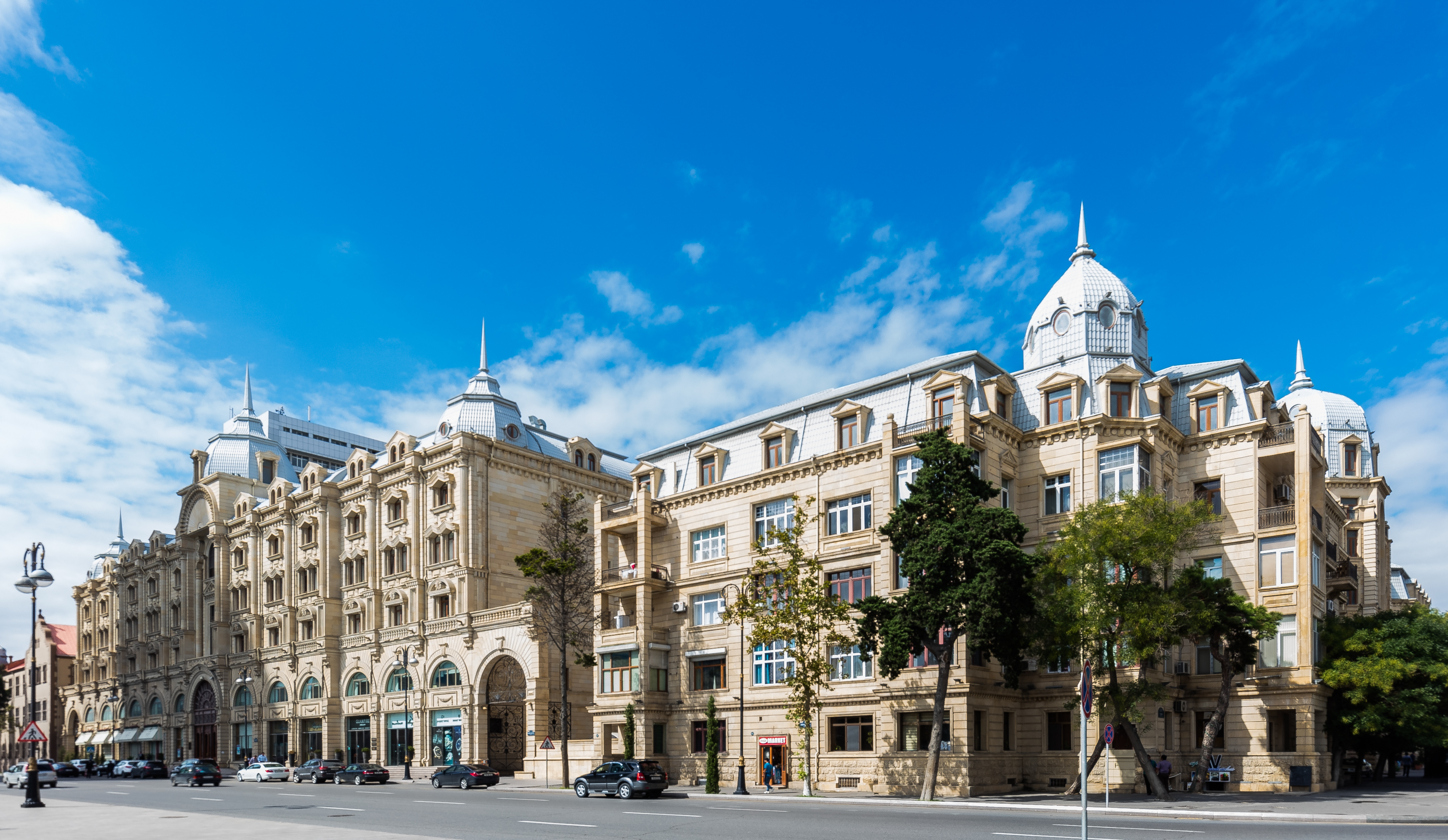
A classical late Russian Empire era buildings

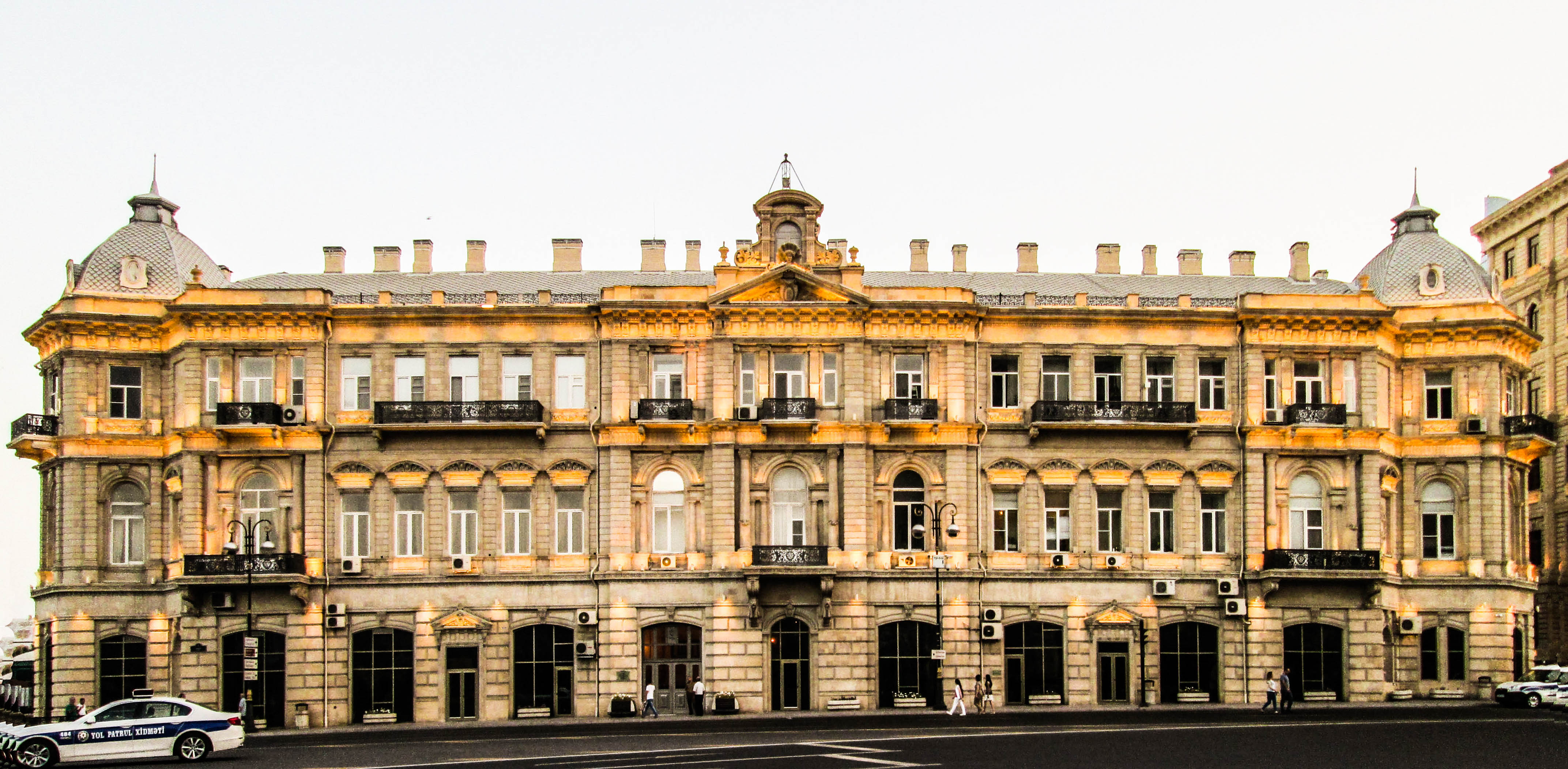
Palace of Seyid Mirbabayev

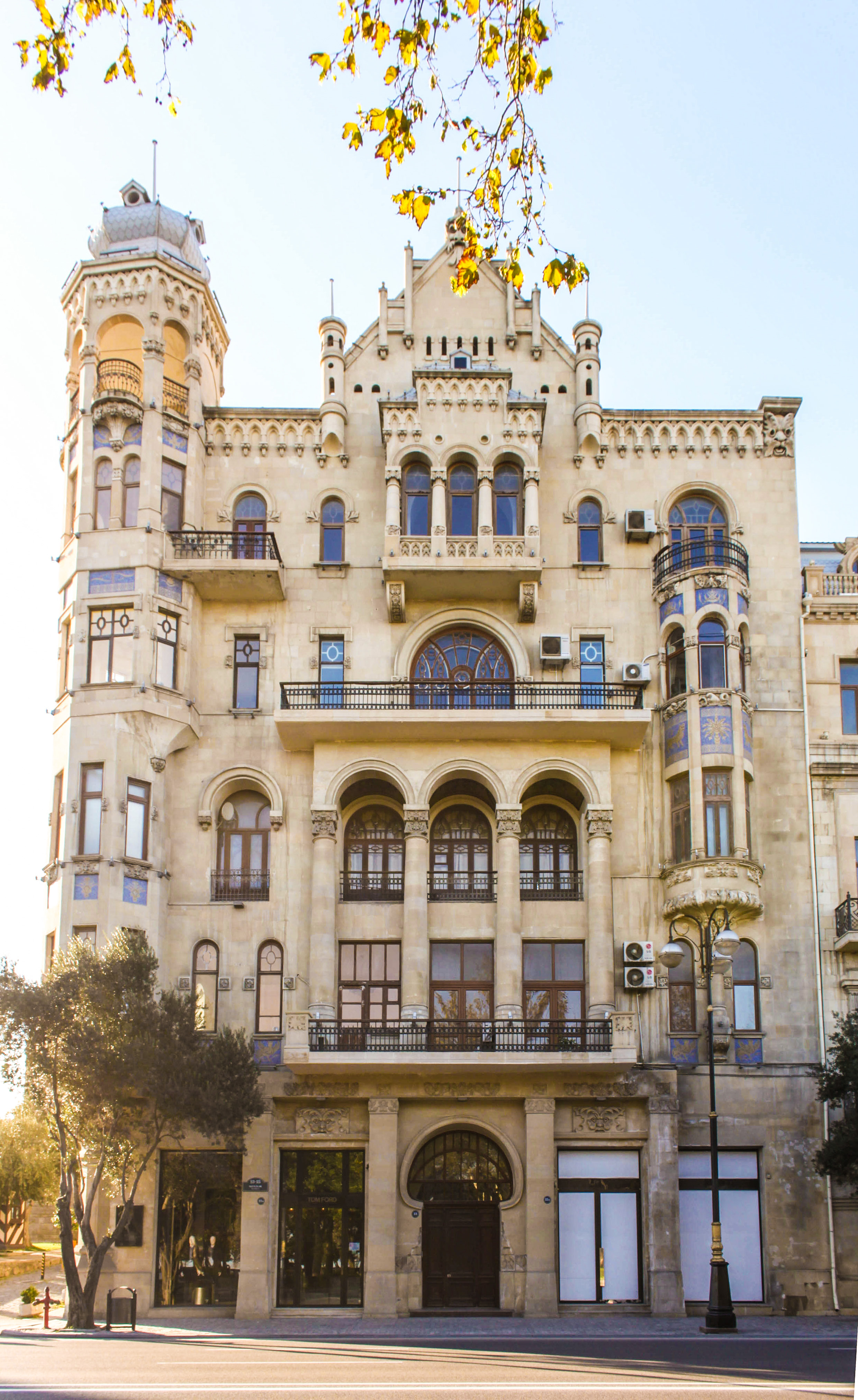
Isa bek Hajinski House

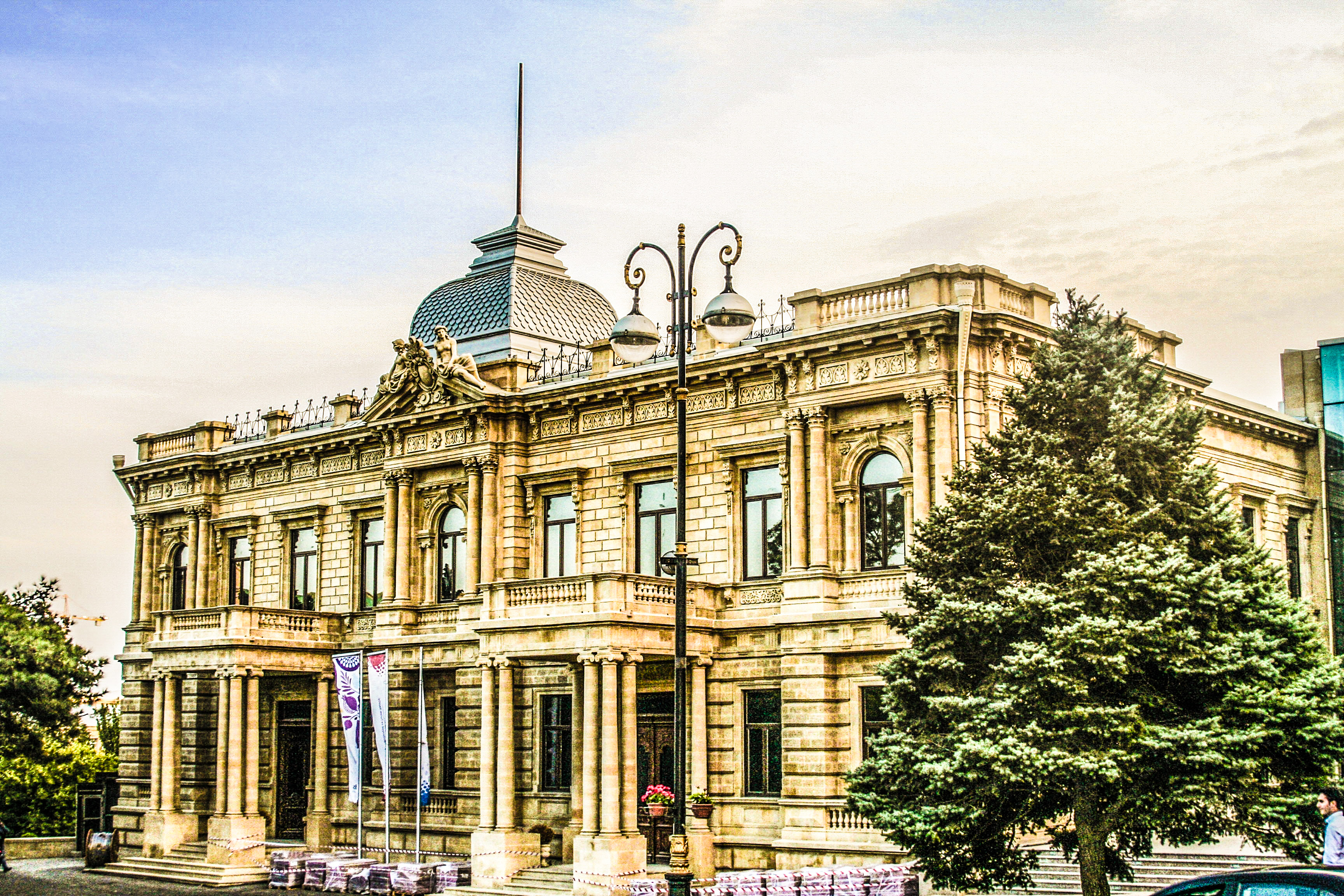
Palace of De Boure

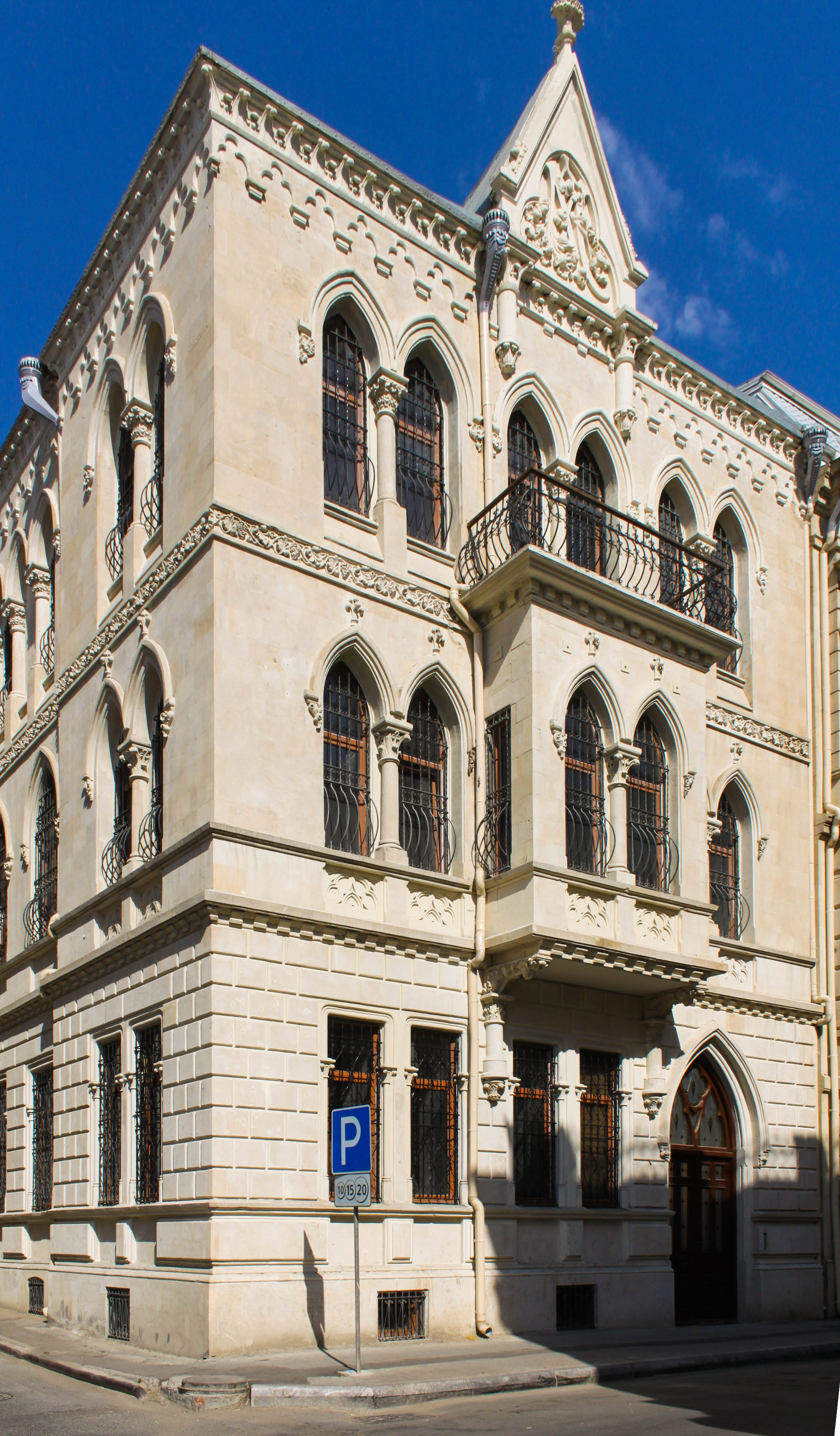
Tigran Melikov's House

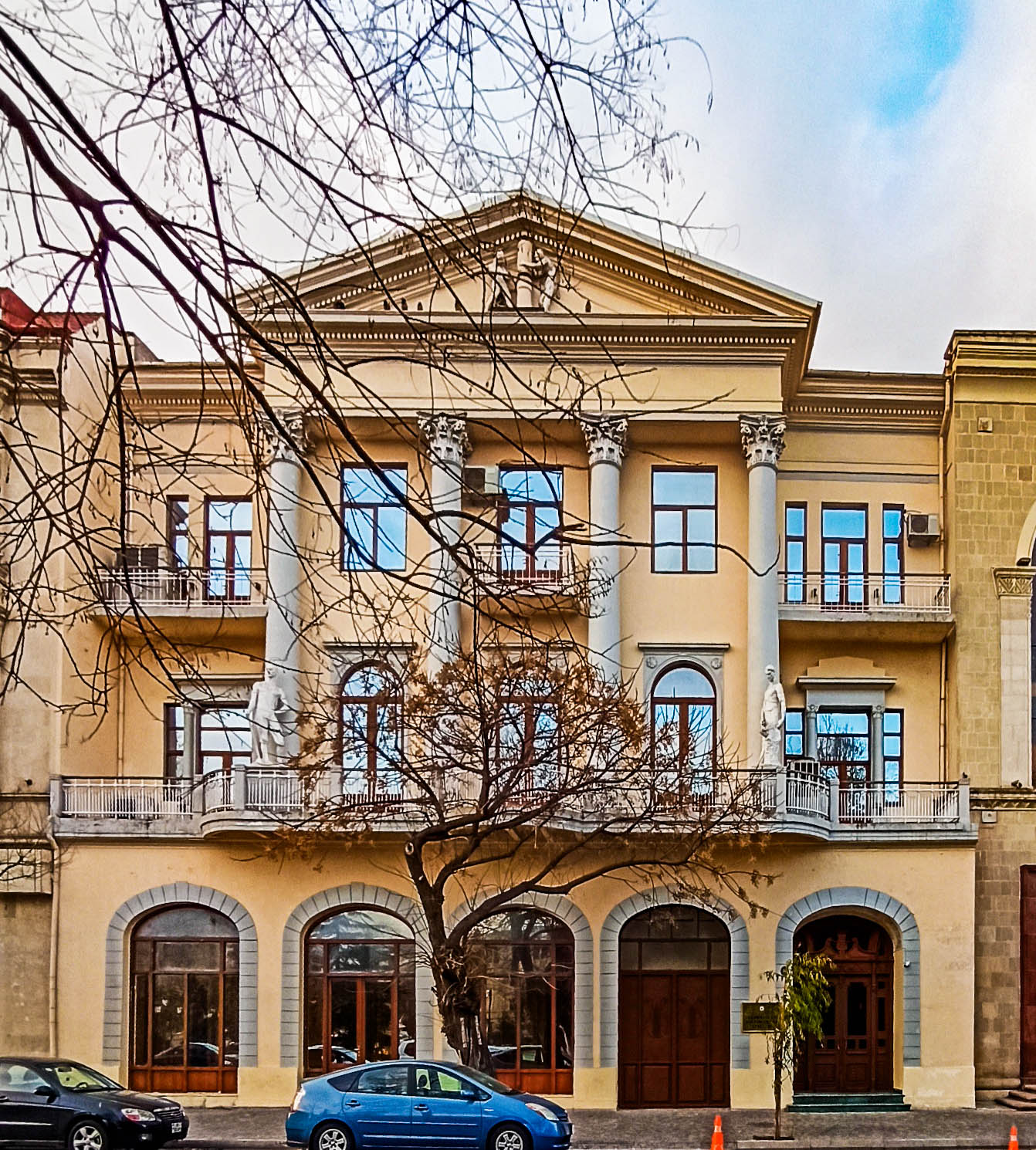
Sabir Central City Library

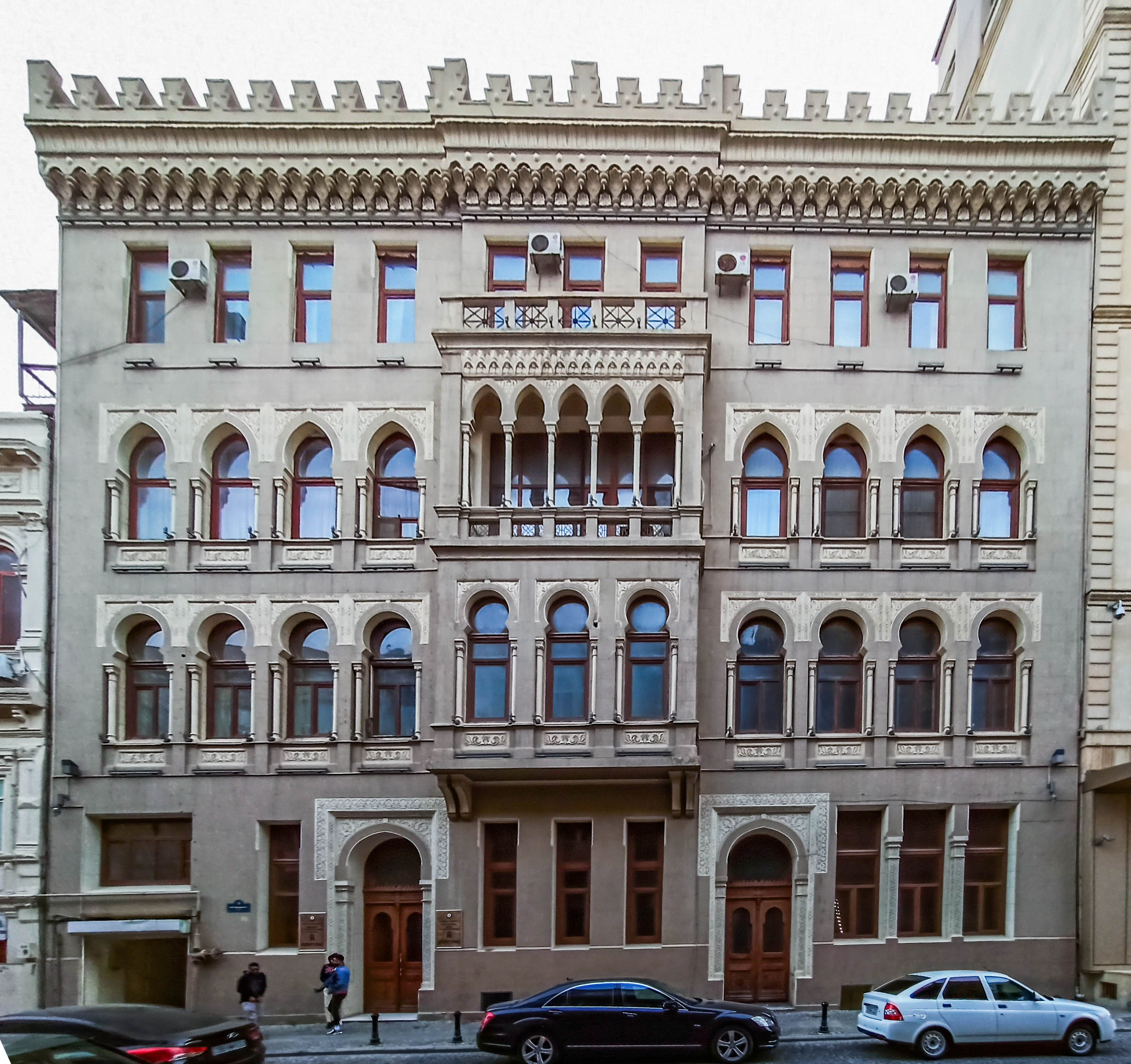
Rylsky brothers' house

== Soviet period ==
USSR Council of Ministers' resolution "On measures to further industrialization, improving quality and reducing the cost of construction" and "The removal of excess in the design and construction" in the mid-1950s has helped to initiate mass housing in Baku.

The architectural image of the country's capital was enriched by a number of interesting in conception projects and highly significant in terms of urban sites, such as the building of the historical Ismailiyya Palace, which nowadays is the office of the Presidium of National Academy of Sciences of Azerbaijan, the Lenin Palace (now the Heydar Aliyev Palace), as well as marine and railway stations.

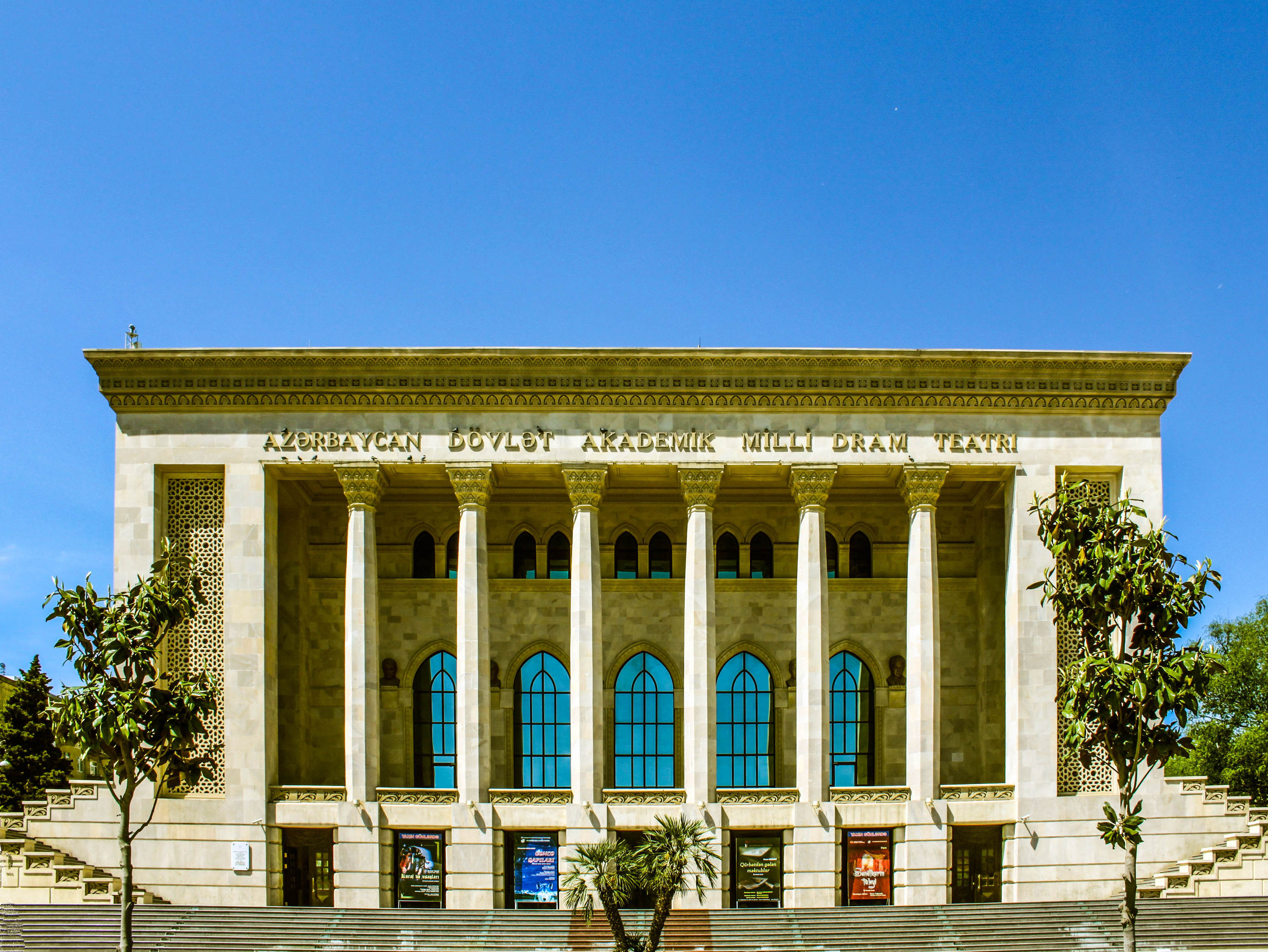
Azerbaijan State Academic Drama Theatre

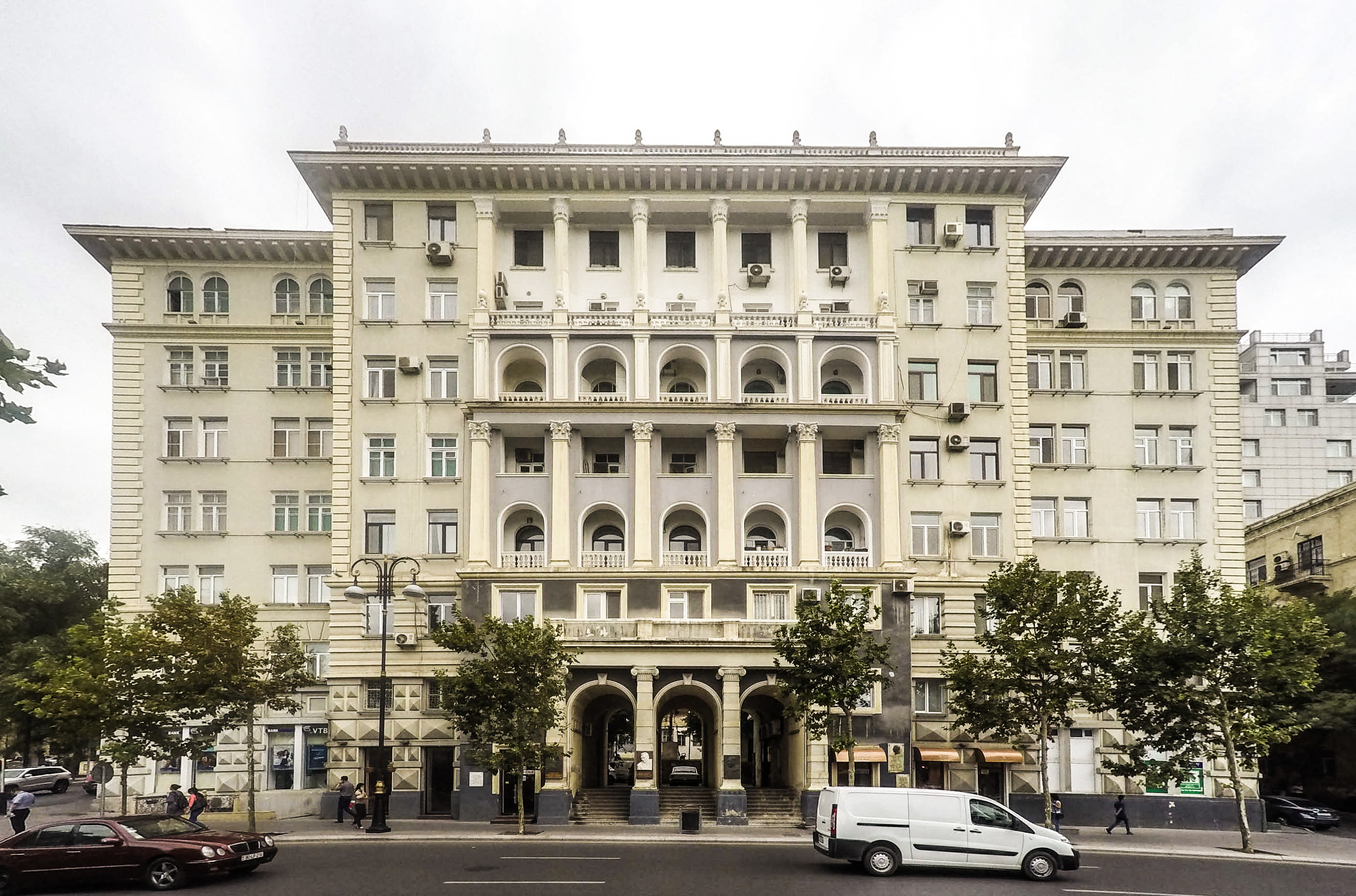
An apartment building "Monolit" in the Stalinist architecture

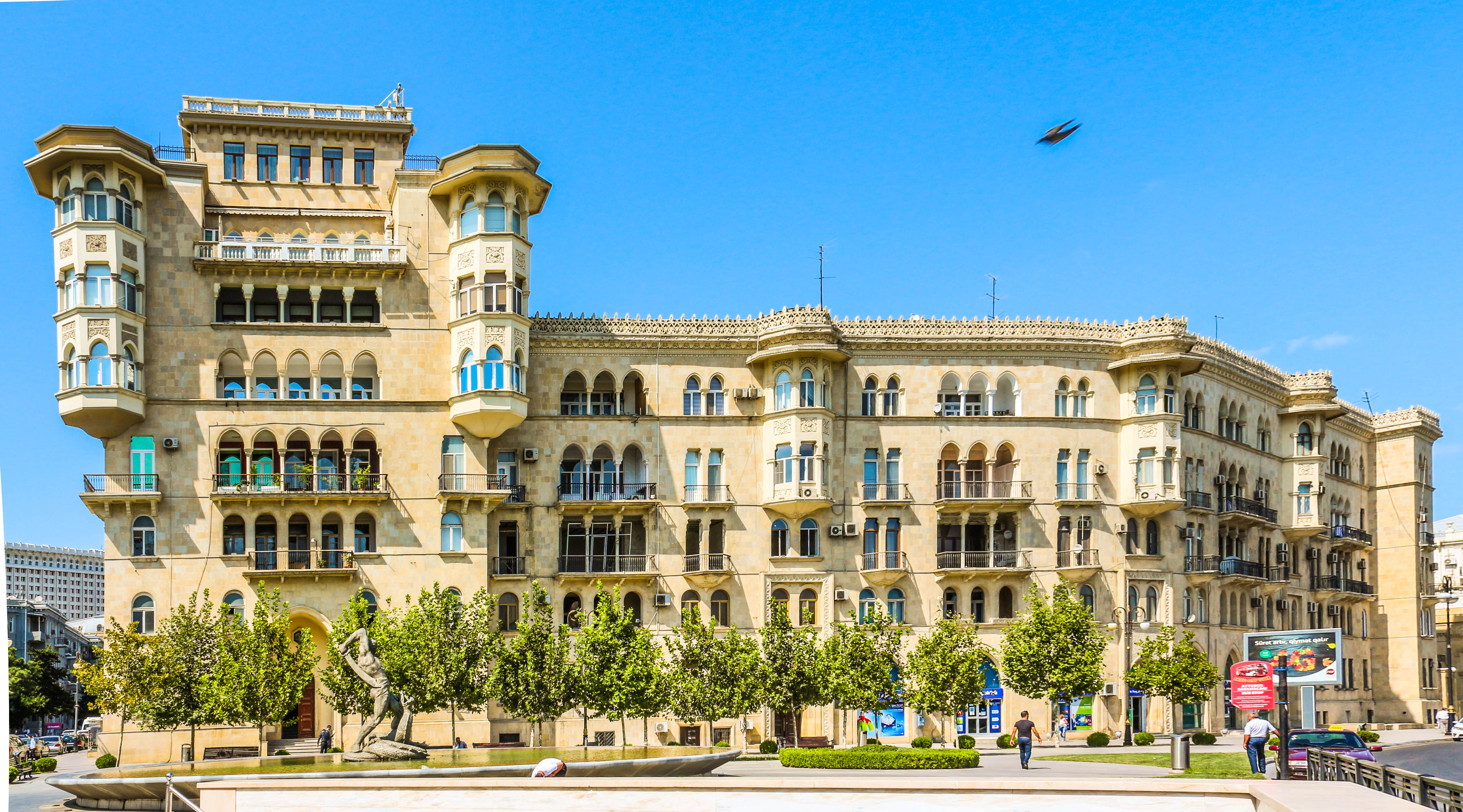
Residential building of scientists

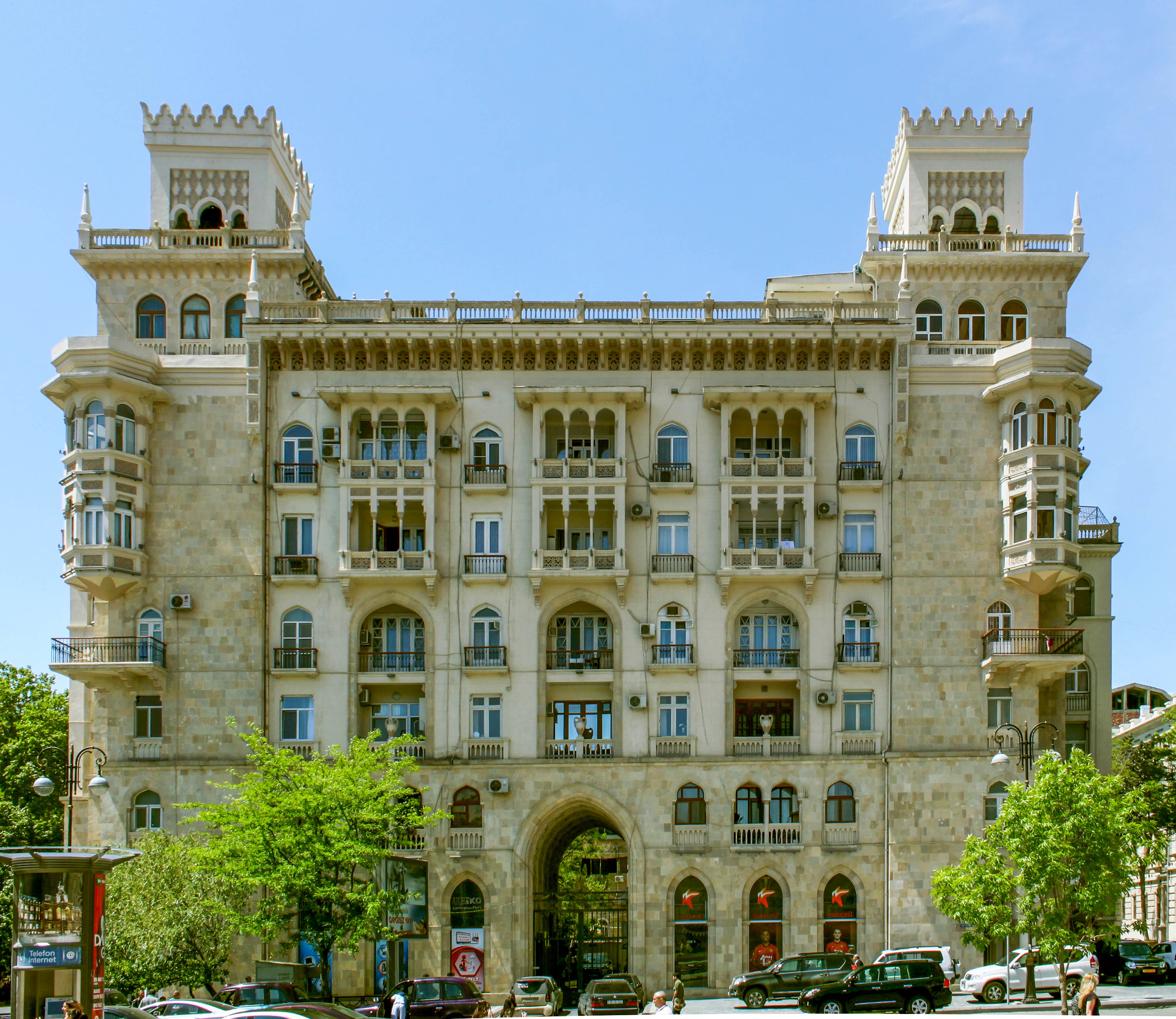
Buzovnaneft building

Government House

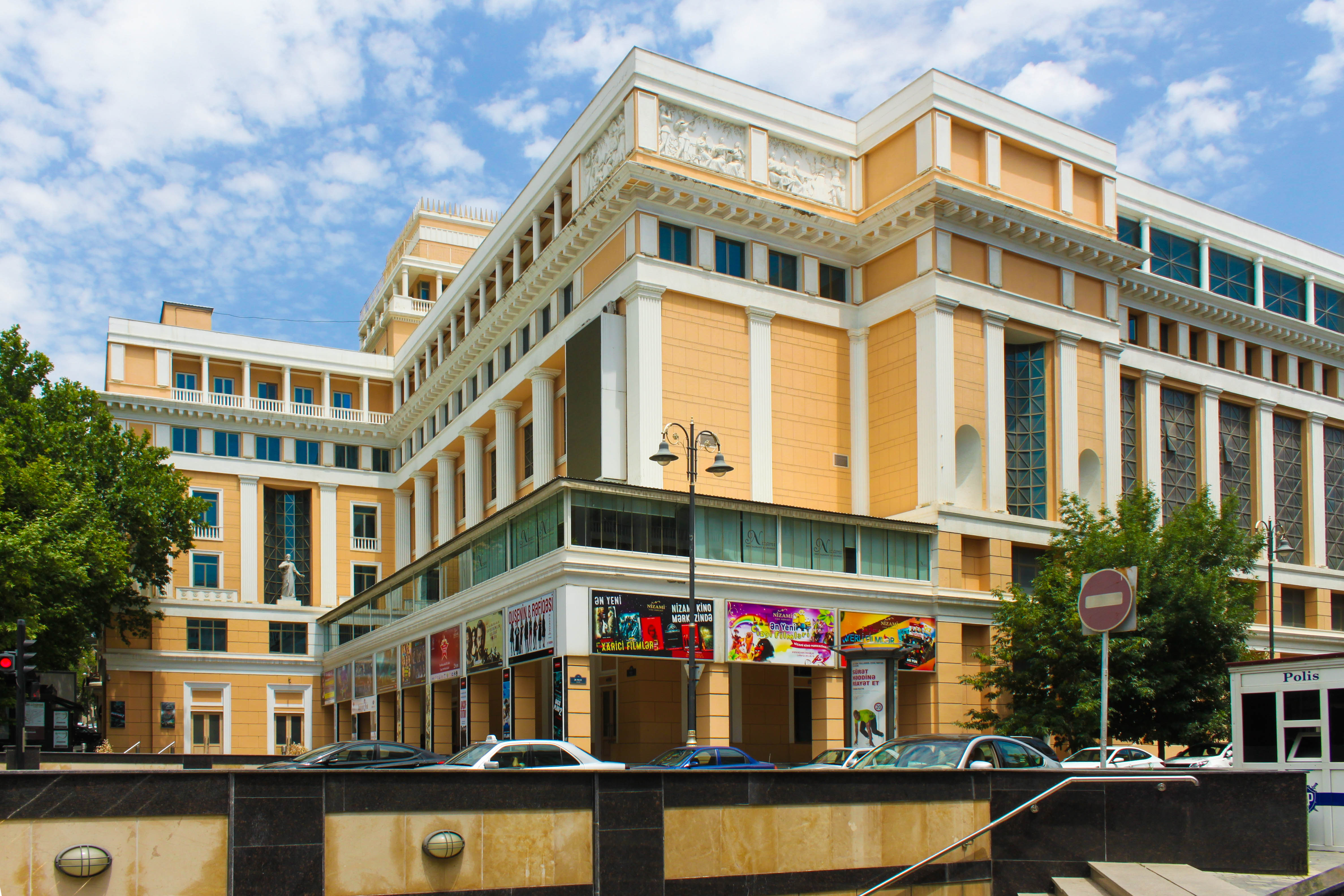
Nizami Cinema Center

Intourist Hotel, architect Alexey Shchusev

Heydar Aliyev Sports and Concert Complex

Gulustan Palace

== Post-Soviet and present day ==
Baku’s new business districts today has shifted around the Baku city center, with many high-tech buildings and postmodern architecture. Aside from buildings used for business and institutions, various new residential developments are currently underway, many of which consist of high-rise buildings with a glass exterior, surrounded by American-style residential communities.

Baku Crystal Hall

Baku Convention Center

Aquatic Palace

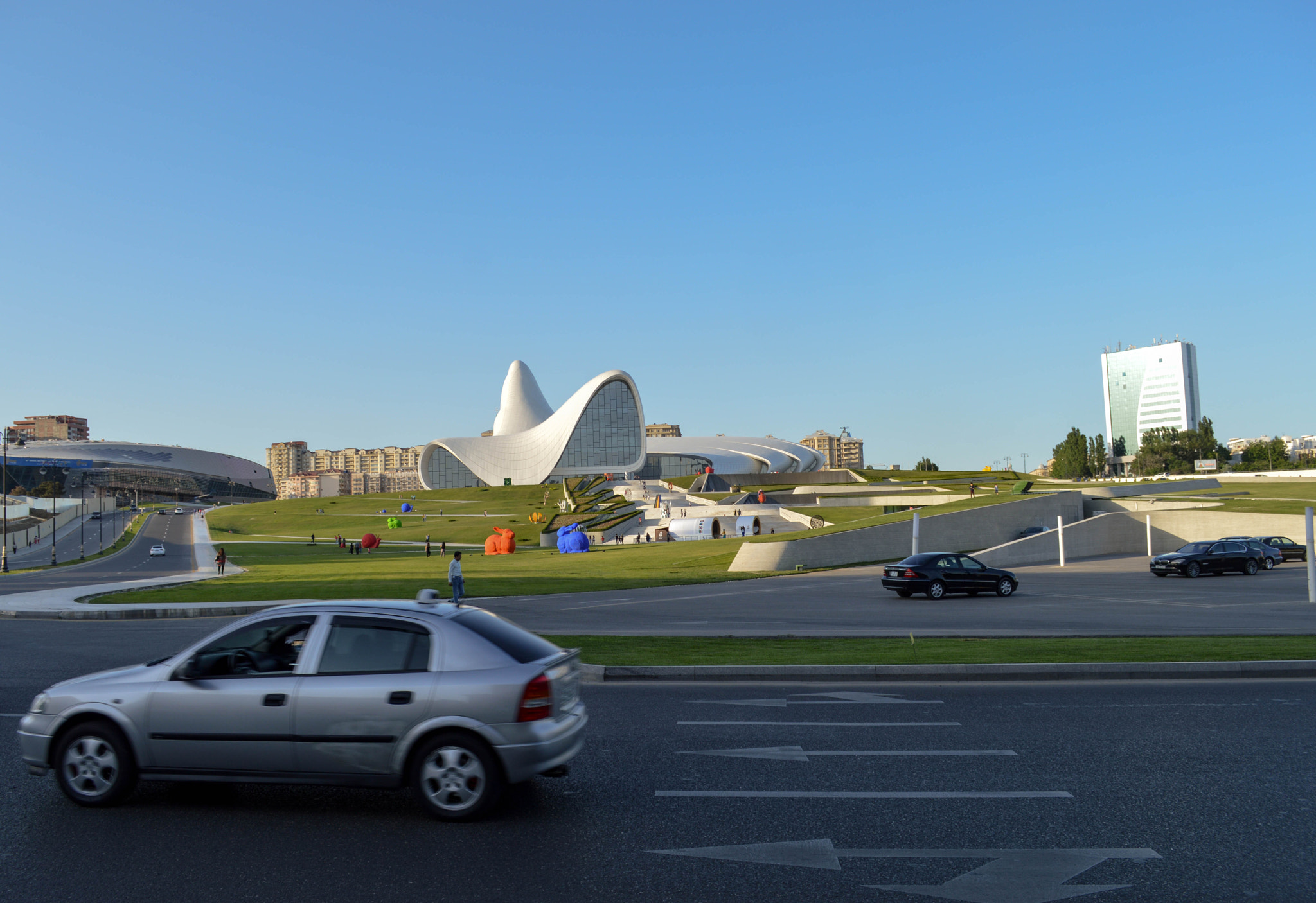
Heydar Aliyev Center

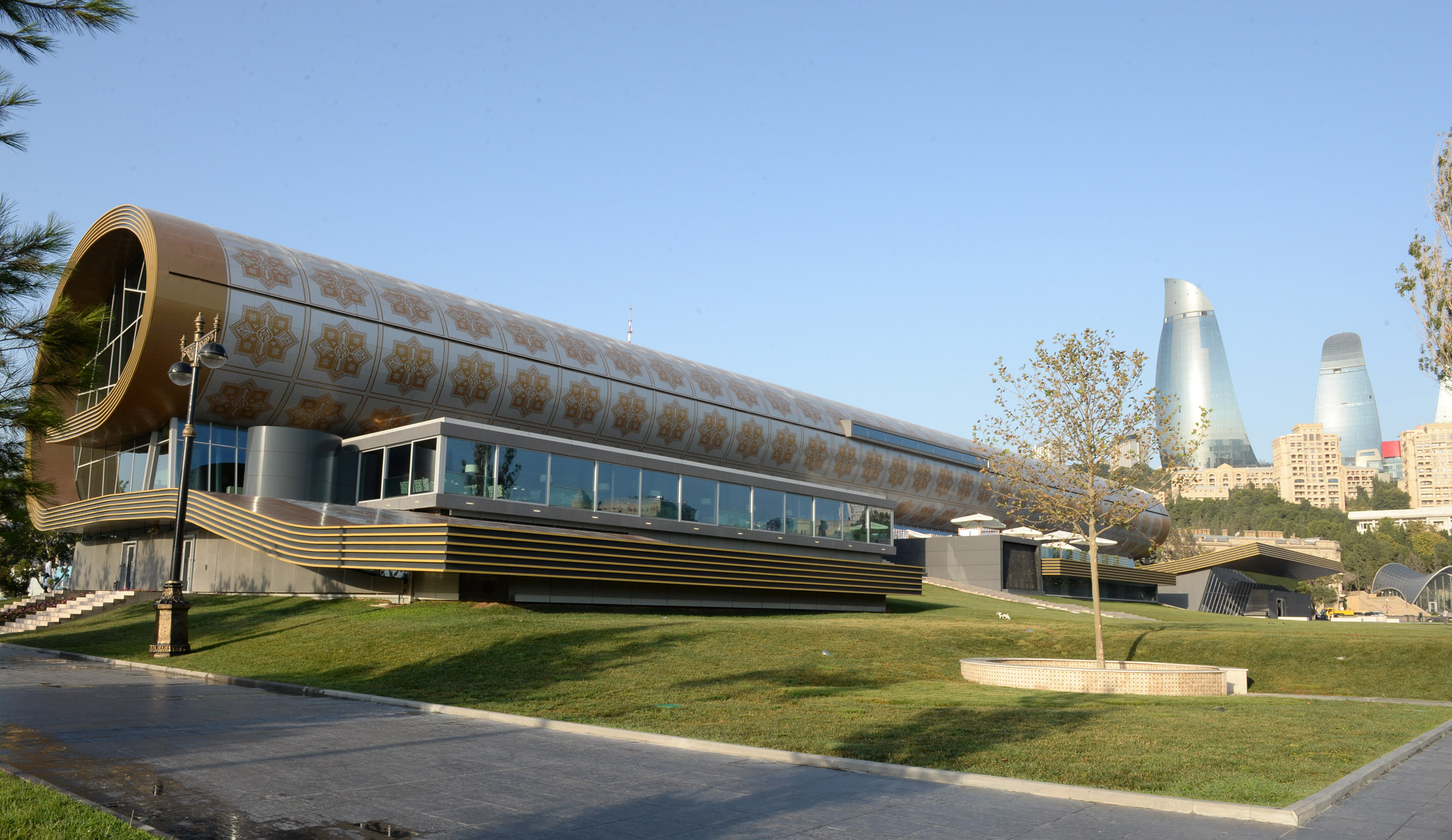
Azerbaijan Carpet Museum

The SOCAR Tower

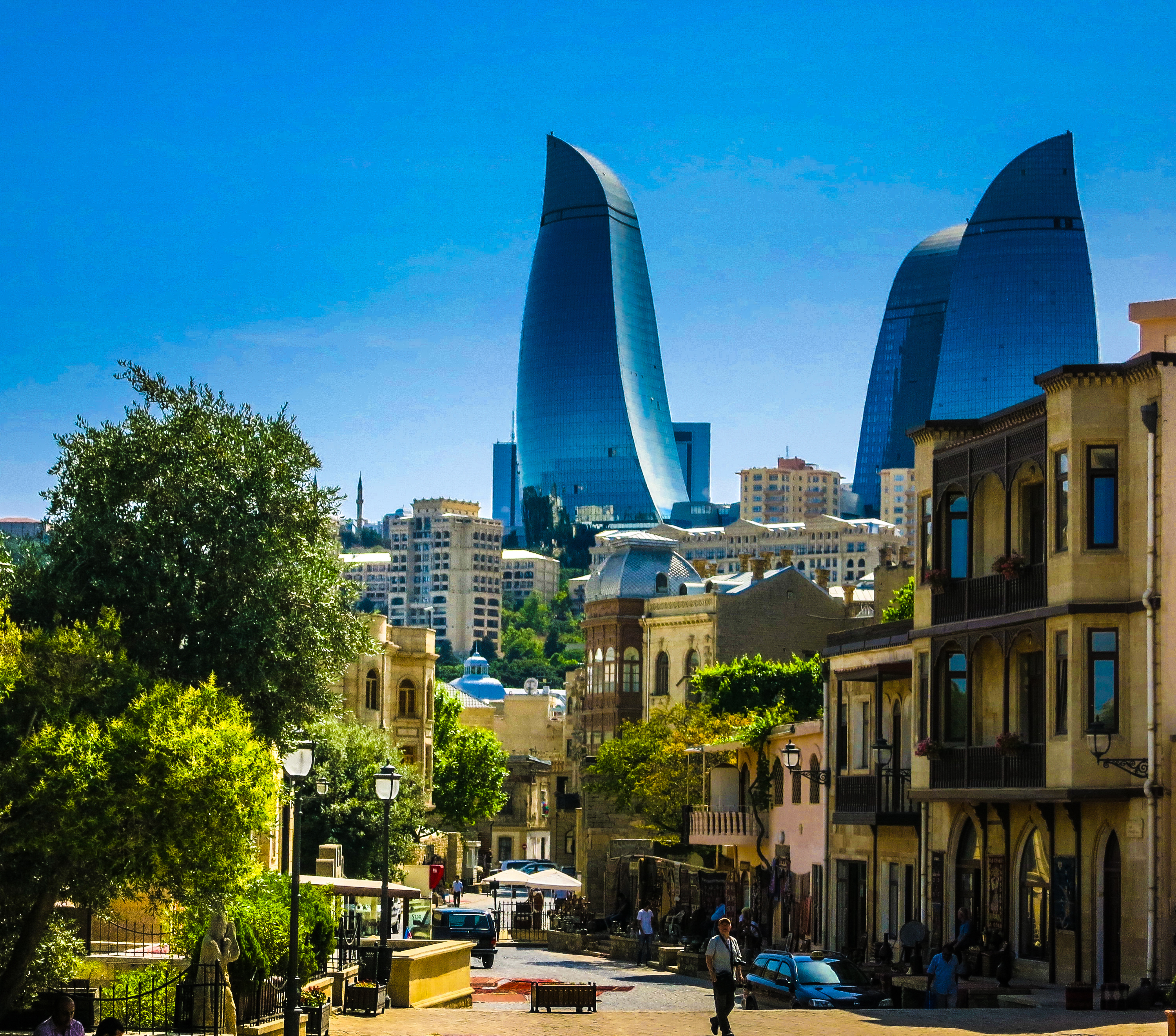
The Flame Towers

The Azersu Tower

Marine Plaza

The Port Baku Towers

== List of architects in Baku ==
The architects of Baku have influenced the city's architecture throughout its development during the 19th and 20th centuries.

=== History ===
The names of numerous medieval architects of Baku are depicted on their buildings. One can mention the names of Masud ibn Davud, who designed Maiden Tower, his son Abdul-Majid Masud oglu, the author of the project of Sabayil Castle and Round Castle in Mardakan, Mahmud ibn Sa'd, who built Bibi-Heybat Mosque, Nardaran Fortress and Molla Ahmad Mosque in Baku's Old City, etc.

Due to the oil boom in the 19th century, Baku became a rapidly developing city and grew rapidly. The large-scale construction of the city was directly tied to the increase of the city's population. Eventually, this brought numerous Armenian, Azerbaijani, German (Adolf Eichler and Nicolaus von der Nonne), Polish (Józef Gosławski and Józef Płoszko) and Russian architects to the city, who ultimately influenced the city's architectural profile. Much of these architects were educated in Russia and, in particular, in St. Petersburg, Russia's capital city of the time. These included a number of high-profile designers, such as Freidun Aghalyan, Zivar bey Ahmadbeyov, Nikolai Bayev, Mammad Hasan Hajinski, and Hovhannes Katchaznouni. From 1860 till 1868, Gasim bey Hajibababeyov was considered the chief architect of Baku.

Architects during the Soviet period include Mikayil Huseynov, Sadig Dadashov, Lev Ilyin, Lev Rudnev etc. In Baku also worked architects Hasan Majidov, who designed the building of Museum center, Talaat Khanlarov, the author of Heydar Aliyev Sports and Exhibition Complex, Anvar Qasimzade, who designed the building of the Oil and Gas Research and Design Institute (1956) and Ulduz metro station.

=== Architects ===
Architect	Biography	Works
	Born Shusha, Karabakh November 20, 1876 – died Yerevan, Armenia SSR February 1, 1944. Of Armenian descent, in 1903 Aghalyan finished the St. Petersburg Institute of Civil Engineering.	In 1903–1921 he constructed railroad bridges, gymnasium, the Treasury palace and Workers House.
Zivar bey Ahmadbeyov	Born Shamakhy, Azerbaijan 1873 - died 1925, Baku. In 1902, Zivar bey Ahmadbeyov graduated from Saint-Petersburg State University of Architecture and Civil Engineering. From this year to 1917, Ahmadbeyov worked as an architect in Baku Governorate, then in Baku City Council. After the establishment of the Azerbaijan Democratic Republic, Ahmadbeyov became the chief architect of Baku and held this post until 1922.	Two of the largest mosques in Baku, the Baku-Blue Mosque and Taza Pir Mosque were constructed (1905-1914) according to the projects of Ahmadbeyov. Murtuza Mukhtarov Mosque, Saadet School (1912-1913), Ittifak Mosque (1911-1913), Hospital Pavilion, three houses on the yard of Mikhaylovskaya hospital (1912), corpus of Mikhaylovskaya hospital on Balakhanskaya 31 (1912-1913; now Fizuli Street), Children hospital on Persidskaya Street (1914-1918; now Mukhtarov Street), House on the 6th Park Lane 1 (1914-1916).
Nikolai Bayev	Born Astrakhan, Russia October 6, 1875 – died August 5, 1952, Yerevan, Armenia SSR. Of Armenian descent, Bayev was educated at the St. Petersburg Institute of Civil Engineering. From 1911–1918 he worked as Major Engineer of Baku.	Constructed more than 100 buildings in Baku, including the Great Theatre of the Mayilyan Brothers (modern days Azerbaijan State Opera Theatre, 1911), Baku Northern Savings Bank, Sabunchi Railway Station, a neighborhood in the former Ermenikend area of Baku, series of schools, gymnasiums, Semashko Hospital (1914–18), residences of Salmanov, Sheremetiev, and others.
Konstantin Borisoglebskiy	Born on October 16, 1861, in Moscow Gubernia. Graduated St. Petersburg University of Civil Engineering	Olginskaya rows - four-stored building on Olginskaya Street 5 (now Rasulzade Street; 1910-1912), building of the Gymnasium on Balakhanskaya Street (now the building of hospital on Fizuli Street 61) built in 1913
Mikhail Botov	Born 1855 - died 1886. Graduated St. Petersburg University of Civil Engineering in 1881.	Mariinskaya Gymnasium (now the second building of the National Art Museum of Azerbaijan; 1883–85), Muslim bath (1884), Aleksandrovskaya baths (1884; not preserved), two one-storied houses (1883)
Dmitriy Buynov	Born 1859. Graduated St. Petersburg University of Civil Engineering in 1884. He worked a long time in construction department of Baku Gubernia administration.	Two-storied house (1888), the building of Saint Nina's School (now School №132 on Istiglaliyyat Street), the building of Real school (now the building of Azerbaijan State Economic University on Istiglaliyyat Street).
Sadig Dadashov	Born on April 2 (15), 1905 in Baku. In 1929, he graduated from Azerbaijan State Oil Academy (afterwards he became its professor). He was the author of books about the architecture of Azerbaijan. He was a full member of the Academy of Sciences of the Azerbaijan SSR (1945). Sadiq Dadashov worked in close cooperation with M.A.Huseynov. He developed progressive traditions of Azerbaijani architecture creatively. Dadashov died in Moscow, on December 24, 1946.	He erected many residential and public buildings in Baku and in other cities of Azerbaijan. Cinema named after Nizami (1934), Nizami Museum of Azerbaijani Literature, building of the Central Committee of the Communist Party of the Azerbaijan SSR (1938-1939), building of Baku Academy of Music are his famous projects.
Adolf Eichler	Born November 8, 1869 — died 1911. He was a German civil architect.	Eichler is best known for building the Saviour's Church (at the age of 24) and participating in boulevard development, both in Baku.
Józef Gosławski	Born in Congress Poland to a noble Polish family. In 1891, he graduated from the Institute of Civil Engineering in Saint Petersburg, and a year later he was appointed chief architect of the city of Baku (present-day capital of Azerbaijan). His first task was to assist the local architect Robert Marfeld in designing and supervising the	Alexander Nevsky Cathedral, Taghiyev Residence (present-day Azerbaijan State Museum of History), the Empress Alexandra Russian Muslim Boarding School for Girls (present-day Fuzuli Institute of Manuscripts of the National Academy of Sciences of Azerbaijan), City Duma (present-day Baku City Hall), and a number of industrial buildings and houses.
Gasim bey Hajibababeyov	Born in 1812, in Sarytorpaq village of Shamakhi. He got his primary education at mollah. His father and elder brother Semed bey also were architects. Gasim bey was the first among the Caucasians who worked in governmental and public organizations in the sphere of architecture and urban planning. From 1848, he worked as an assistant of a province architect of Shamakhi. In 1856, he became the architect of Shamakhi province. Since 1860 till 1868, he became the chief architect of Baku and from 1868 till the end of his life was the chief architect of Shamakhi.	Baku Boulevard – 1860-1861, Tsitsianov square – 1860, Two-storeyed caravanserai – 1860s (At present - Nizami Museum of Azerbaijani Literature), Two-storeyed caravanserai – 1870s (Vorontsovskaya Street 1, now - Safarli Street), Residential houses in Krivaya street (now - Fountain Square) – 1870s, Building of "Araz" cinema, Fountains square
Mammad Hasan Hajinski	Hajinski was born on March 3, 1875. He graduated from Baku Realny School and then St. Petersburg Technical School in 1902 with an engineering degree. He worked at construction of a Russian oil refinery being built by Azerbaijani businessman Shamsi Asadullayev before he moved back to Azerbaijan and was appointed the director of construction department of Baku municipality. One of notable designers employed by Hajinski was Adolf Eichler	During the time Hajinski held the position of the director of construction department of Baku municipality, he made significant contributions to architectural improvements of Baku. Under his management, construction of Baku Seaside Boulevard gained a new impetus in 1910, when at his insistence, the Municipal Parliament passed a bill allocating 60,000 rubles for improvements.
Mikayil Useynov	Huseynov was born on 19 April 1905, in Baku, in a well-off family. His father was a millionaire, had streamships on the Caspian Sea and a great mansion on the seafront. His origination hang over him as the sword of Damocles and he could be arrested at any time. Until 1946, he worked in close creative and scientific cooperation with S.A. Dadashov. He died on October 7, 1992, and was buried in the Alley of Honor in Baku.	Building of the Central Committee of the Communist Party of Azerbaijan, Azerbaijan State Conservatory, Nizami Museum of Azerbaijan Literature in Baku, pavilion of All-Russia Exhibition Centre of Azerbaijan in Moscow (1939 and 1954), group of buildings of the Azerbaijan National Academy of Sciences (1951–1966)
Mashadi Mirza Gafar Ismayilov	Student of Hajibababayov. In 1868 – 1898 years he mainly did private practice. Prolific architect and a great graphic designers.	House in Tazapirskaya Street (1885), two-storied house in Surakhanskaya Street (1886), two-storied house in Kolyubakinskaya Street (1887), two-storied house in Gubernskaya Street (1887), one-storied house in Persidskaya Street (1887), two-storied house in Tazapirskaya Street (1898), two-storied house in Nikolayevskaya Street (1890) etc.
Anton Kandinov		
Hovhannes Katchaznouni	Born 1868 Akhaltsikhe, Georgia – died Soviet Union 1938. Of Armenian descent, he graduated with honors from St. Petersburg Institute of Civil Engineering in 1893. He eventually became the first Prime Minister of Armenia in 1918.	Built a hospital, apartment houses, a hotel in Balakhany, and assisted in the construction of the Saint Thaddeus and Bartholomew Armenian Cathedral.
Talaat Khanlarov	Born 1927. Academician of Academy of Science of Azerbaijan, Honored Architect of Azerbaijan (1975), Vice-President of the International Academy of Architecture of the East.	The building of Heydar Aliyev Sports and Exhibition Complex (with Tahir Abdullayev and Y. Qadimov), Imam Rza mosque in Sabunchi district, mosque in Narimanov district, the building of Memar Əcəmi metro station.
Hasan Majidov		The building of the Museum center.
Nikolaus von der Nonne	Born 1836 — died 1906. He was a German civil architect.	Nikolaus von der Nonne is best known for building the first building of National Art Museum of Azerbaijan in Baku.
Józef Płoszko	Józef Płoszko was born in 1867. He studied at the Russian Imperial Academy of Arts, but soon left it and joined the St. Petersburg University of Civil Engineers. After graduation in 1895, Płoszko was sent to Kiev. Working there for two years, he moved to Baku at the invitation of another Polish architect Józef Goslawski and took place of local architect at construction department of the Baku city administration. He later became the chief architect of Baku.	Ismailiyya building, Catholic Polish church (kostel) in Baku, Catholic Church of Blessed Virgin Mary in Baku, the construction of which was finished in 1912, Palace of Happiness, Kerbalayi Israfil Hajiyev on Shemakhinskaya Street, building of Baku Puppet Theatre (1908), six-storeyed building of “New Europe” hotel on Qoncharovskaya Street (now Taghiyev Street), was the last work of Józef Płoszko before the World War I.
Anvar Gasimzade	Born 1912 – died 1969. Since 1967 he was corresponding member of Academy of Science of Azerbaijan	The building of Oil and Gas Research and Design Institute (1956), the building of Ulduz metro station
Alexander Rotinoff	Worked throughout the Caucasus. Of Armenian descent, in early 20th century, Alexander Rotinoff moved to Great Britain with his family and son – Mikhail Aleksander Rotinoff. Mikhail's son Gabriel Rotinoff founded Rotinoff Motors Ltd. at Colnbrook near Slough in 1952.	Together with Gavriil Ter-Mikelov he assisted in the construction of the Armenian church of Thadeus and Bartholomew in 1901.
Vartan Stepan Sarkisov (Sargsyan)	Born Shusha, Karabakh March 8, 1875 – died Baku, Azerbaijan SSR March 29, 1955. Of Armenian descent, having graduated Realschule in Tbilisi, Sarkisov moved to St. Petersburg and entered the St. Petersburg Institute of Civil Engineering. In 1907 he moved to Baku and immediately received request for a series of projects. His architectural style was modern. Later on in his career, he switched to neoclassicism. Vartan Sarkisov died in Baku on March 29, 1955, and is buried in the Christian-Jewish Nariman Cemetery. In September 2007, the local Azerbaijani government ordered to destroy the Nariman Cemetery.	Constructed the Oil Producers Sanatorium building in Mardakan (1930), a male gymnasium, Residence on Krasnovodskaya street (1908; today Torgovaya (Nizami) Street and Samad Vurghun Avenue intersection; this building is also where Lev Landau was born), reconstructed the Ismailiyya building which was burned during the March Days in 1918, residence of the Mirzabekov brothers in Nikolayevskaya street (1908), and the Residence of Tigran Melikov (Khagani Street, 27).
Eugeniusz Skibiński		
Martin Levon Tovmasyan	Born Martin Yerevan, Armenia SSR, March 5, 1925 – died Yerevan, Armenia 2008. Of Armenian descent, in 1949 he graduated from Azerbaijan Industrial Institute. He was a student of Vartan Sarkisov. He was awarded as Honored Architect of Armenia on May 28, 2007.	Constructed the general layout of the Dyubendi village, 26 Commissars Metro Station (today Sahil station), Reception House and Hotel of Azerbaijan Council of Ministers, Green Theatre, and assisted in the construction of the Lenin Palace (Today Heydar Aliyev Palace).
Gavril Mikhaylovich Ter-Mikelov (Gabriel Ter-Mikaelian)	Born Stavropol, Russia April 16, 1874 – died Tbilisi, Georgia SSR January 14, 1949. Of Armenian descent, in 1893 he studied at the St. Petersburg Institute of Civil Engineering. He graduated the institute in 1899. He moved to Baku where he lived and worked till 1912. He died January 14, 1949, and is buried in the Armenian Vera Cemetery in Tbilisi.	Designed Baku Public Club Building (today Azerbaijan State Philharmonic Hall), the maternity hospital (1899), the building of the Baku branch of the Tiflis Trade Bank (1902–1903; today “Children's World” department store), the Adamoff Brothers residence, the Sadikhov Residence (1910–1912; Nikolaev street house number 1; SSR number 21), Physiotherapy Institute, Four-storey Apartment ordered by Taghiyev (Nizam 30, crossroads with Mariinskaya Street), and the Commercial College (1905–1913; Merkurevskaya Street 39). He was also one of the main architects of the Saint Thaddeus and Bartholomew Armenian Cathedral.
Nikanor Tverdokhlebov		

== Gallery ==
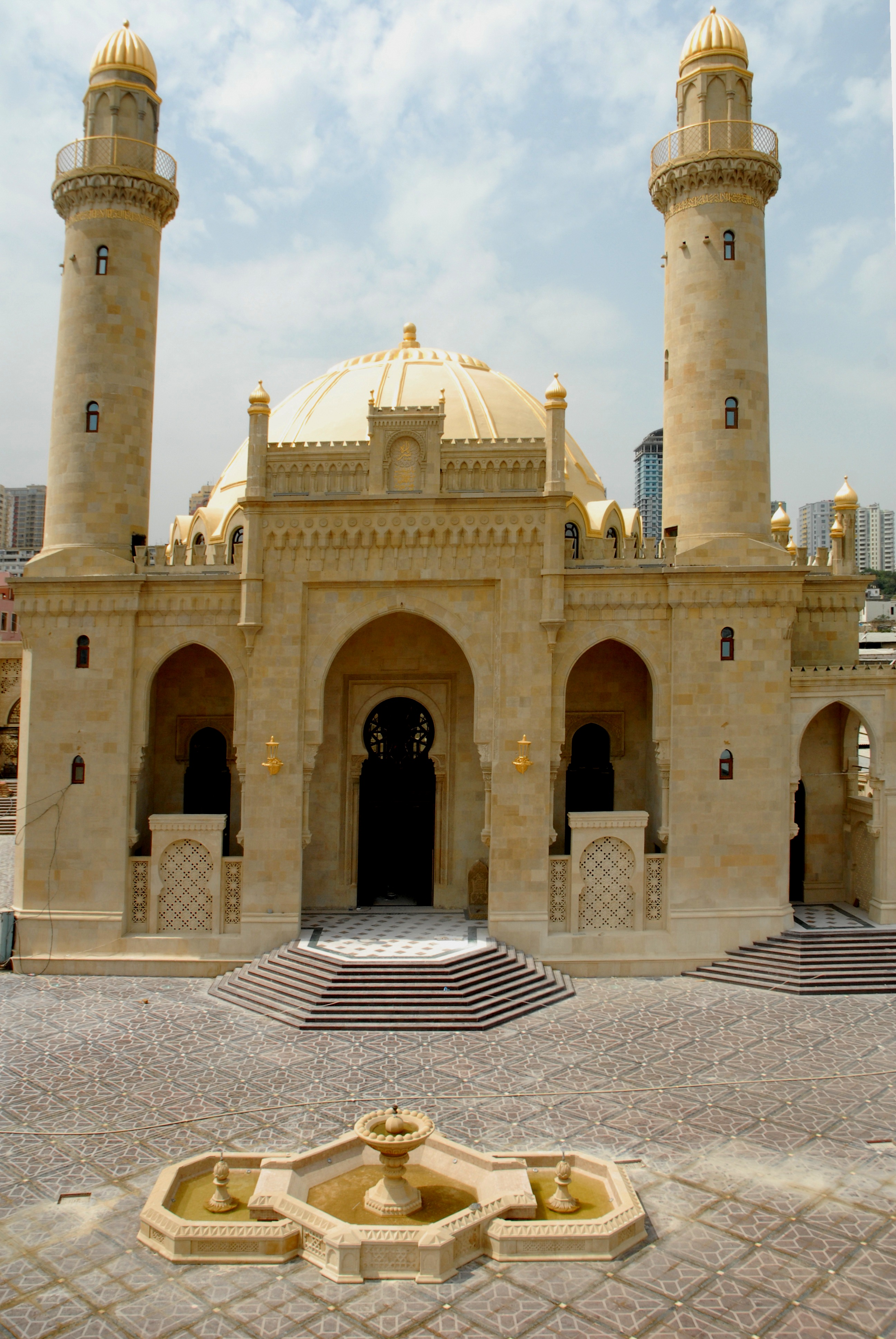
Taza Pir Mosque. Built by Zivar bey Ahmadbeyov (1905-1908)

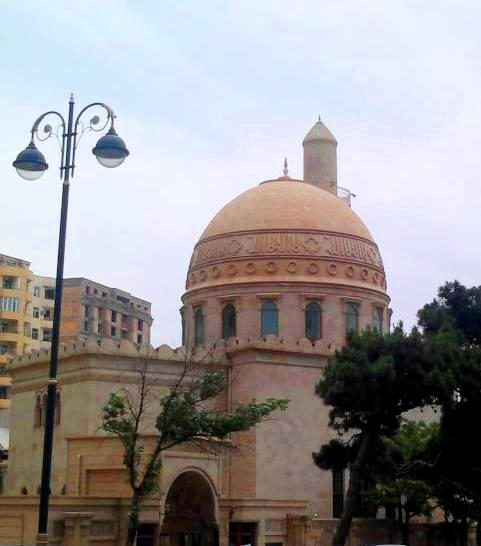
Ajdarbey Mosque. Built by Zivar bey Ahmadbeyov (1912-1913)

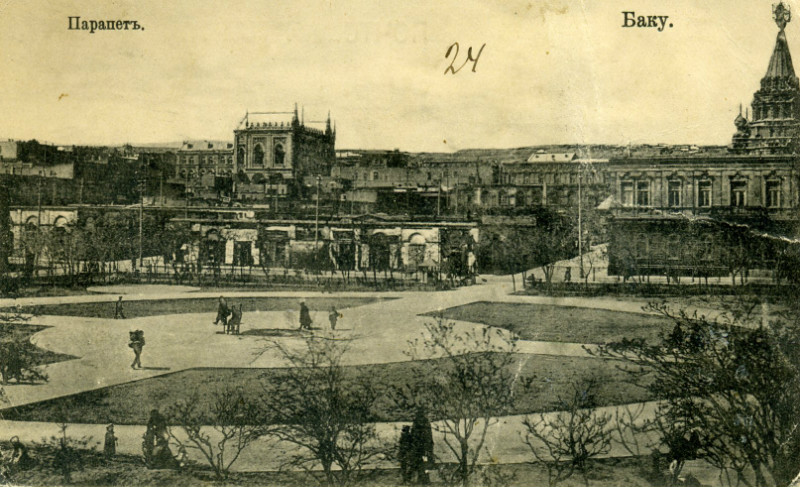
Parapet Square designed by Gasim bey Hajibababeyov

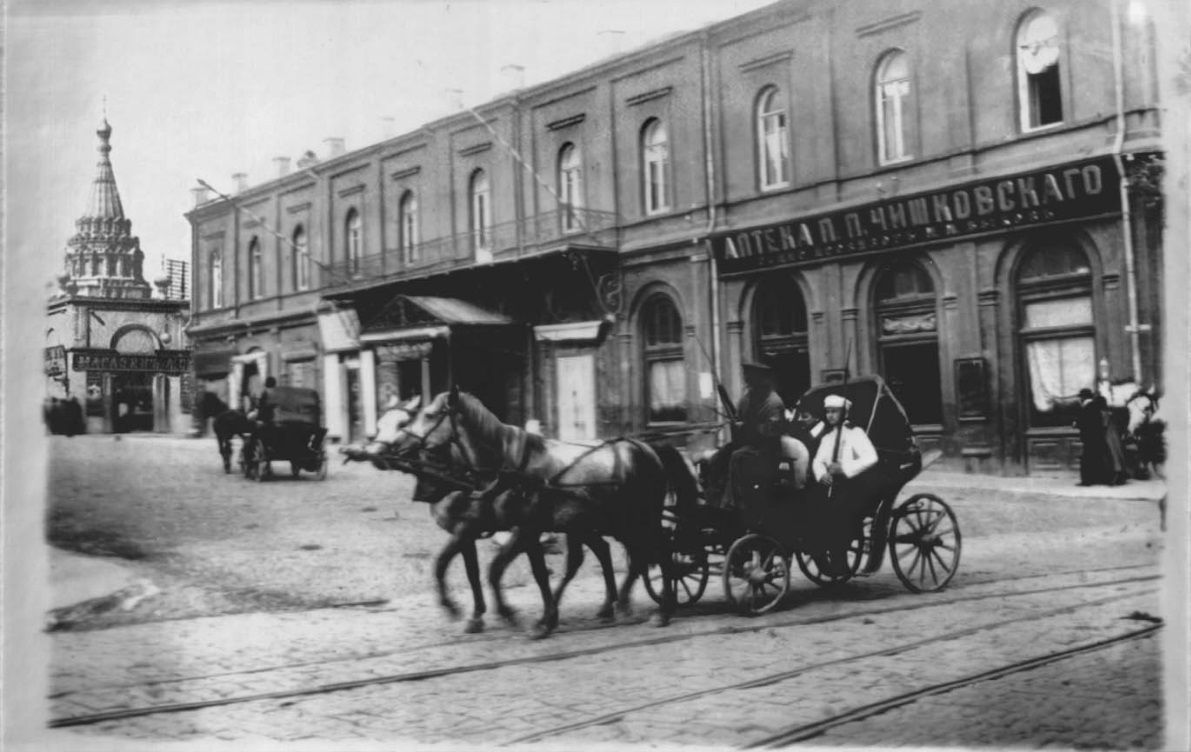
Two-storeyed caravanserai. Built by Gasim bey Hajibababeyov

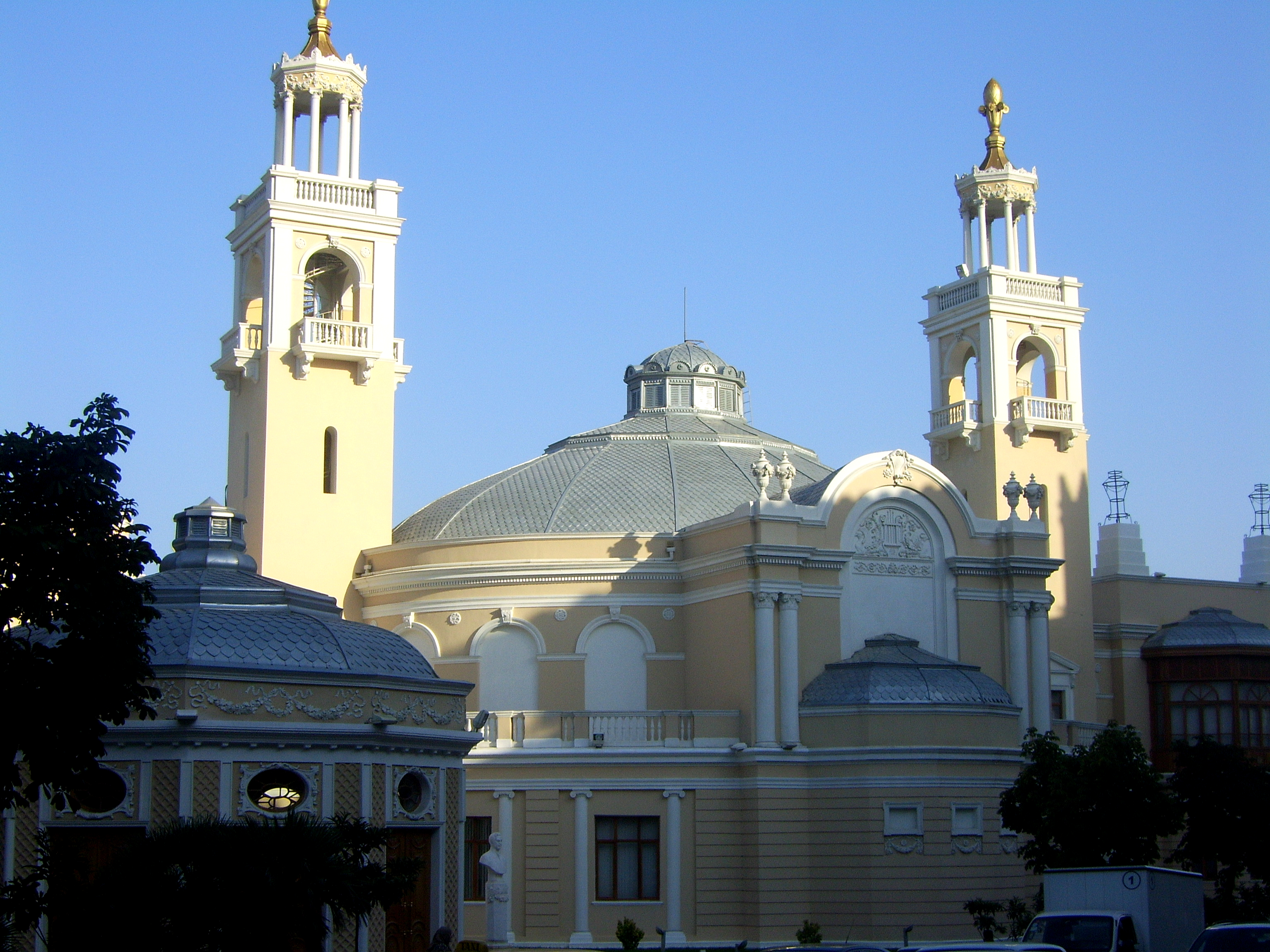
Azerbaijan State Philharmonic Hall constructed by Gavriil Ter-Mikelov.

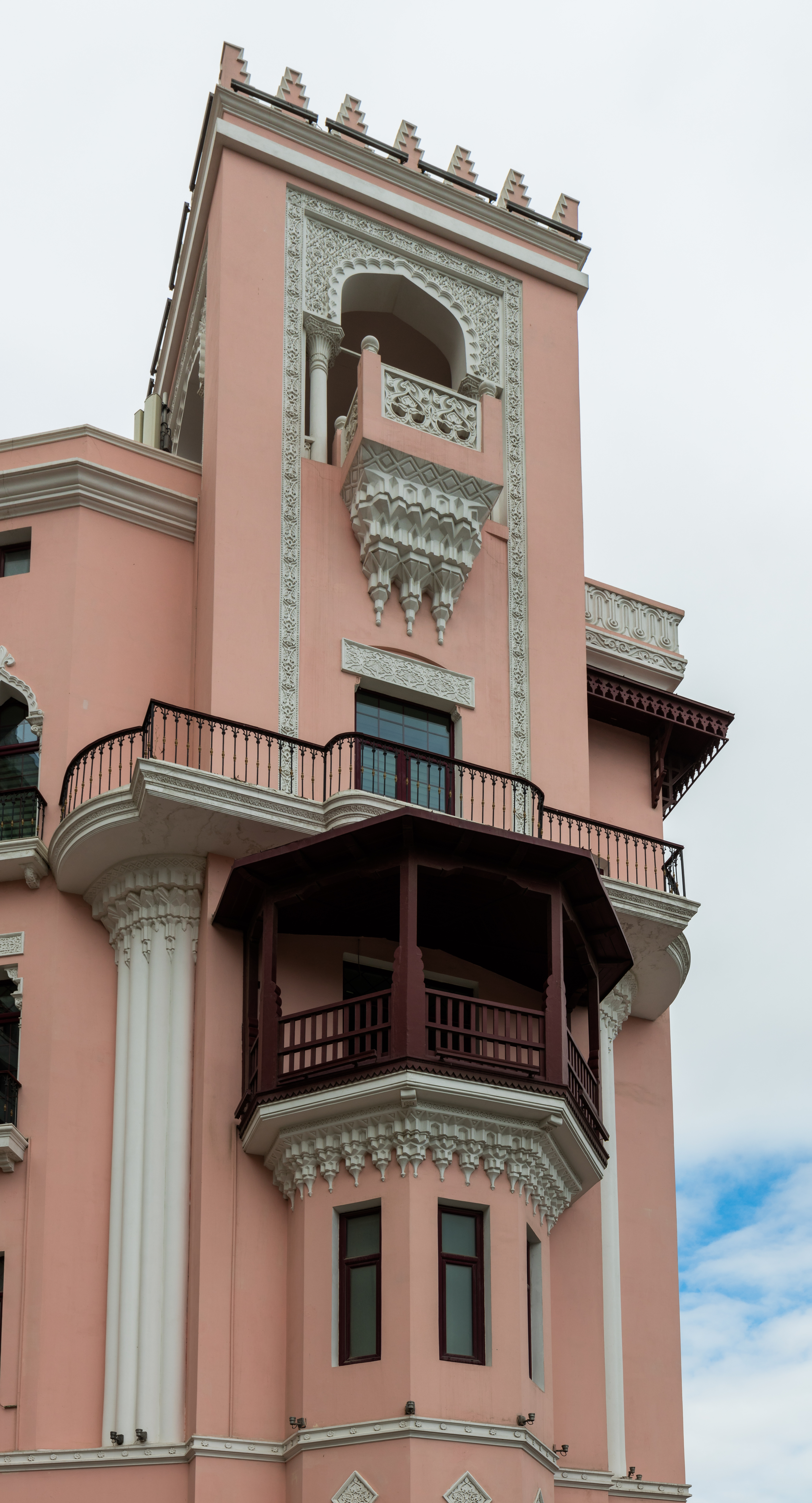
Sadikhov Residence in Baku (1910–1912) designed by Gavriil Ter-Mikelov.

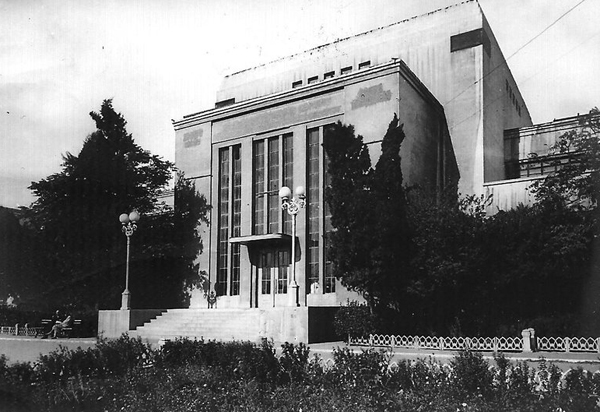
Physiotherapy Institute of Baku designed by Gavriil Ter-Mikelov (1929)

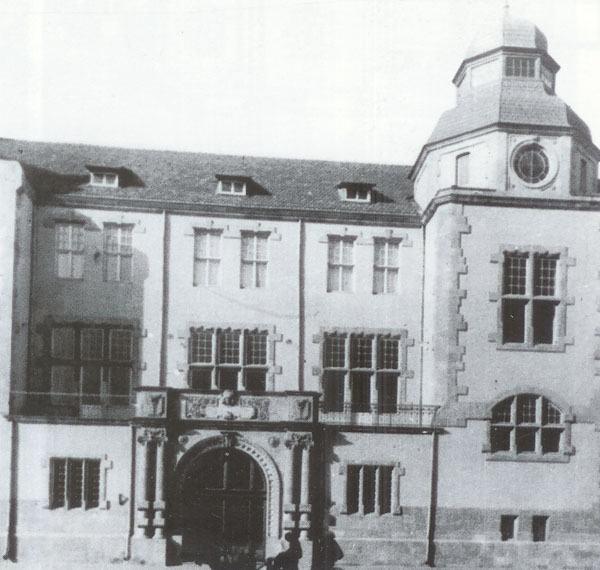
Commercial College of Baku designed by Gavriil Ter-Mikelov (1913)

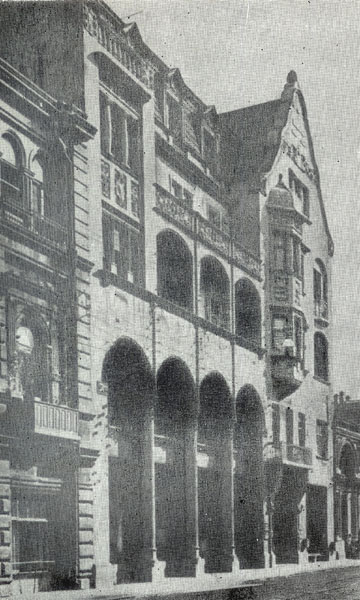
The dwelling house of Adamyan brothers (1908) in Baratinskaya street designed by Gavriil Ter-Mikelov.

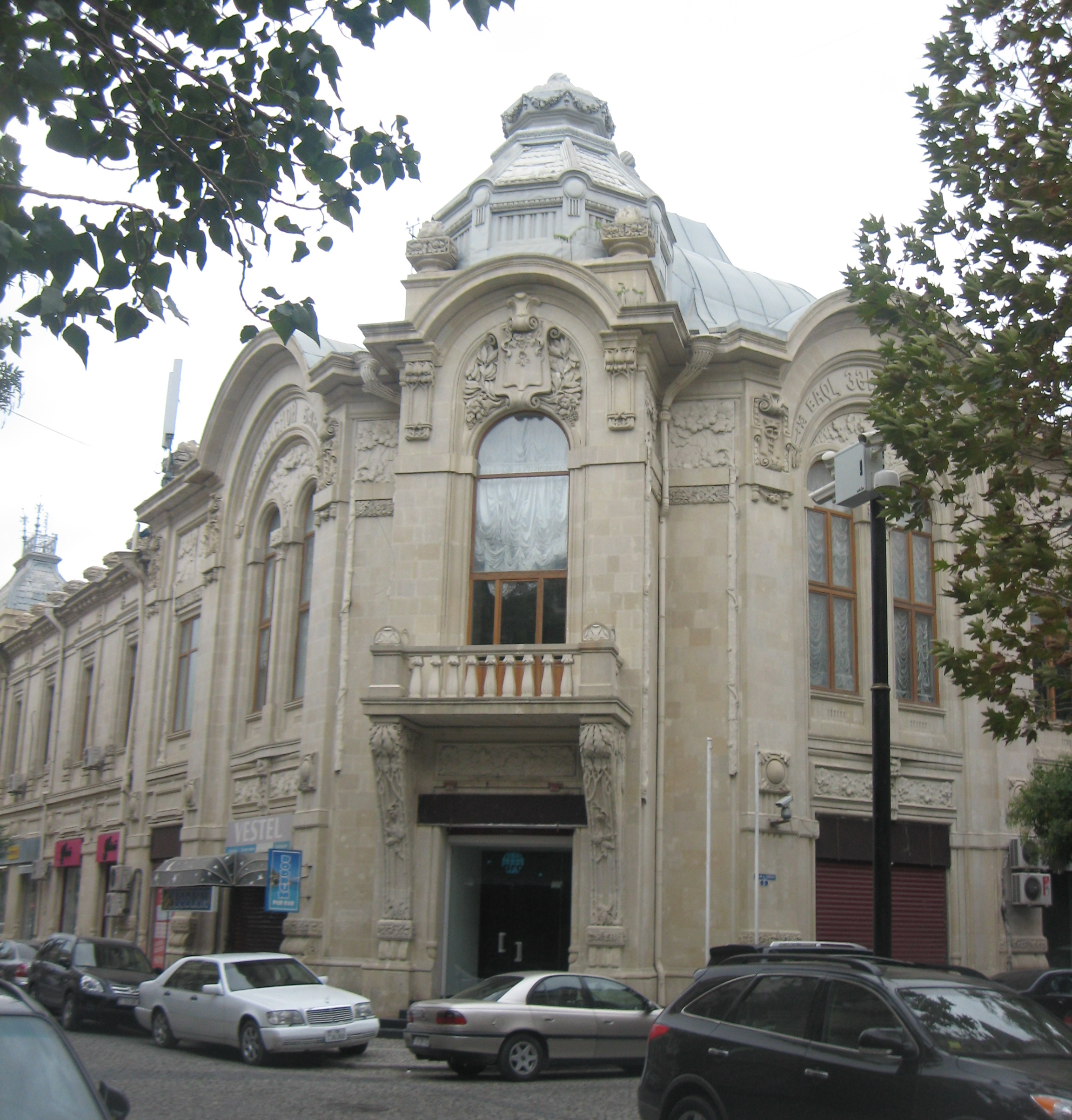
Baku Commercial Bank (1901) designed by Gavriil Ter-Mikelov.

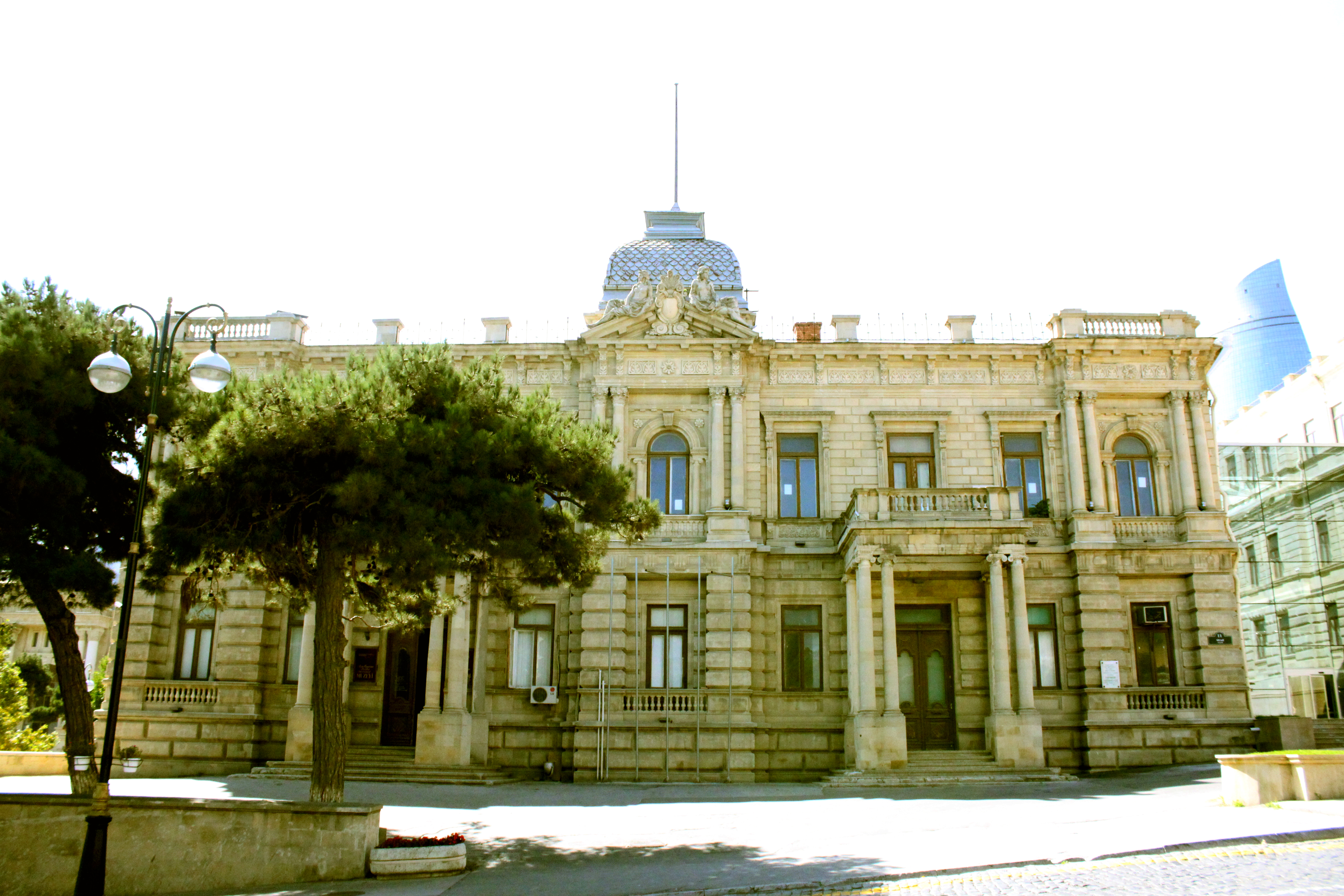
First building of the National Art Museum of Azerbaijan designed by Nikolaus von der Nonne.

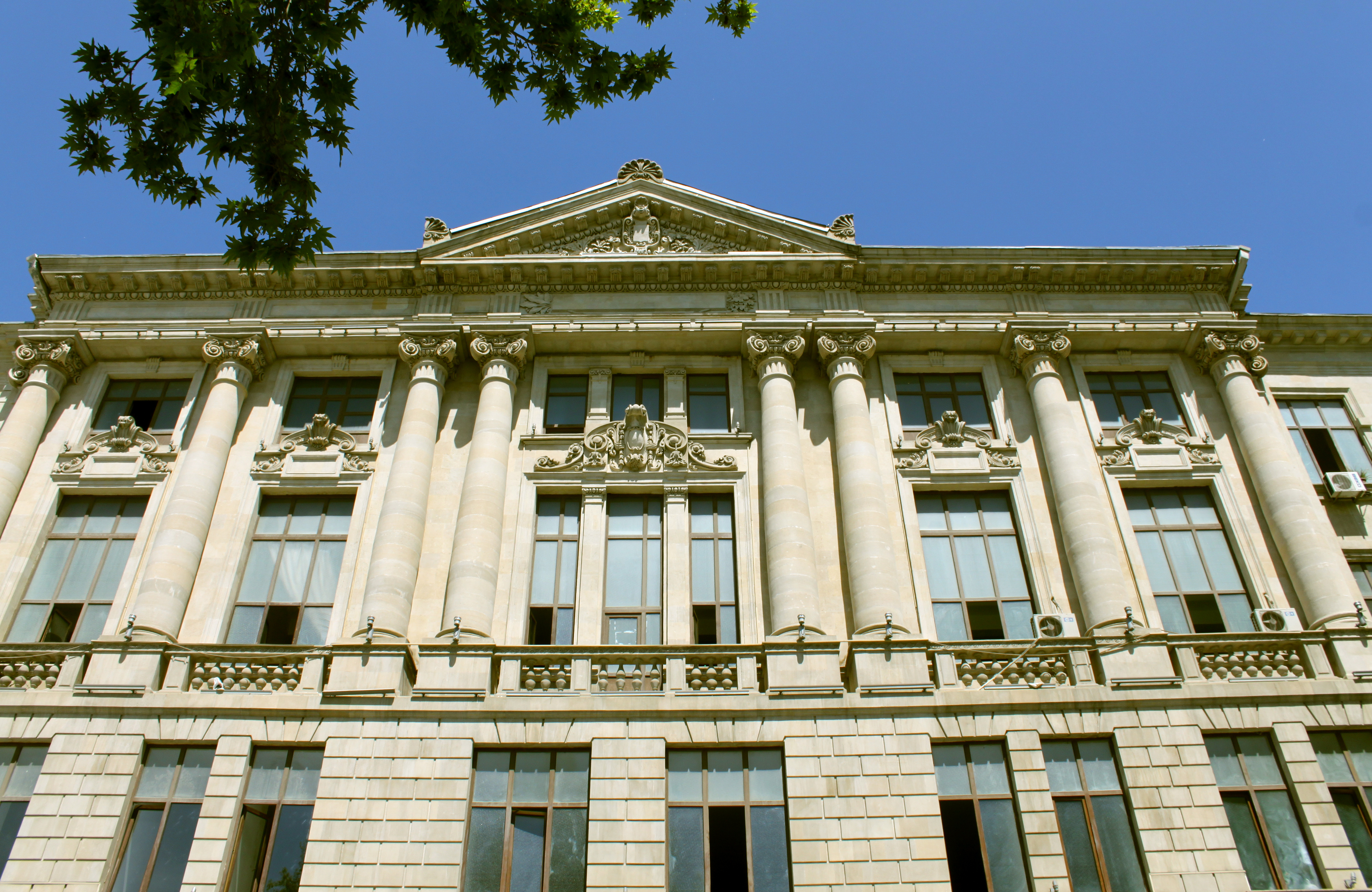
Building of Hospital designed by Konstantin Borisoglebskiy.

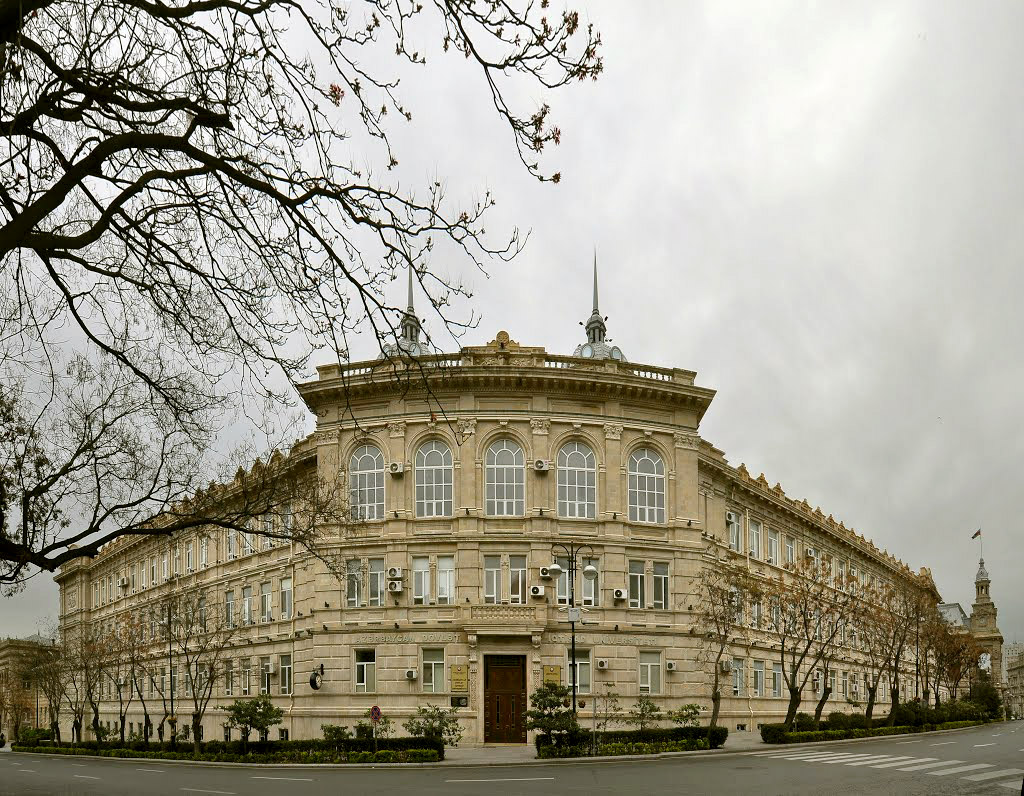
The main building of Azerbaijan State Economic University designed by Dmitriy Buynov.

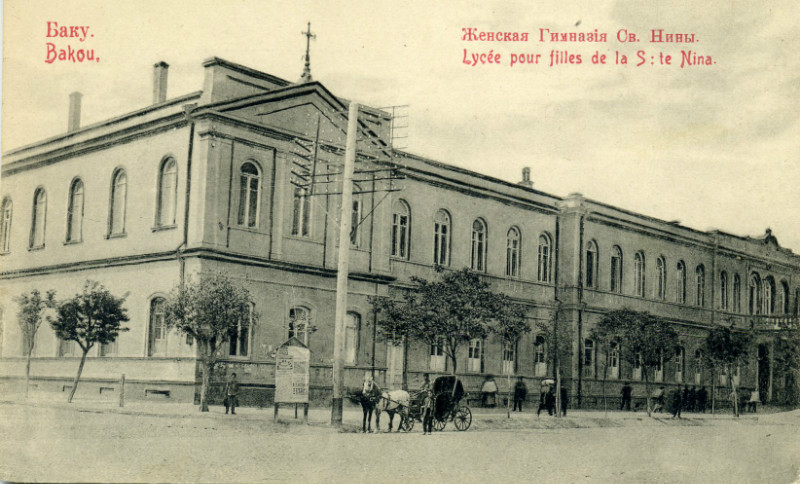
The building of Saint Nina's school (now the building of the school №132) designed by Dmitriy Buynov.

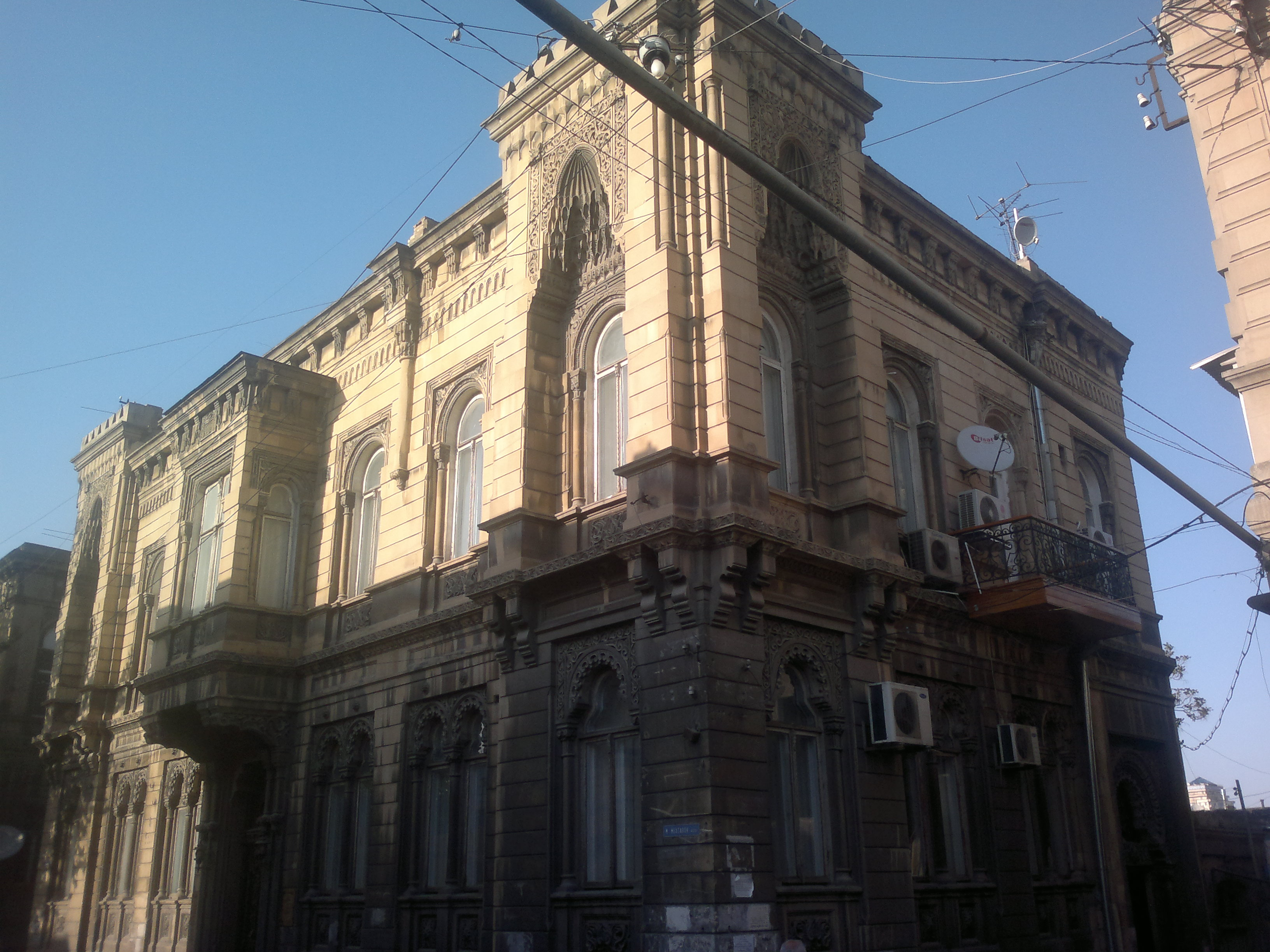
The Building of the Union of Architects of Azerbaijan. Built in 1899 by Eugeniusz Skibiński.

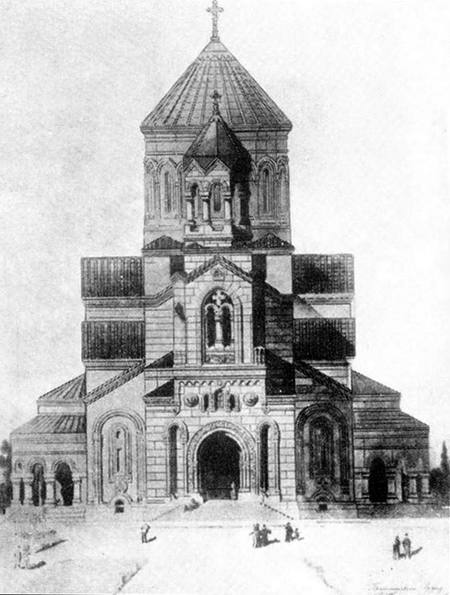
Saint Thaddeus and Bartholomew Armenian Church constructed by Alexander Rotinyan, Gabriel Ter-Mikayelian, and Hovhannes Katchaznouni. Destroyed in the 1930s.

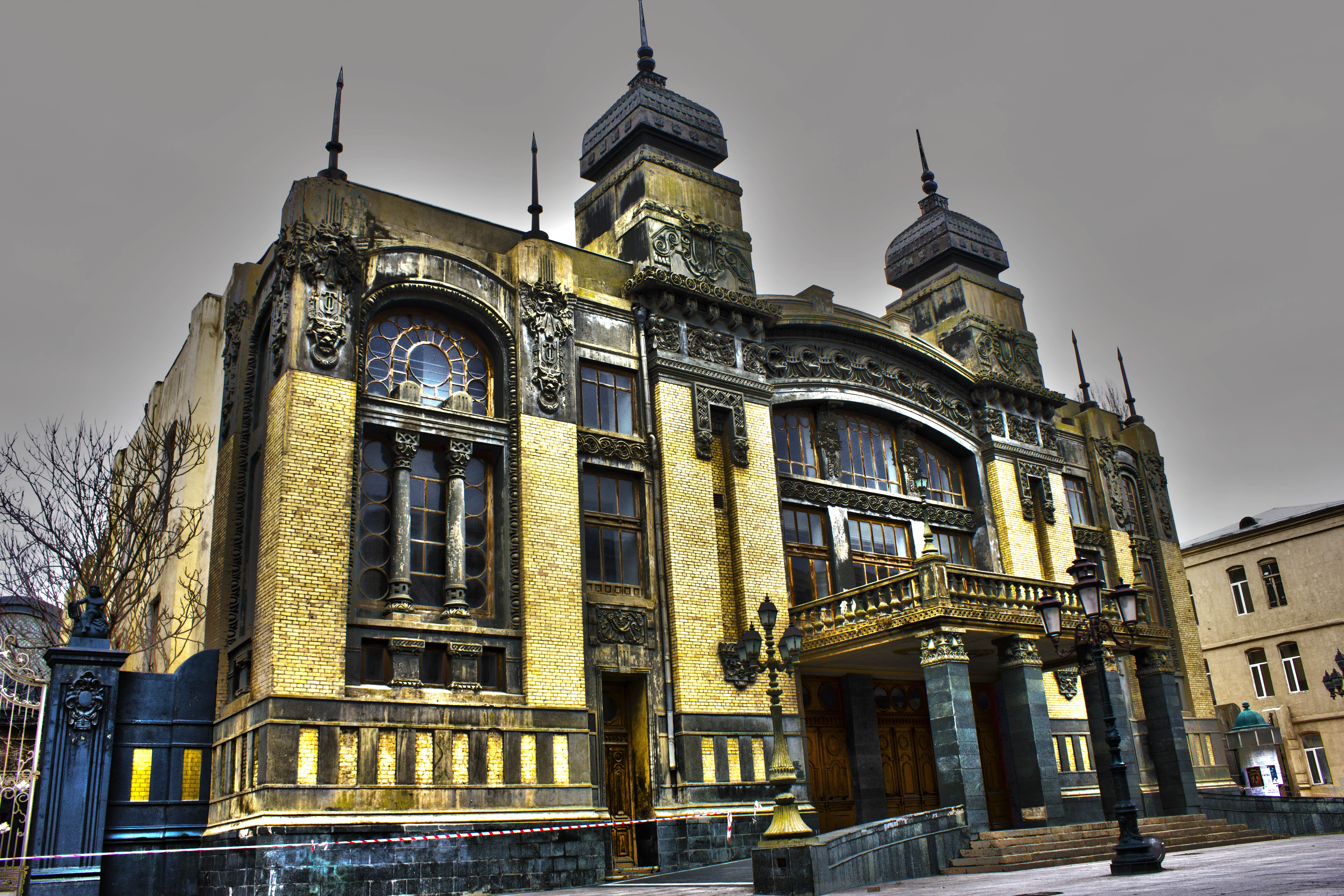
Azerbaijan State Opera Theatre (formerly known as The Great Theater of the Mayilyan Brothers) constructed by Nikolai Bayev (1910–11).

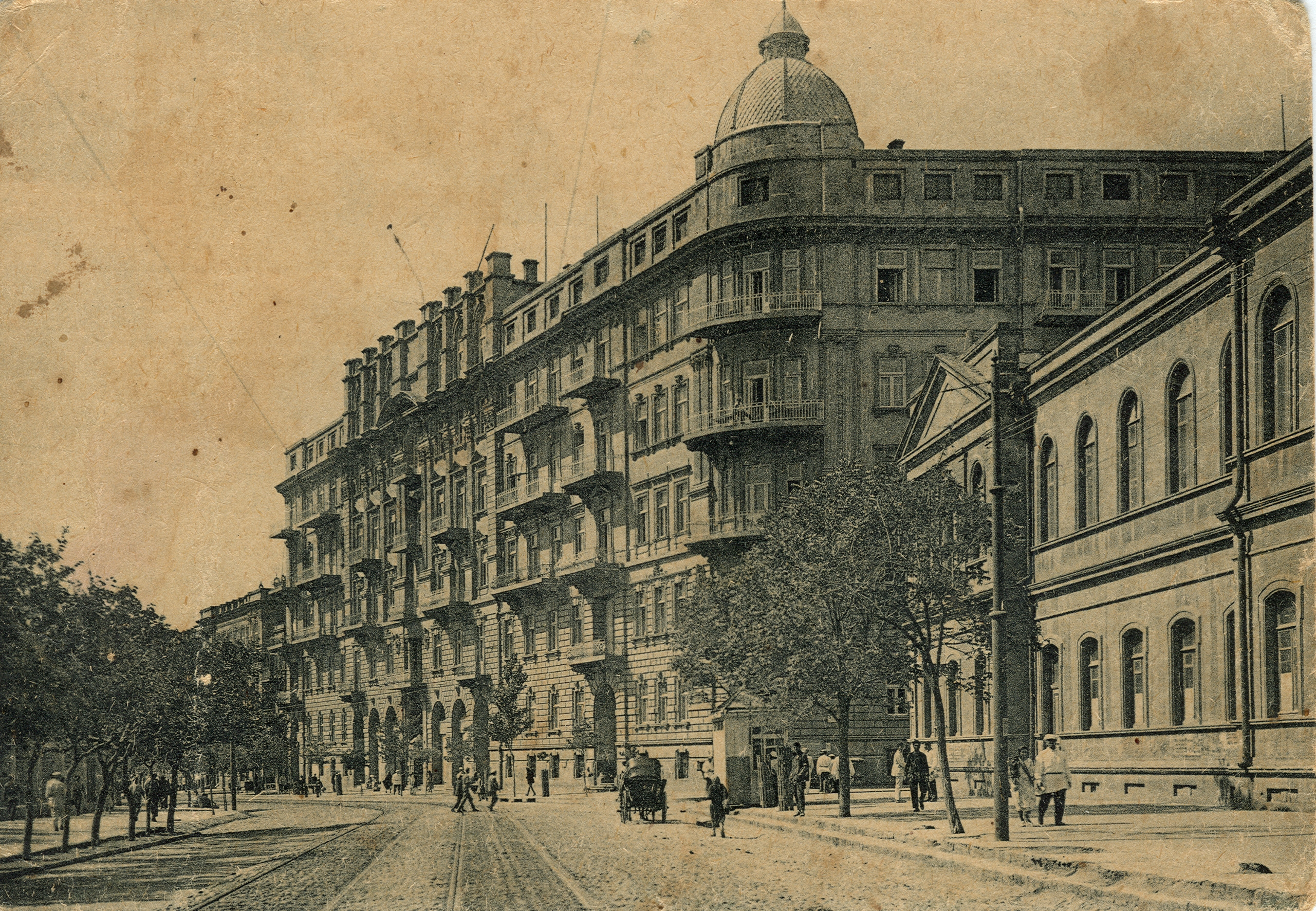
The house of Mirzabekov (Mirzabekyan) brothers on Nikolayevskaya street (today Istiglaliyyat Street), designed by Vartan Sarkisov

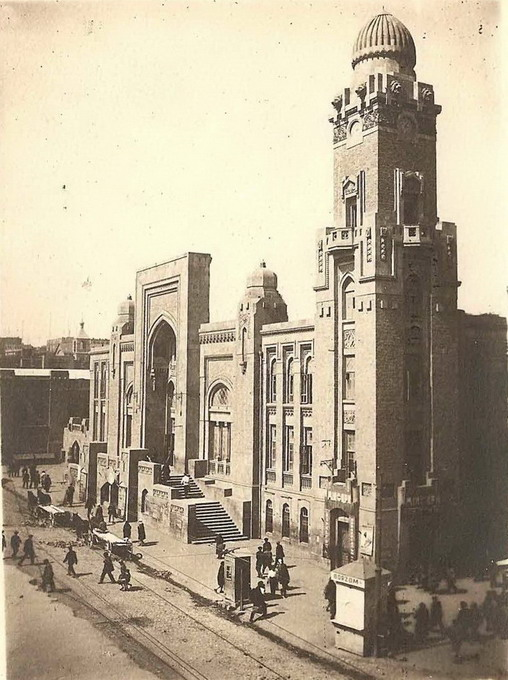
Sabunchi Railroad Station built by Nikolai Bayev (1927; today world's largest KFC).

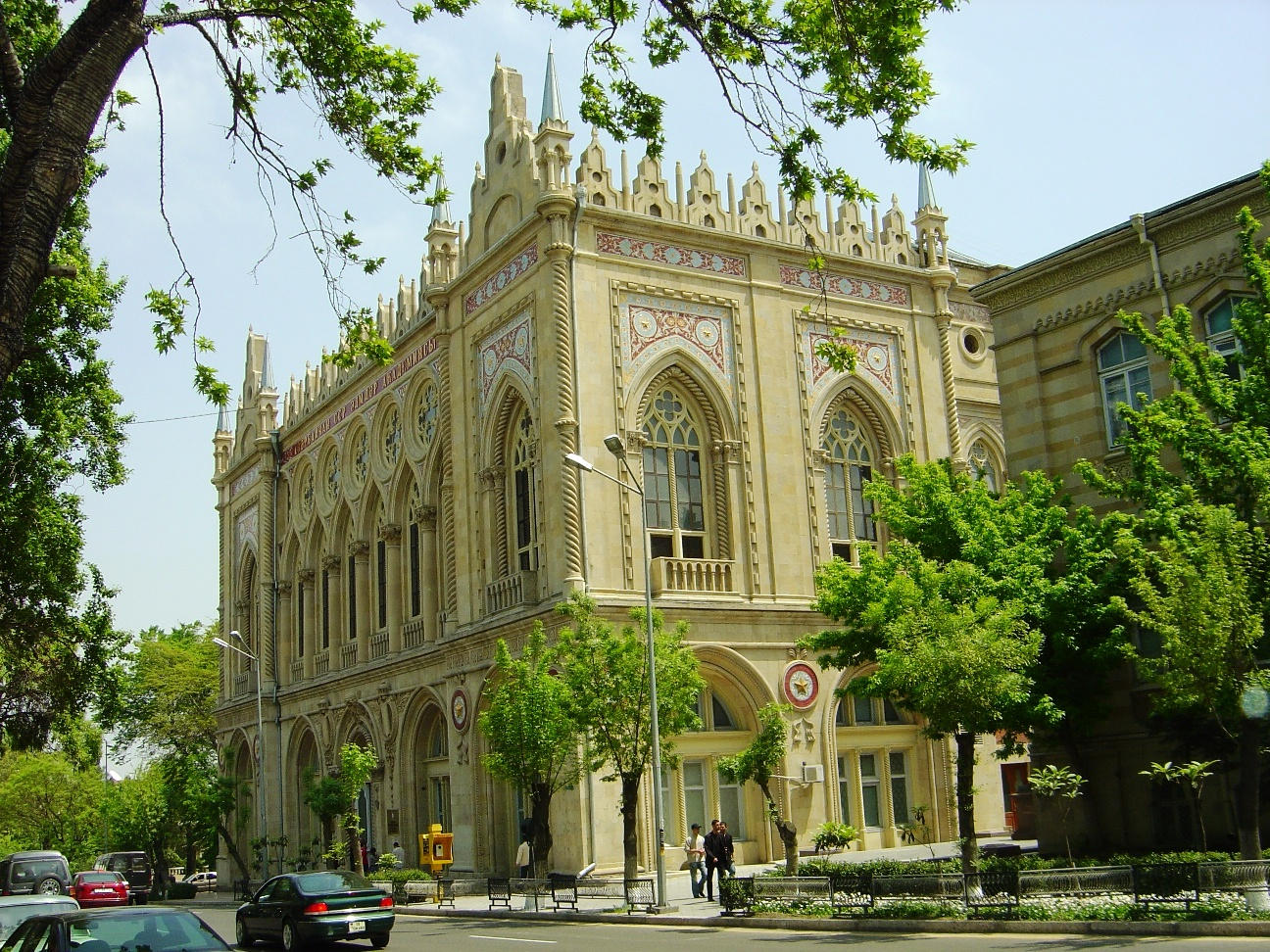
Ismailiyya building: Built in 1913 by Józef Płoszko. Rebuilt by Vartan Sarkisov after a fire

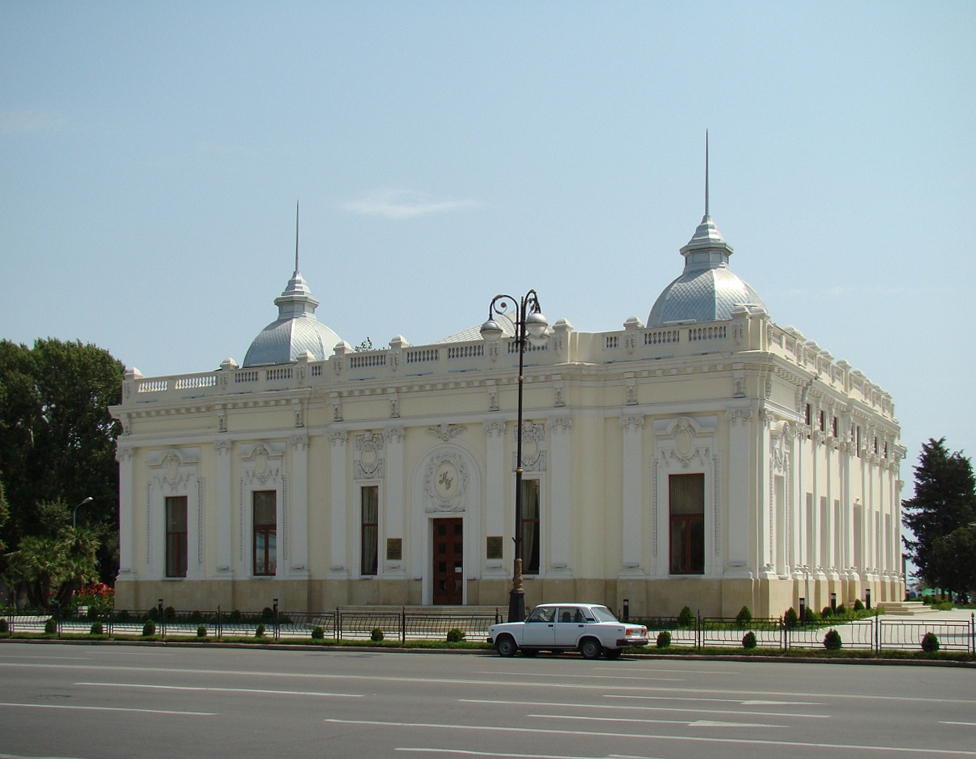
Building of Baku Puppet Theatre. Built by Józef Płoszko

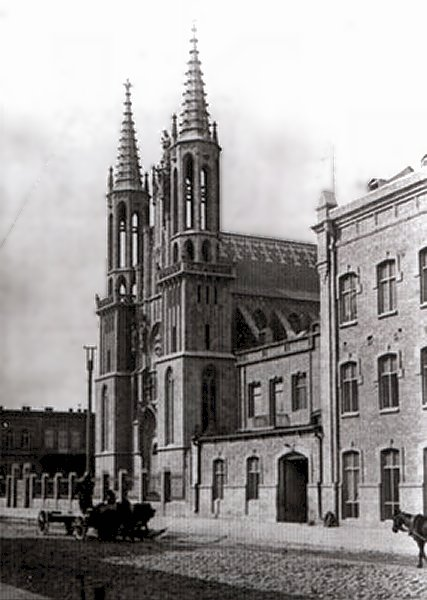
The Church of the Blessed Virgin Mary's Immaculate Conception. Built by Józef Płoszko

Heydar Aliyev Palace (formerly Lenin Palace) built by B. Ginsburg, E. Melkhisedekov and V. Shulgin with the assistance of Armenian architects R. Torosyan, Martin Tovmasyan, and engineer A. Avanesov.

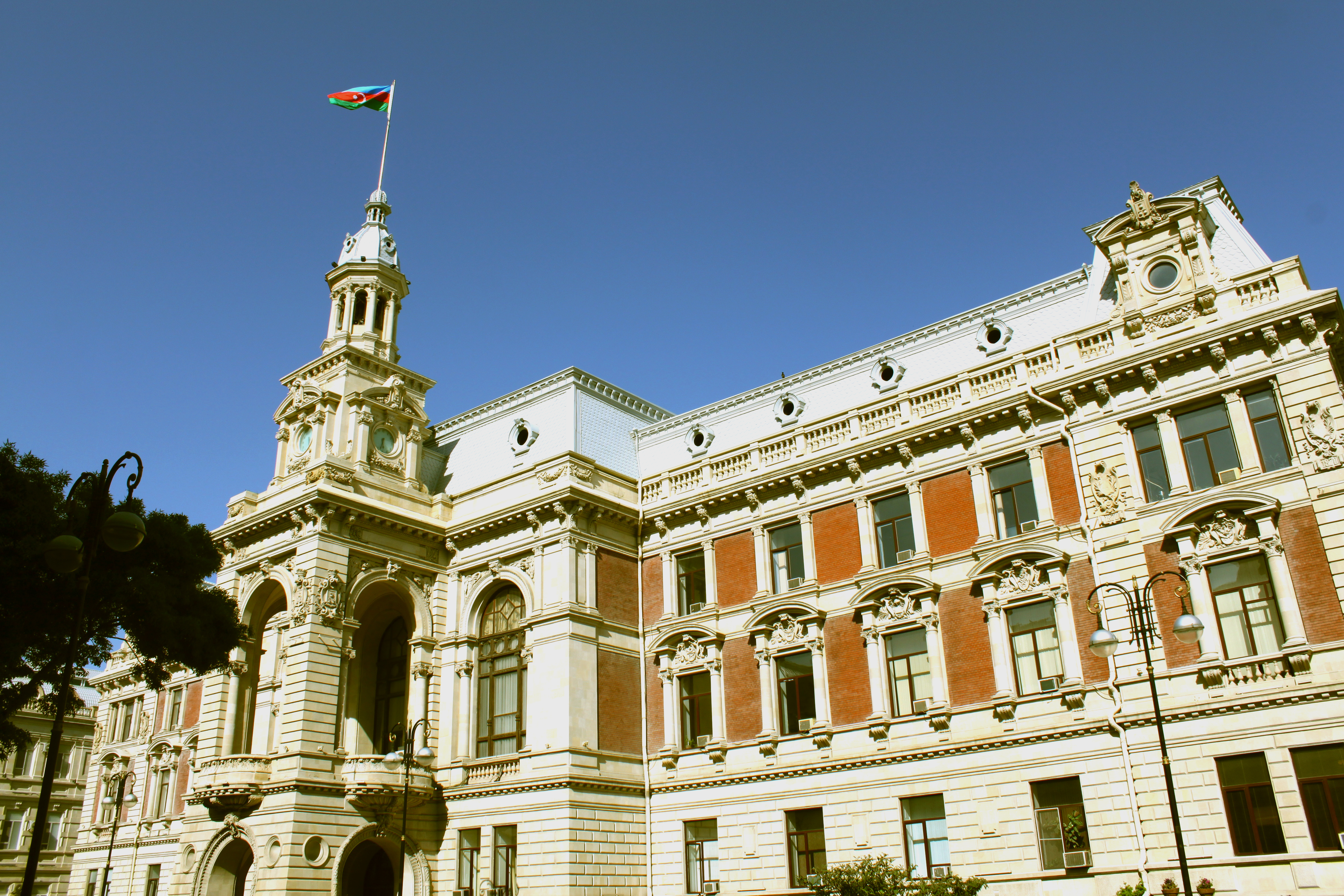
Baku Municipality Hall. Built by Józef Gosławski

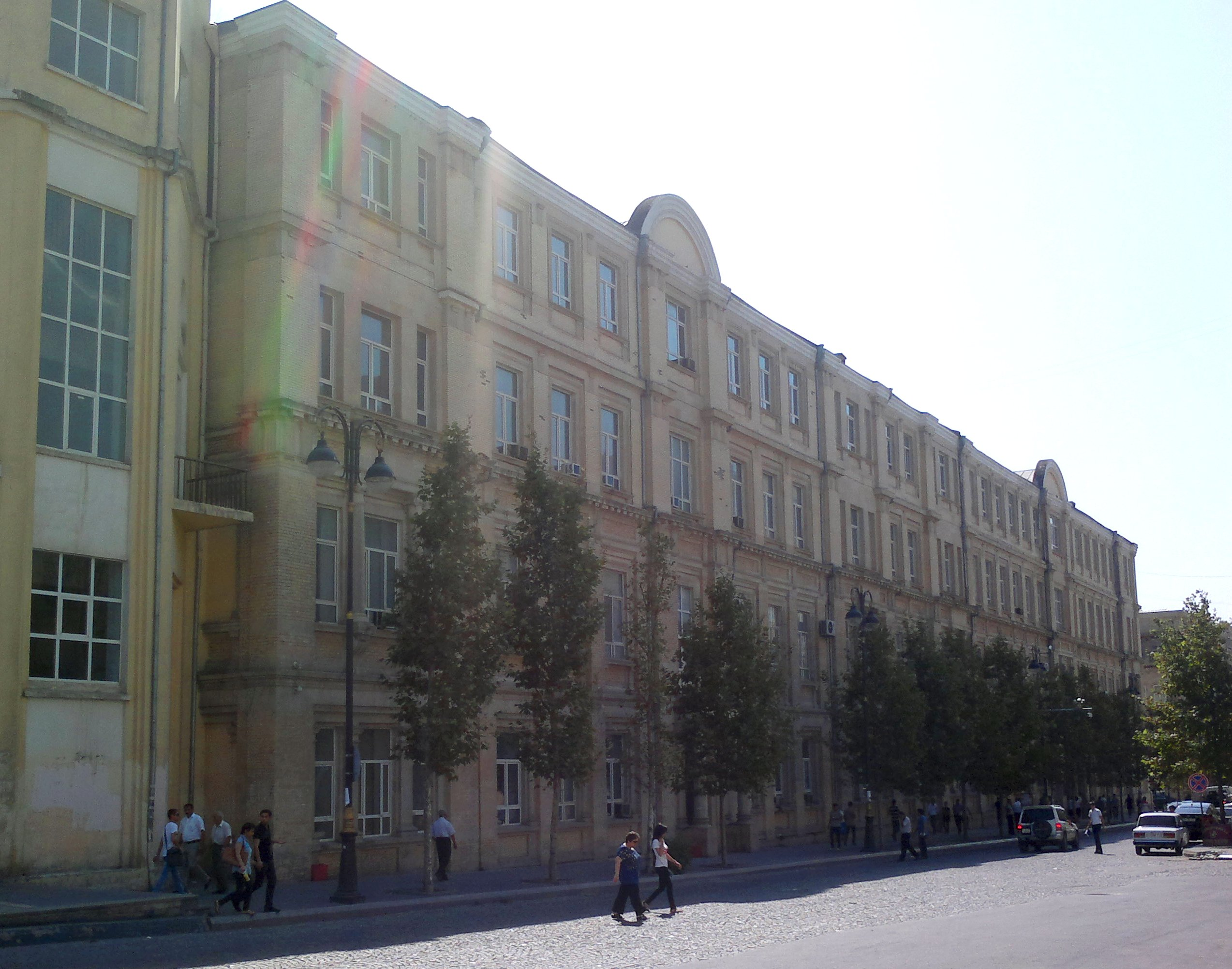
Building of Azerbaijan State Oil Academy. First two floors were built by Józef Gosławski

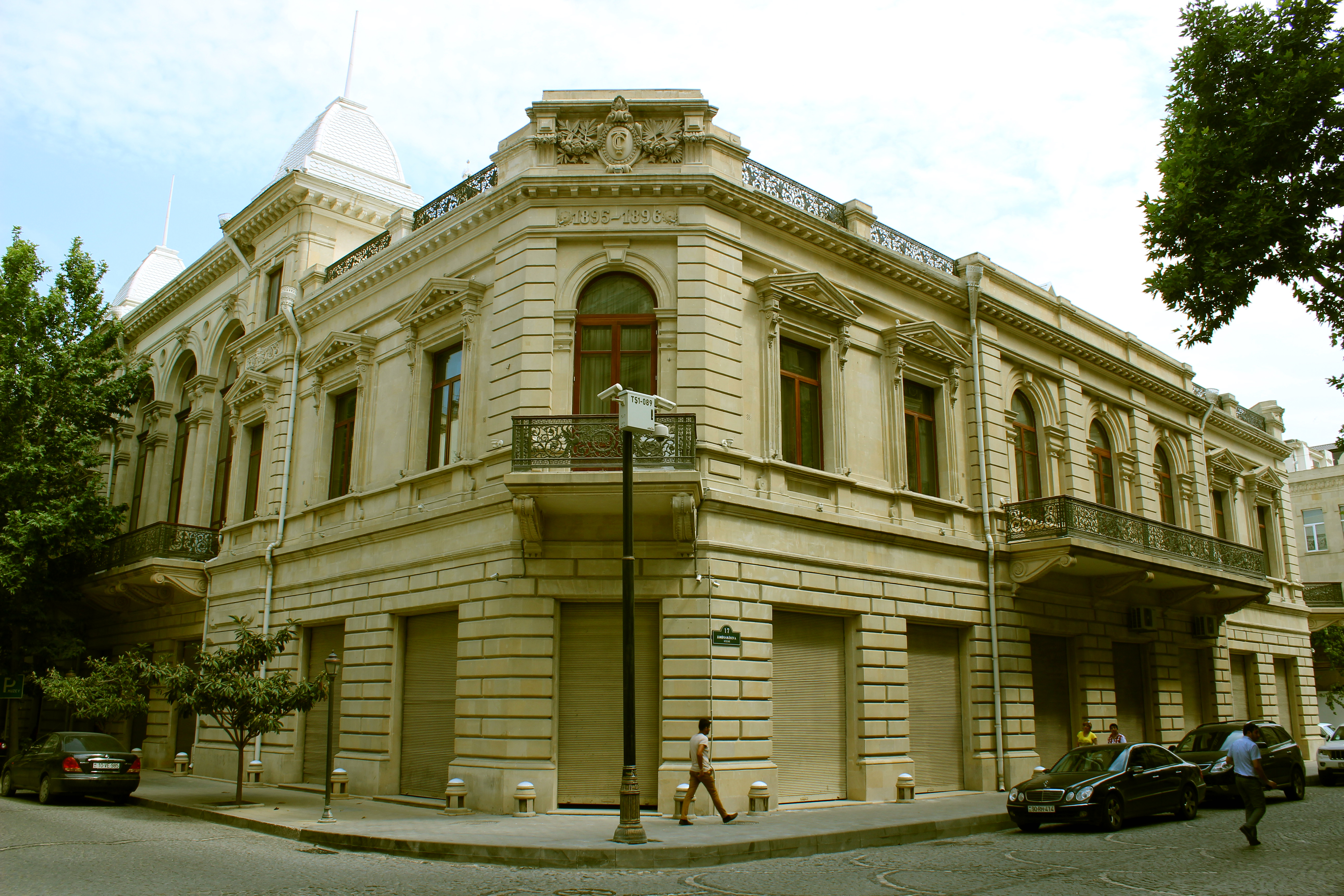
Building of National Museum of History of Azerbaijan. Built by Józef Gosławski

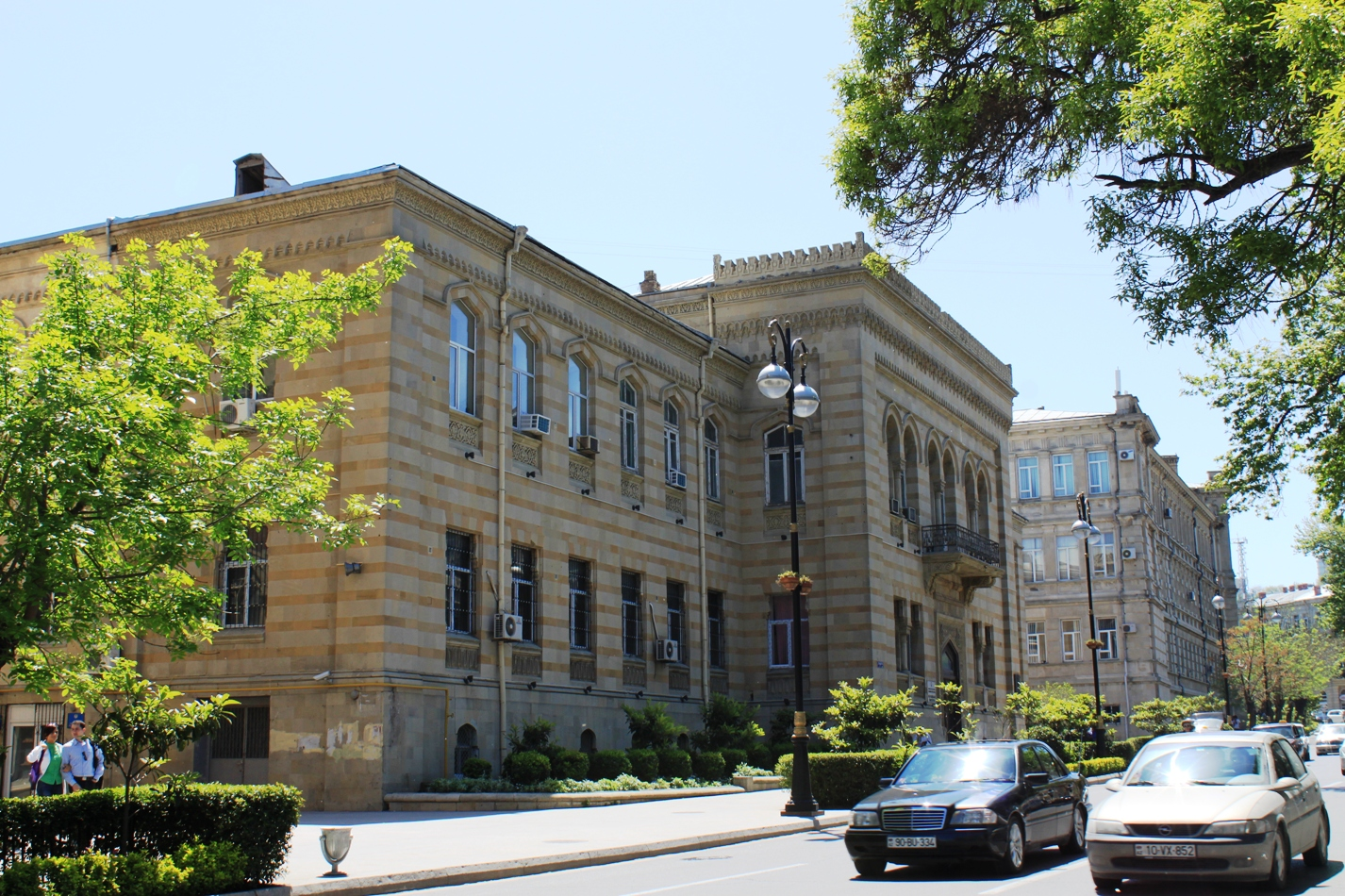
Building of Institute of Manuscripts of Azerbaijan. Built by Józef Gosławski

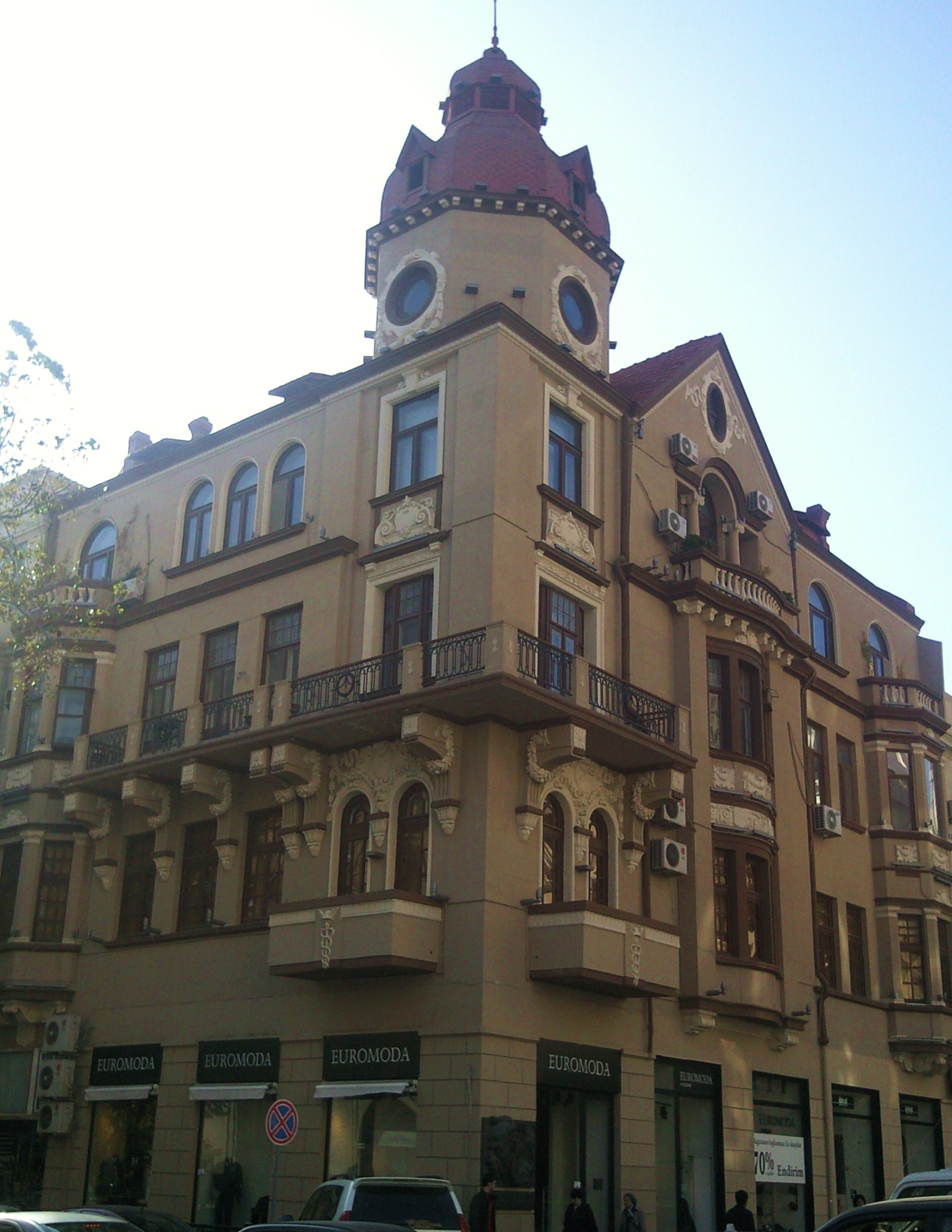
Residence on Krasnovodskaya street built by Vartan Sarkisov (1908). Lev Landau lived in this house till 1924.

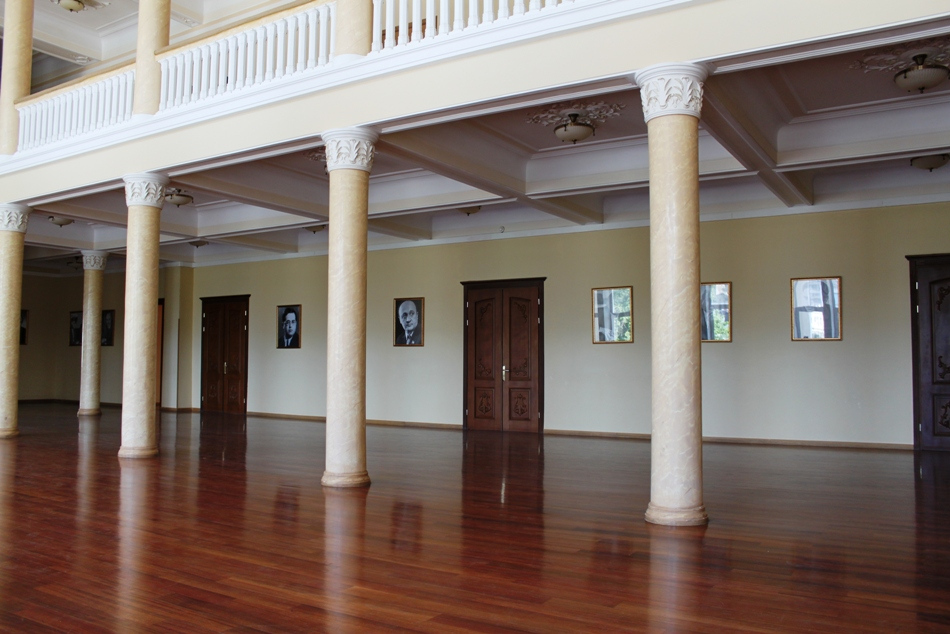
Hall of Baku Academy of Music. Designed by Mikayil Huseynov

State Public Library named after M.F.Akhundov (1960). Designed by Mikayil Huseynov

== Current developments ==
As a developing city largely influenced by economic oil boom, there are many construction projects that are currently being built that will change the city's skyline in the near future. Some of the construction project are SOCAR Tower, the Crescent Development project, Baku White City, Baku National Stadium, Full Moon Hotel, Baku Hilton Hotel, and the Four Seasons Hotel. A lot of the new development has come at the cost of old Soviet-era existing structures. The destruction of the Soviet heritage has created controversy, such as the recent destruction of the Soviet-era 26 Commissars Memorial in 2009 to make way for a new car park.

In 2011, Discovery channel's Extreme Engineering program featured these projects that are under construction in Baku.

== Skyline ==
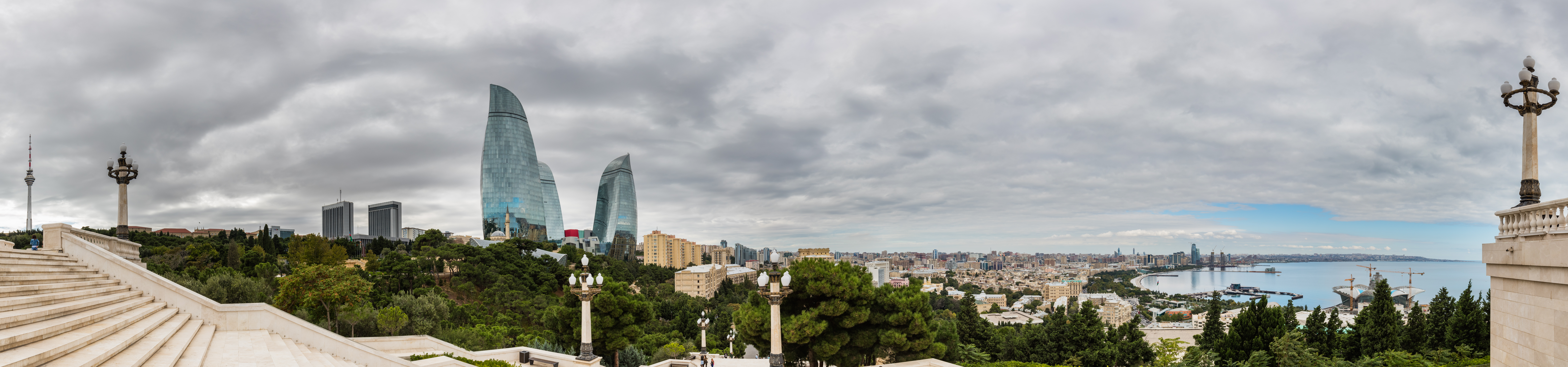
A panoramic view of Baku Bay

== See also ==
- Architecture of Azerbaijan
