= Keshla =

- Municipality
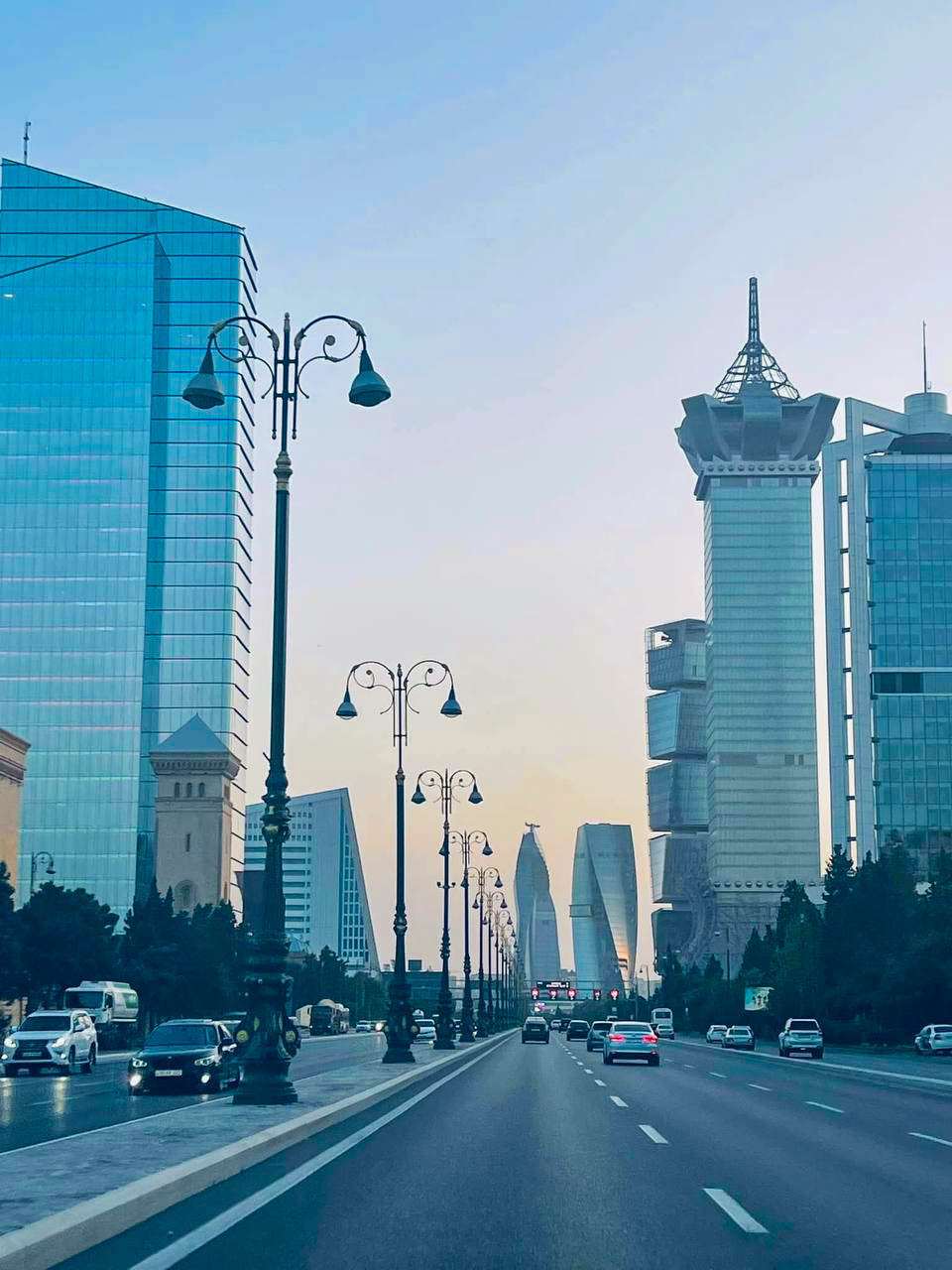

- Location of Keshla in Azerbaijan
- Coordinates: 40°23′52″N 49°53′55″E
- Country: Azerbaijan
- City: Baku
- District: Nizami

Population
  - Total: 100,626
- Time zone: UTC+4 (AZT)
  - Summer (DST): UTC+5 (AZT)

Baku Azerbaijan street map

Keshla (Кешлә, کشله; also Keşlə, Kishly, Kishlya, Kishty, and Kitly) is a settlement and municipality in Baku, Azerbaijan.

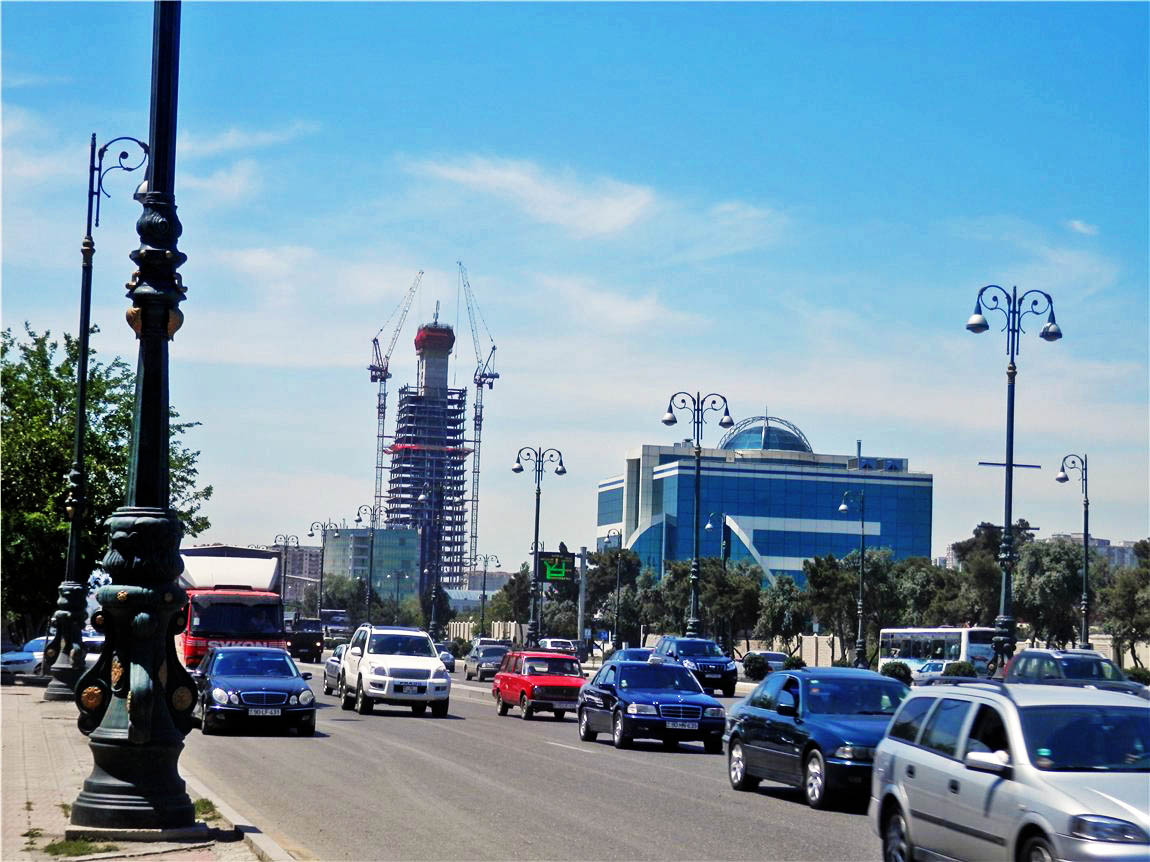
SOCAR Tower view from H. Aliev avenue

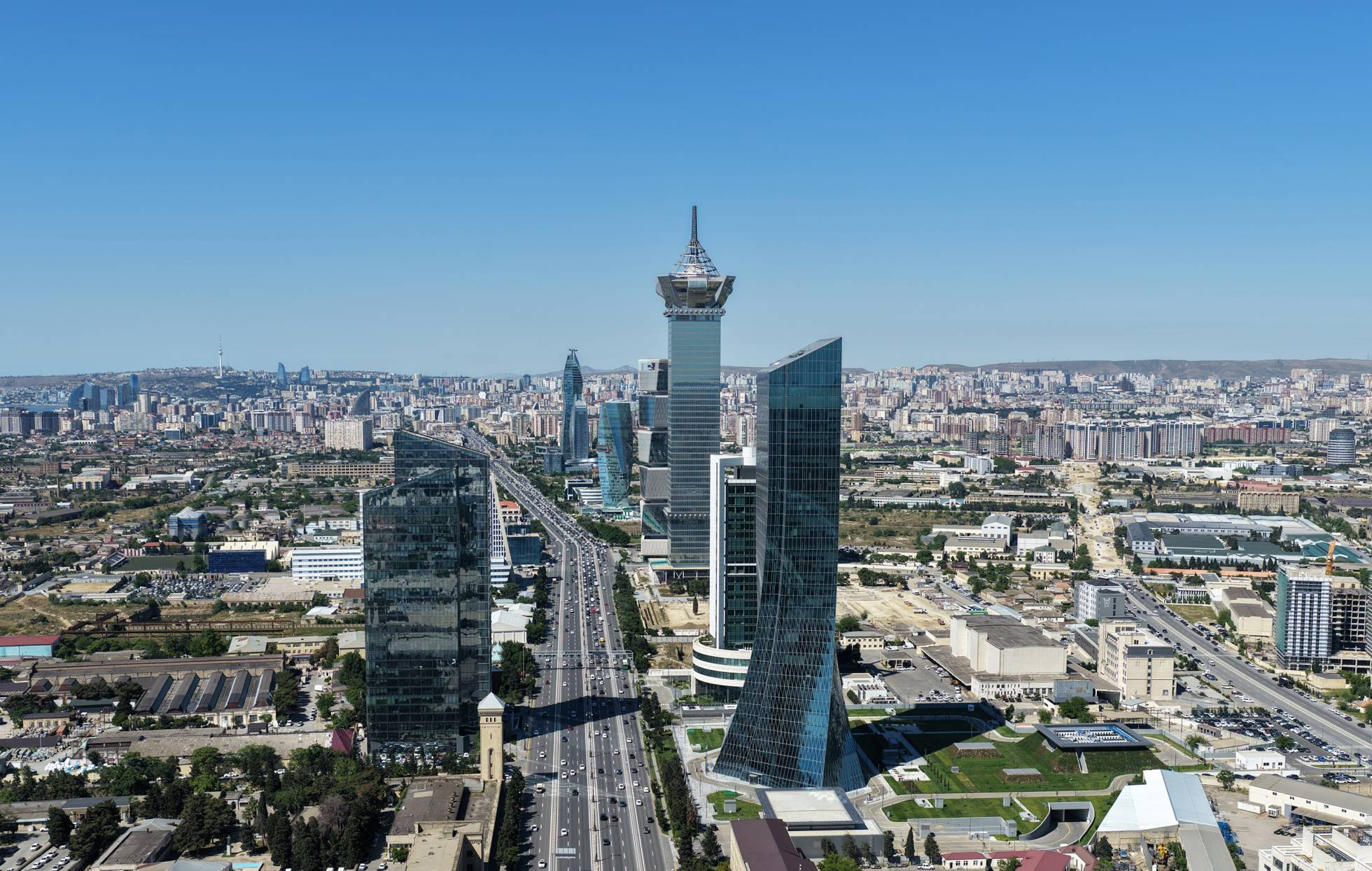
Financial Center of Baku

== History ==
The name Keshla is first mentioned in sources in the 17th century. The former name was Keshlaqishlag. Oykonim reflects the name of the Keshli / Keshla tribe of Turkic origin. The document of the 18th century provides information about the right of Keshli and Karamanli tribes to use Gazakhli, Alasli and Borchali pastures.

The refinery district was about 8 miles (13 km) from the shipping ports. An industrial area plan was completed in 1876. Some of the farms and pastures of the neighbouring village of Keshla were zoned to accommodate replacements for factories that had been dismantled in the city.

The settlement, located in the Nizami district of Baku, was established in 1936, and since 1939 has been part of Baku, first as an urban massif, and since 1991 as an independent settlement. Its population has exceeded 100,000 people. Most of the population's jobs are in industry and trade. There is a machine-building plant and social facilities. The meaning of the toponym is explained as "plain", "wide valley". It is studied in detail in the book "Keshla and Keshlaliler" written by Veli Habiboglu Majidov. There was access to Shirvanshah's palace from the settlement. Until recently, the remains of the Keshla fortress were visible in the settlement. There is a 17th-century mosque here. Keshla village. - The real name of the village is Qishla. Over time, this word took the form of Keshla. This village was closely connected with Baku khans. The khans' horses, cattle and sheep were kept in the winter.

== Sport ==
Azerbaijani professional football club Keşla based in Keshla. The club has won the Premier League title twice.

== Places of interest ==
Museums and historical places

- Villa Petrolea

Sport venues

- ASK Arena

Religious buildings

- Shah Abbas Mosque (Keshla)

Shopping malls

- Metropark Shopping Mall

Tall buildings

- Baku Tower
- SOCAR Tower

== Transportation ==
=== Road ===
Baku Airport Highway

=== Railroad ===
The Keshla Station of Baku suburban railway.

=== Metro ===
Ulduz (Baku Metro), Koroğlu (Baku Metro). (The Keshla Metro Station in Purple Line and M-8 station in new Blue Line are planned in this area by Baku Metro in the future).

== Image gallery ==
SOCAR Tower

Azersu Tower in 2016.

SOFAZ Tower in 2016.

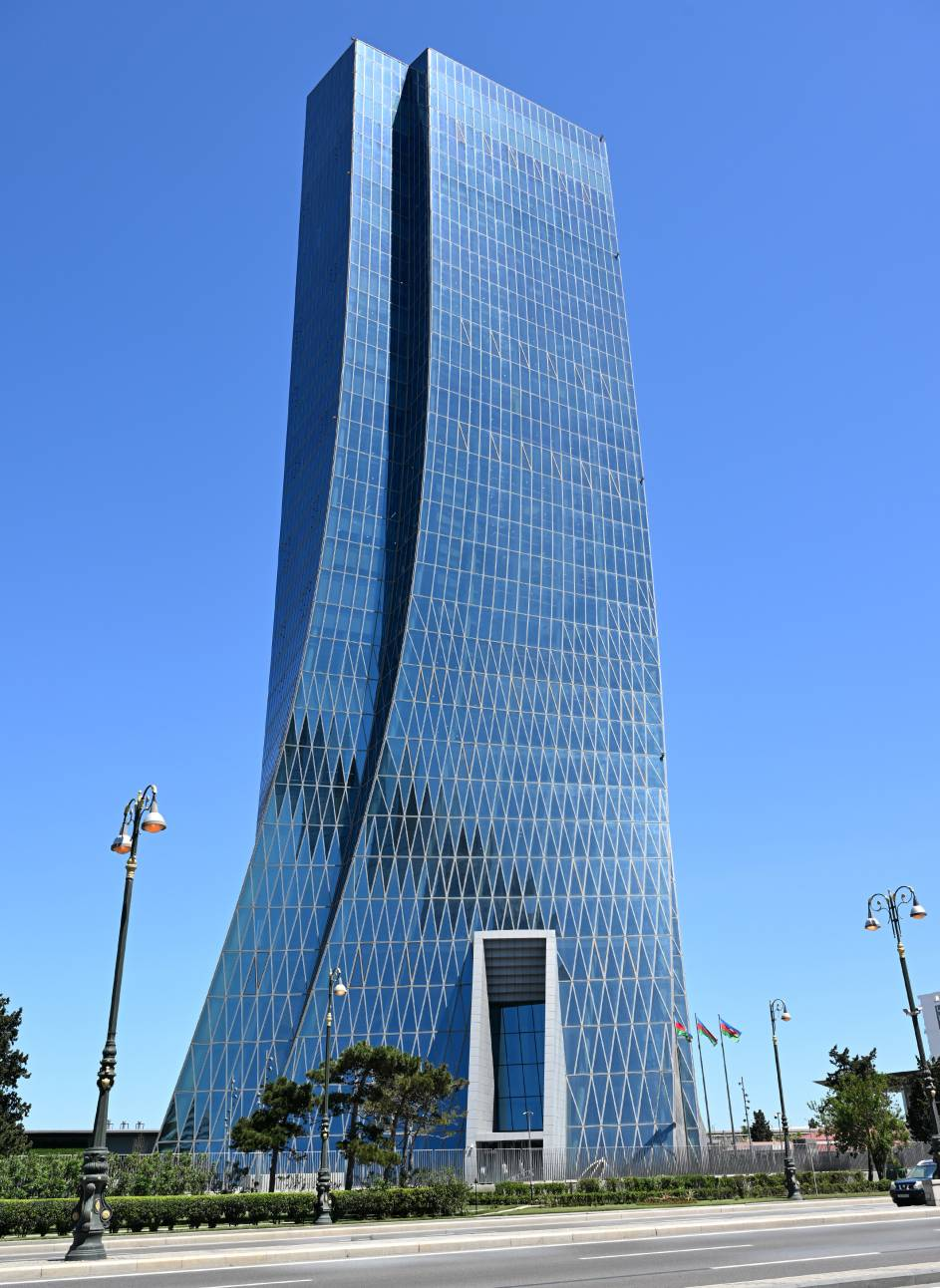
Central Bank of Azerbaijan

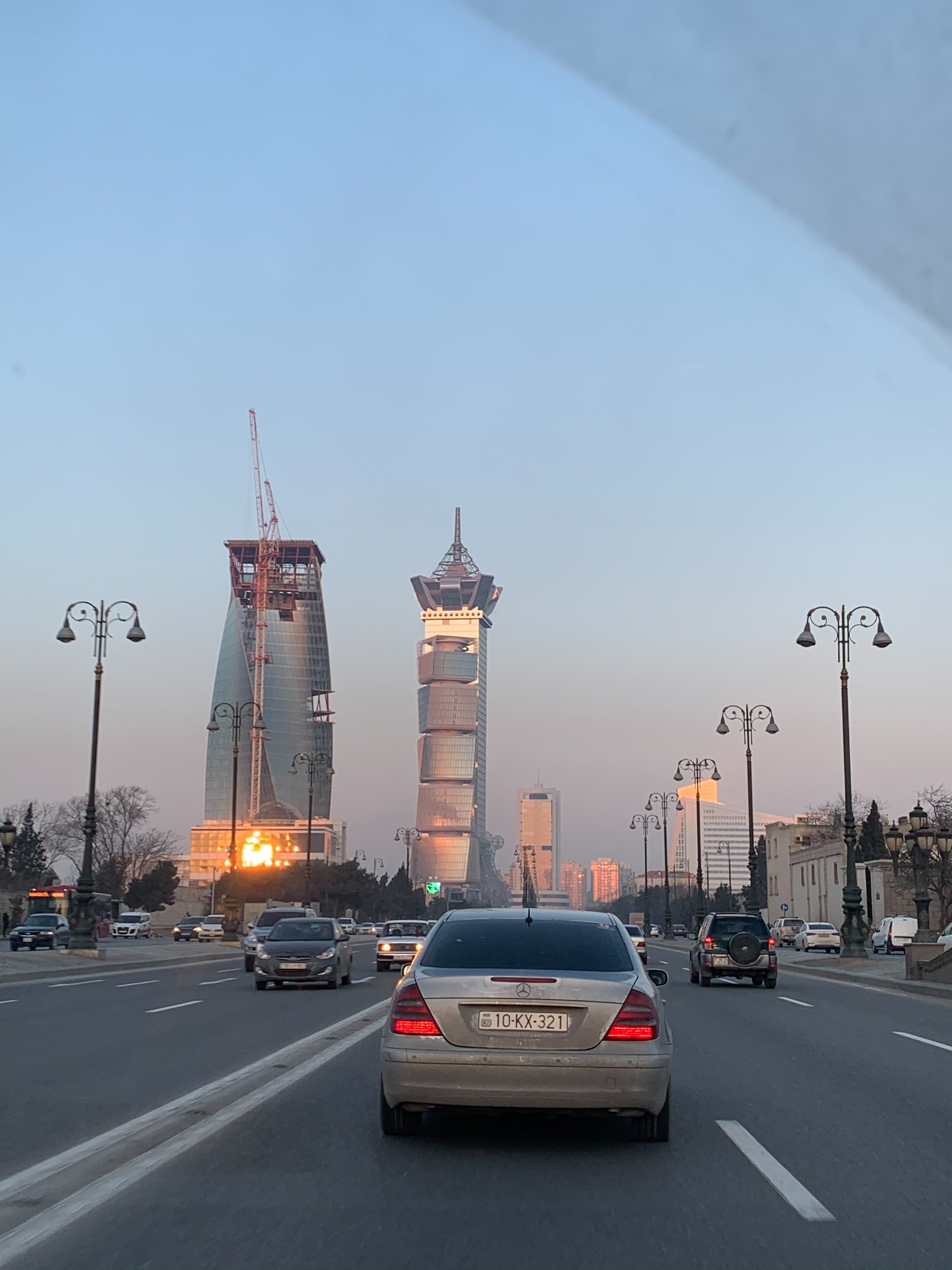
Baku Business Center

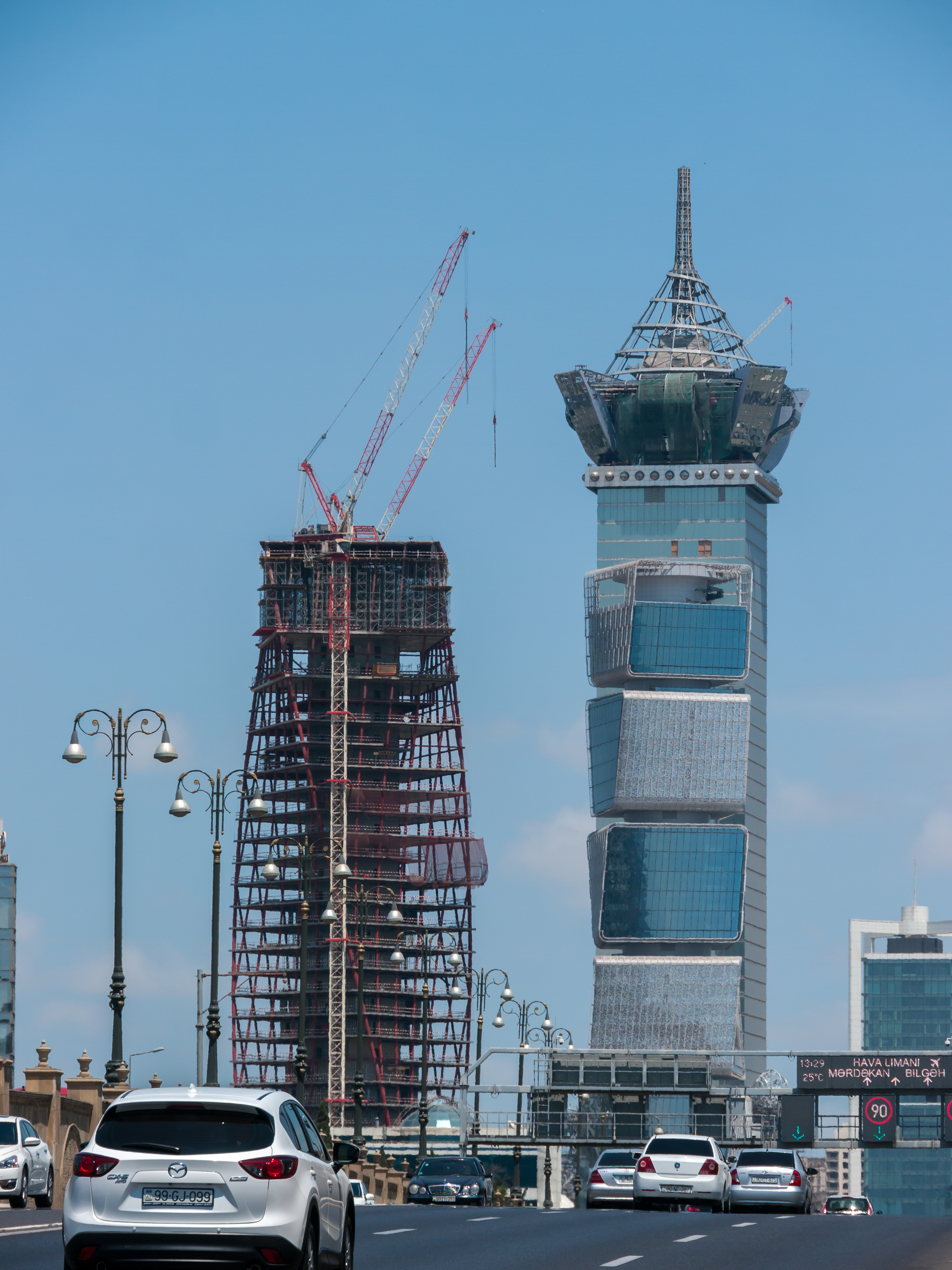
H. Aliyev Avenue

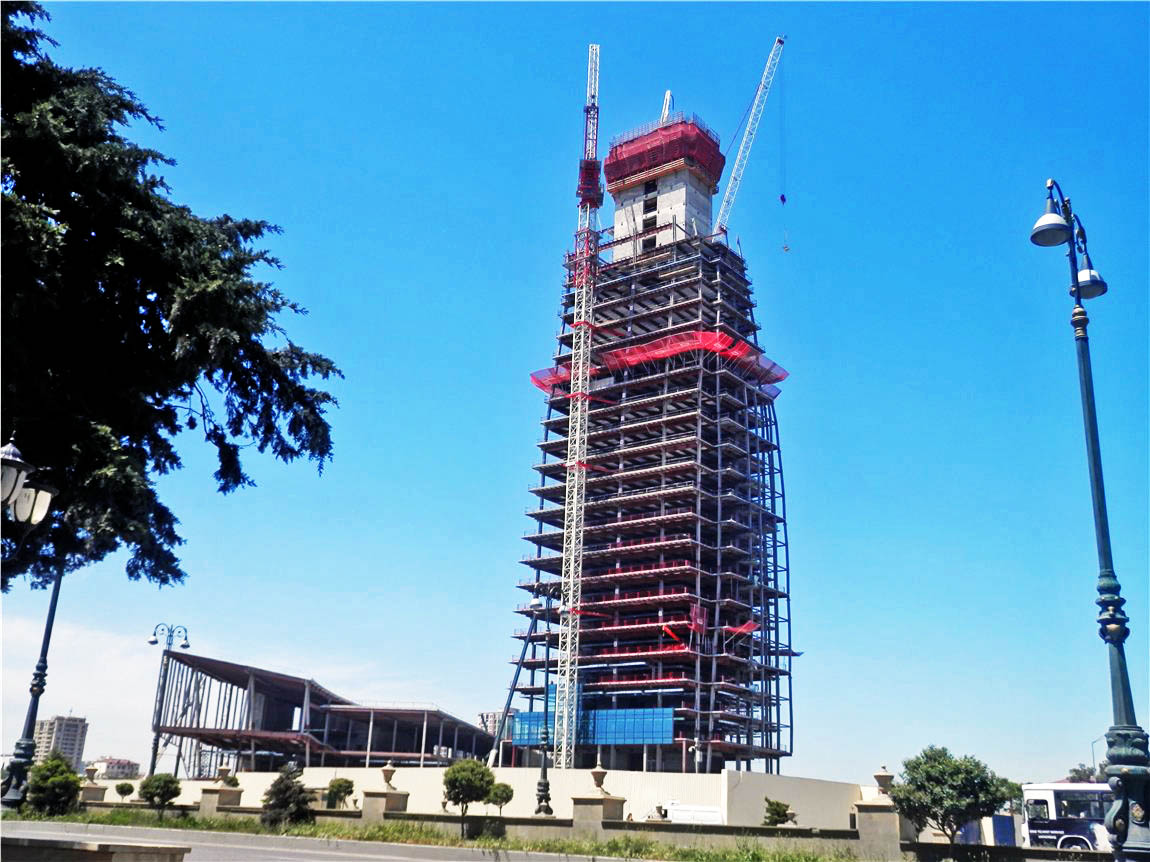
SOCAR Tower view from H. Aliev avenue during construction.

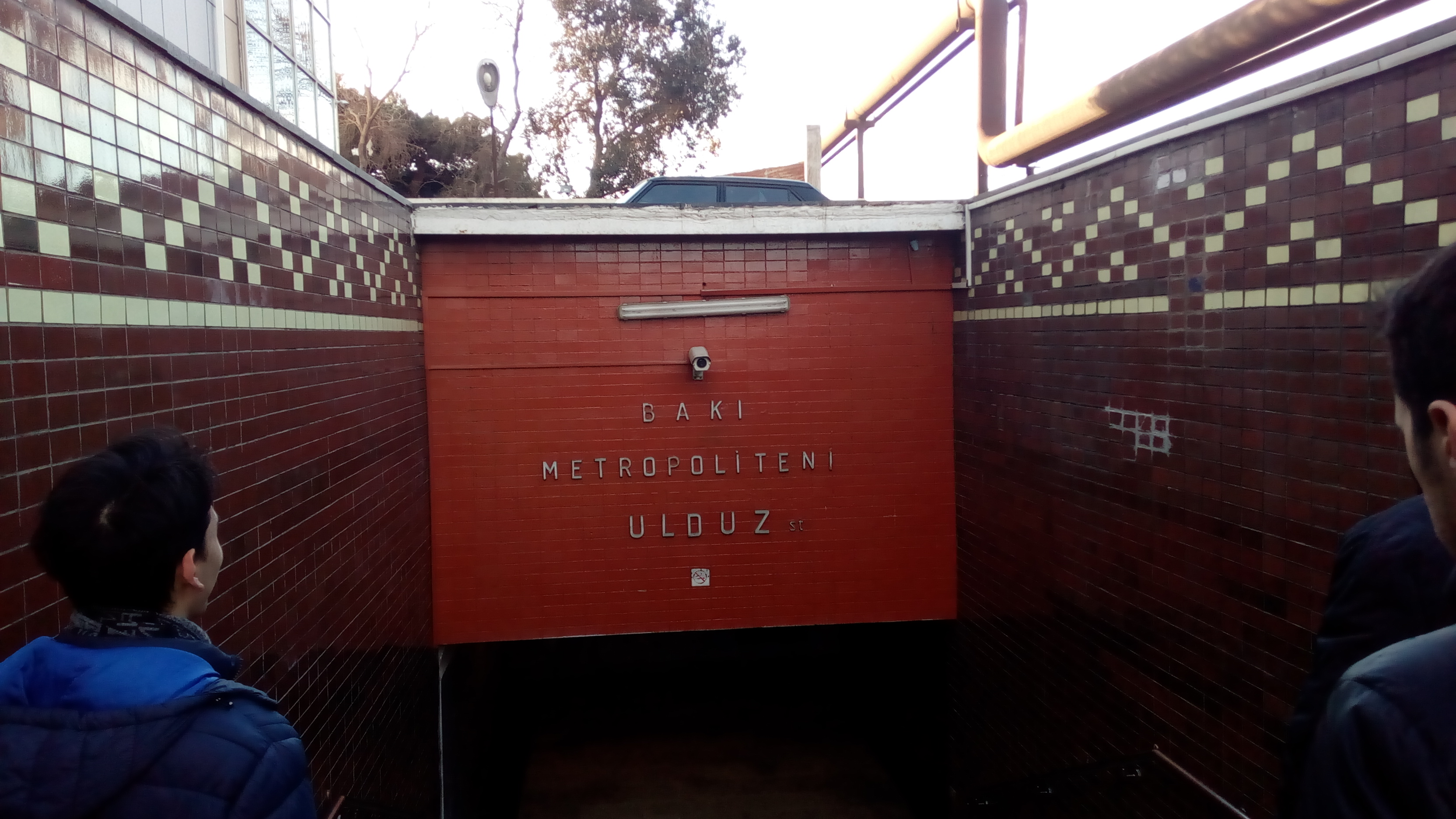
Ulduz metro station in the area

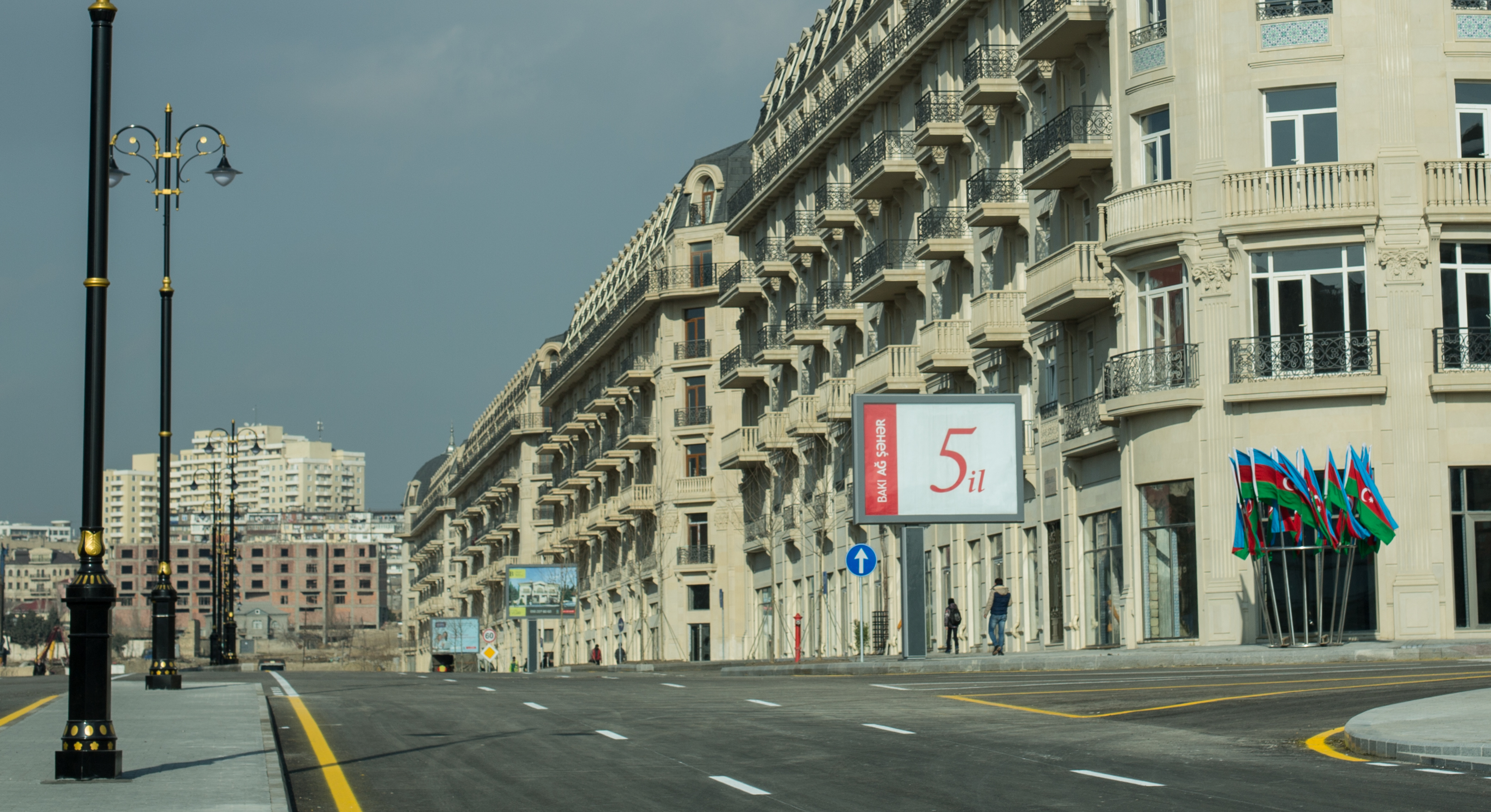
Buildings in Green Island

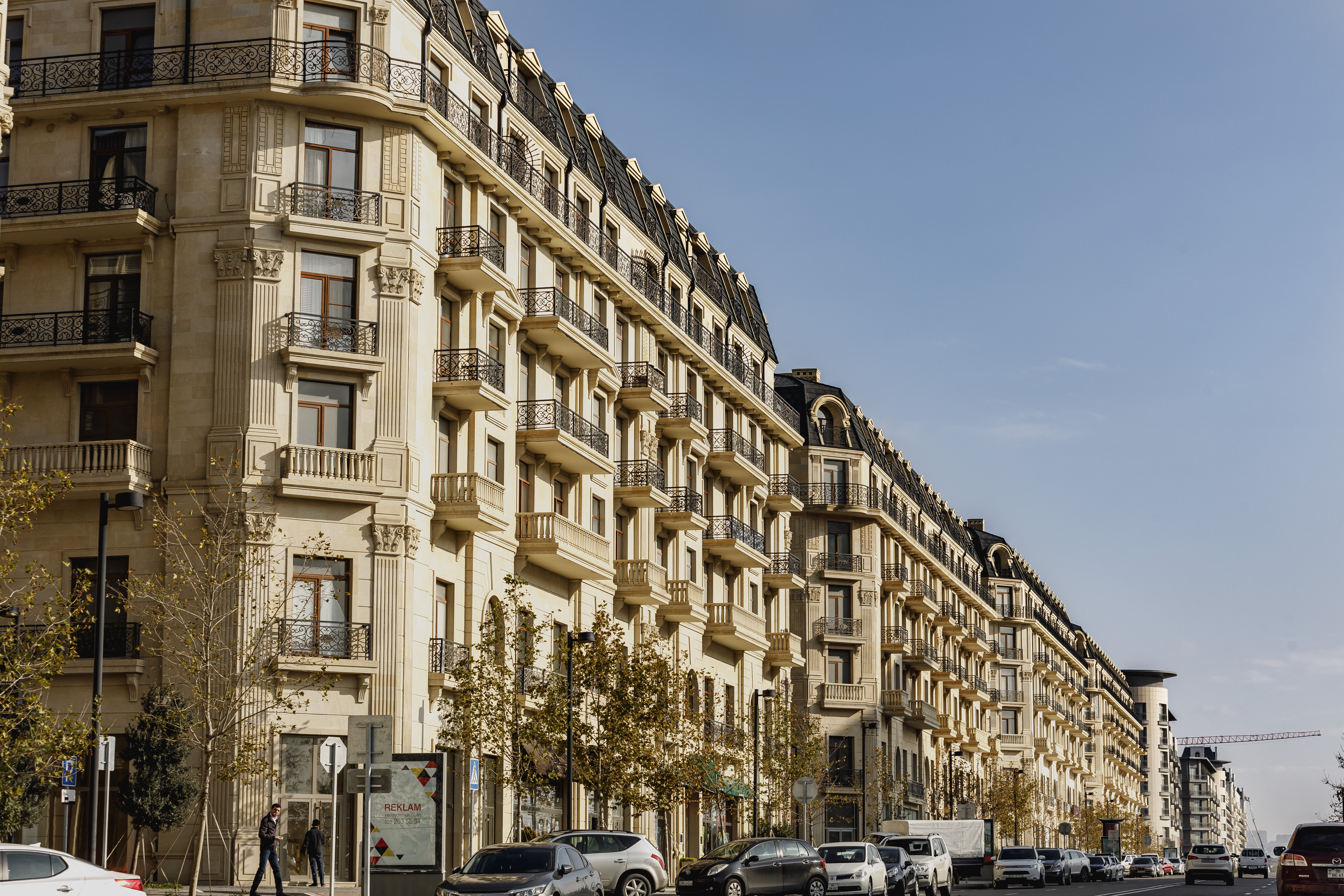
A revivalist-style White City residential building in construction

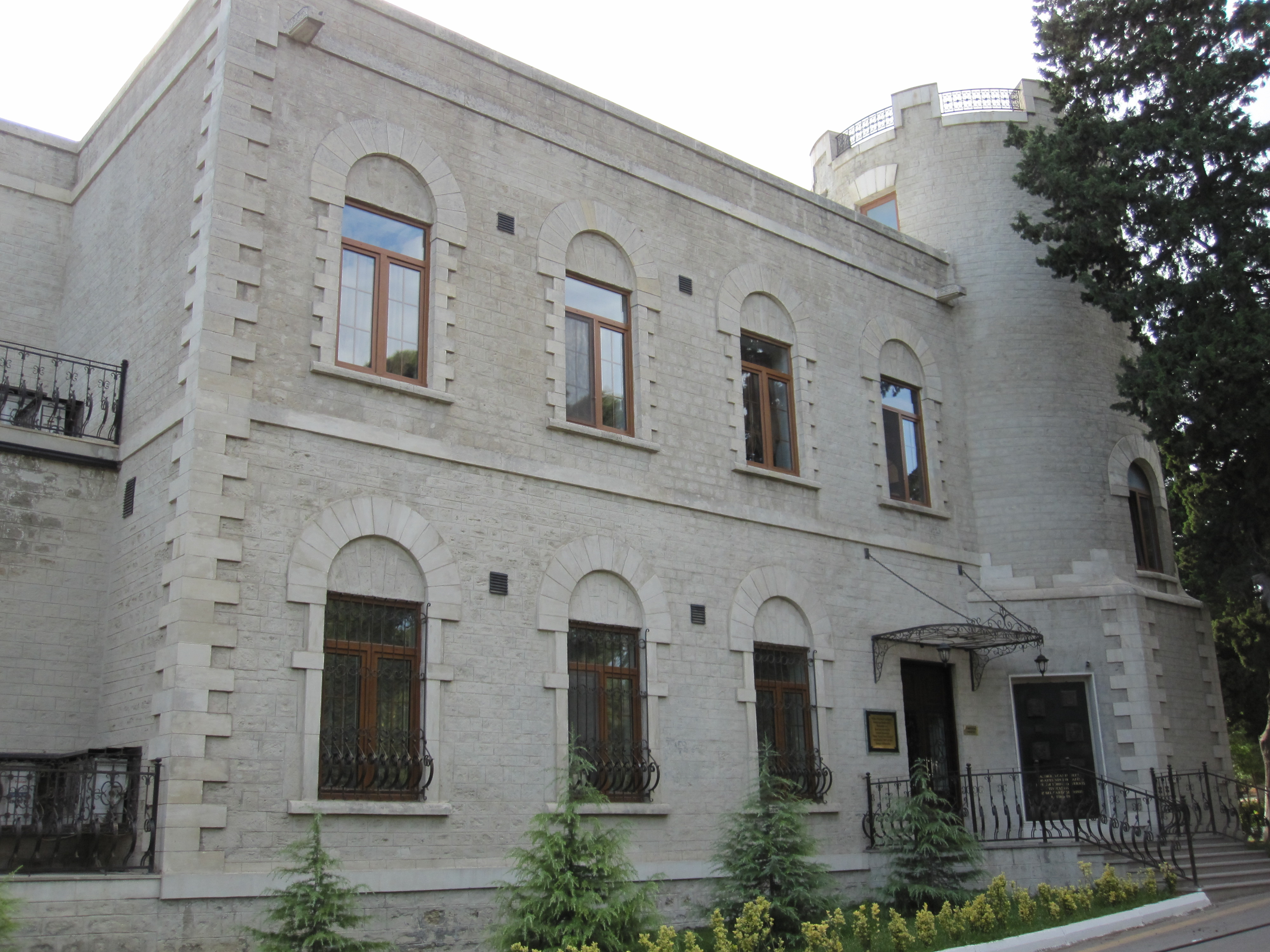
View of the Museum of Nobel Brothers

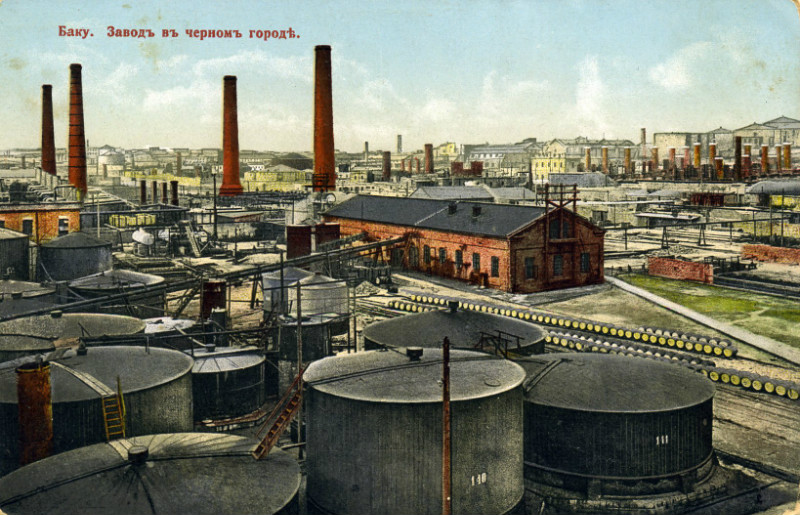
The Keshla oil production factory in 1900

== See also ==
- Baku Tower
- Baku White City
- Villa Petrolea
- List of tallest buildings in Azerbaijan
