= List of tallest buildings in Azerbaijan =

This list of the tallest buildings in Azerbaijan ranks buildings in Azerbaijan by height. The tallest building in Azerbaijan is the Baku Tower in Baku, which is 276.3 m (906 ft) tall.

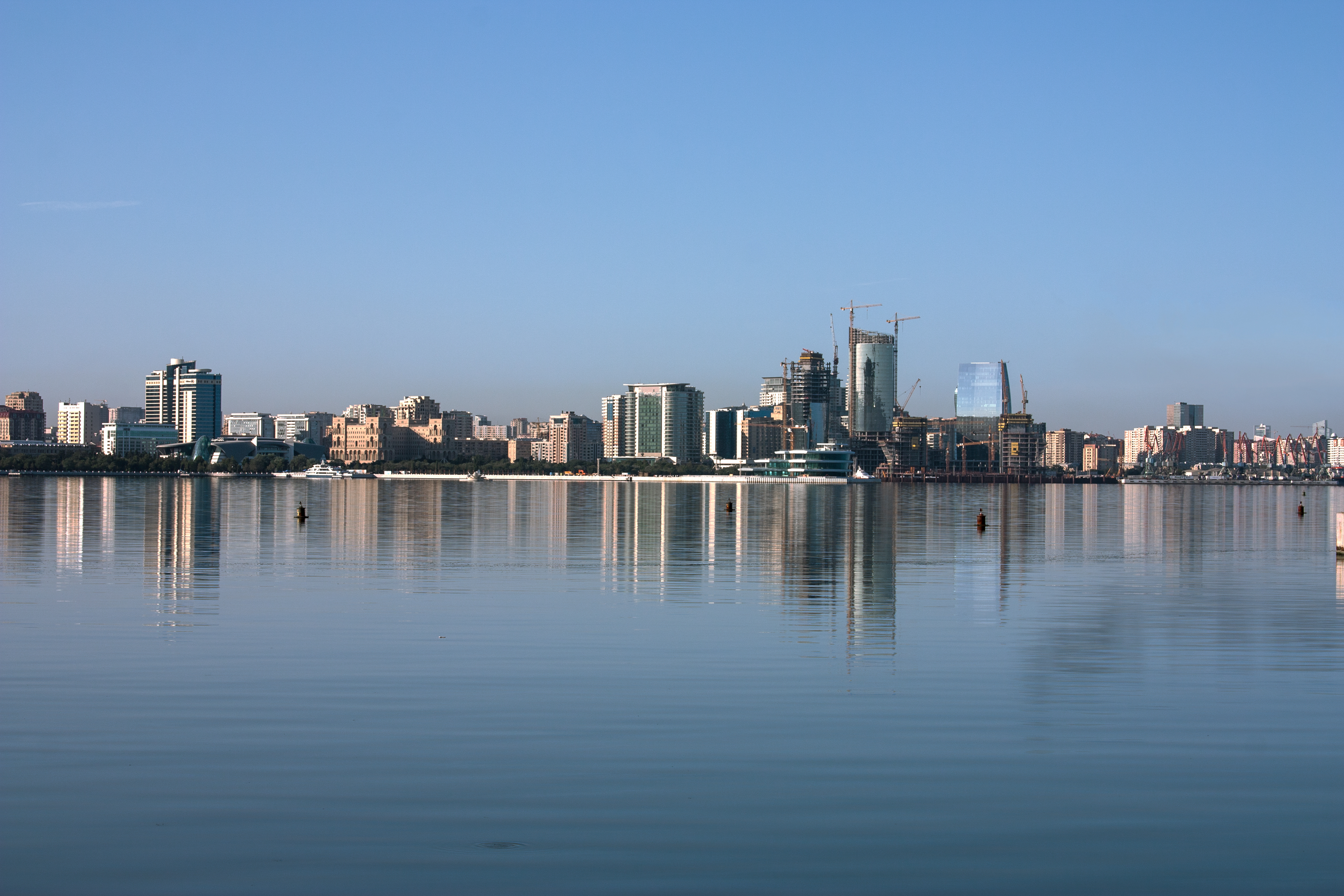
A view of the Bay of Baku

== Tallest buildings ==
Was the tallest building in Azerbaijan upon completion
Indicates buildings that have been topped out but not yet completed

Rank	Name	Image	City	Height m (ft)	Floors	Completion	Notes
1	Baku Tower		Baku	276.3 m (906 ft)	49	2020	Tallest building in Azerbaijan and the Caucasus since 2020.
2	Crescent City Office Building		Baku	210 m (689 ft)	52	2021	
3	SOCAR Tower		Baku	209 m (686 ft)	42	2015	Tallest building in Azerbaijan from 2015 to 2020.
4	Flame Tower 1		Baku	181.8 m (596 ft)	39	2013	Tallest building in Azerbaijan from 2013 to 2015. Tallest residential building in Azerbaijan.
5	The Crescent Place		Baku	170 m (558 ft)	35	2021	
6	Ministry of Taxes	External image	Baku	168.4 m (552 ft)	32	2021	
7	Port Baku North Tower		Baku	167 m (548 ft)	37	2022	
8	Crescent La Luna Hotel Baku		Baku	166 m (545 ft)	36	2022	Tallest hotel in Azerbaijan.
9	Flame Tower 2		Baku	164.6 m (540 ft)	36	2013	
10	Flame Tower 3		Baku	160.8 m (528 ft)	28	2013	
11	SOFAZ Tower		Baku	140 m (459 ft)	24	2014	
12	Port Baku Residence		Baku	135 m (443 ft)	35	2013	
13	The Ritz-Carlton Baku Hotel		Baku	130 m (427 ft)	33	2022	Formerly known as Trump International Hotel & Tower Baku.
14	Chinar Plaza	External image	Baku	129.6 m (425 ft)	35	2015	
15	Azersu Office Tower		Baku	124 m (407 ft)	22	2018	
16	Port Baku South Tower		Baku	120 m (394 ft)	32	2011	Tallest building in Azerbaijan from 2011 to 2013.
17	Property Tower	External image	Baku	114.3 m (375 ft)	32	2018	
18	Demirci Plaza Tower		Baku	107 m (351 ft)	25	2013	
19	Azure Business Tower		Baku	102 m (335 ft)	30	2018	
20	Ganja International Hospital		Ganja	100 m (328 ft)	21	2015	Tallest building in Azerbaijan outside of Baku.
21	JW Marriott Absheron Baku Hotel		Baku	84 m (276 ft)	21	2012	

== Under construction ==
Name	Image	City	Height m (ft)	Floors	Estimated Completion	Notes
Cipriani Tower		Baku	323 m (1,060 ft)	60+	2031	Will become the tallest building in Azerbaijan and the Caucasus region upon completion.
CBA Tower		Baku	164 m (538 ft)	37	2025	Will become the 10th tallest building in Azerbaijan upon completion.
Swissotel Baku		Baku	160 m (525 ft)	35	—	Currently on hold.
Avenue 8		Baku	144 m (472 ft)	30	—	
AzerEnerji Headquarters		Baku	134 m (440 ft)	28	—	Currently on hold.

== Approved or proposed ==
Name	Image	City	Height m (ft)	Floors	Estimated Completion	Status	Notes
Azerbaycan Ulduzu		Baku	700 m (2,297 ft)	—	—	Proposed	
Nakhchivan Tower		Baku	206 m (676 ft)	50	—	Approved	

== Unbuilt ==
Name	Image	City	Height m (ft)	Floors	Cancelled	Notes
Azerbaijan Tower		Baku	1,050 m (3,445 ft)	189	2019	Announced in 2012. Construction began in 2015, but was cancelled in 2019. Would have been the world's tallest building.
Sky Park 3		Baku	240 m (787 ft)	55	—	
Gilan Tower		Baku	215 m (705 ft)	50	—	
Three Towers		Baku	192 m (630 ft)	42	—	
Full Moon Rising		Baku	158 m (518 ft)	35	—	
The Pearl of the World		Baku	114 m (374 ft)	28	—	
