= Shah Abbas Mosque =

Shah Abbas Mosque can refer to:

- Shah Abbas Mosque (Keshla), in Baku, Azerbaijan
- Juma Mosque in Ganja, Azerbaijan, often called Shah Abbas Mosque
- Shah Abbas Mosque in Tbilisi, Georgia, demolished in 1950
- Shah Abbas Mosque in Yerevan, Armenia, a former mosque
