= The Crescent Development Project =

Skyscraper complex in Baku, Azerbaijan

Coordinates: 40°22′26″N 49°51′33″E

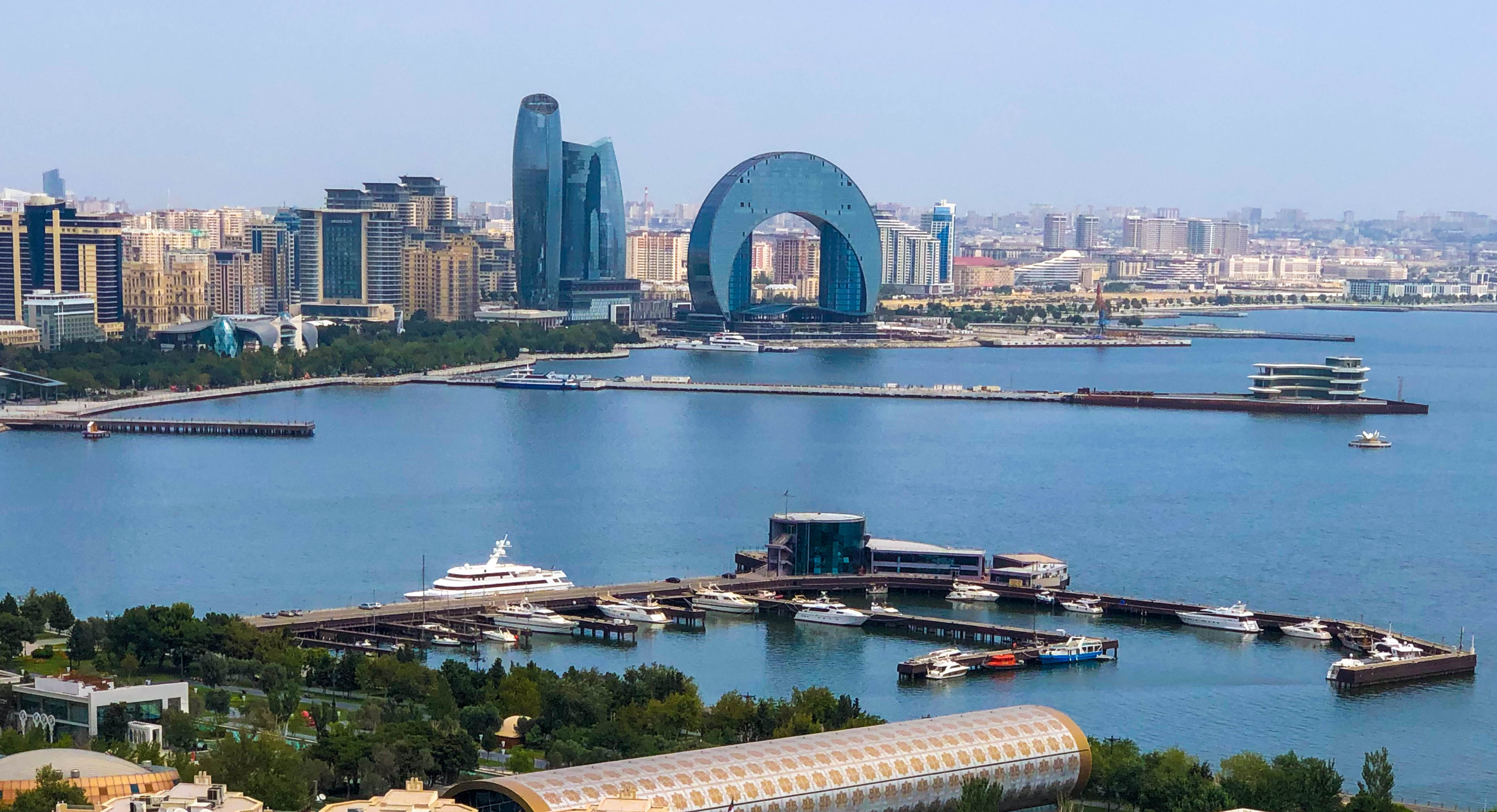

General information
- Status: Completed
- Type: Office, residential, hotel, shopping mall
- Location: Baku, Azerbaijan
- Construction started: October 2009
- Completed: 2022
- Opening: 2023
- Owner: Gilan Construction

Height
- Roof: The Crescent City: 210 m (690 ft); The Crescent Place: 170 m (560 ft); Crescent Hotel: 166 m (545 ft)

Technical details
- Floor count: 52 (The Crescent City) 36 (The Crescent Hotel) 35 (The Crescent Place)

Design and construction
- Architects: DSA Architects International / Heerim Architects & Planners Co. Ltd.
- Main contractor: Gilan Holding

The Crescent Development Project or The Crescent Bay (formerly known as Caspian Plus) is a skyscraper complex under construction on the coast of the Caspian Sea in Baku, Azerbaijan.

The complex includes an offshore hotel (Crescent Hotel), an office tower (Crescent City), a residential tower and a retail and entertainment centre (Crescent Place). The project is intended to be an architectural landmark.

== History ==
In February 2008, skyscrapernews.com, a well-known architectural review website, published an article about two projects designed by Korean firm Heerim Architects for construction in Baku. The projects, both with a lunar theme, were described as "an attempt to reinvent the concept of the skyscraper beyond the traditional". The article described two skyscraper complexes proposed for construction on neighbouring peninsulas, on opposite sides of Baku Bay. The first, Full Moon Bay, was to be built on the western side of the bay. It included a 158-meter, 35-storey disc-shaped hotel called "Palace of the Winds 1 and 2". The second complex, "Caspian Plus", was to be built on the eastern edge of the Baku Bay near the seaport, as a counterpoint to "Full Moon Bay". The second project originally included a 32-storey crescent-shaped hotel (standing on its "horns" offshore), four high-rise residential buildings and a 43-storey, 203-meter-tall commercial centre (now called the Crescent City Tower). The fate of these projects remained uncertain until October 2009, when foundation work began on the site of the Caspian Plus complex.

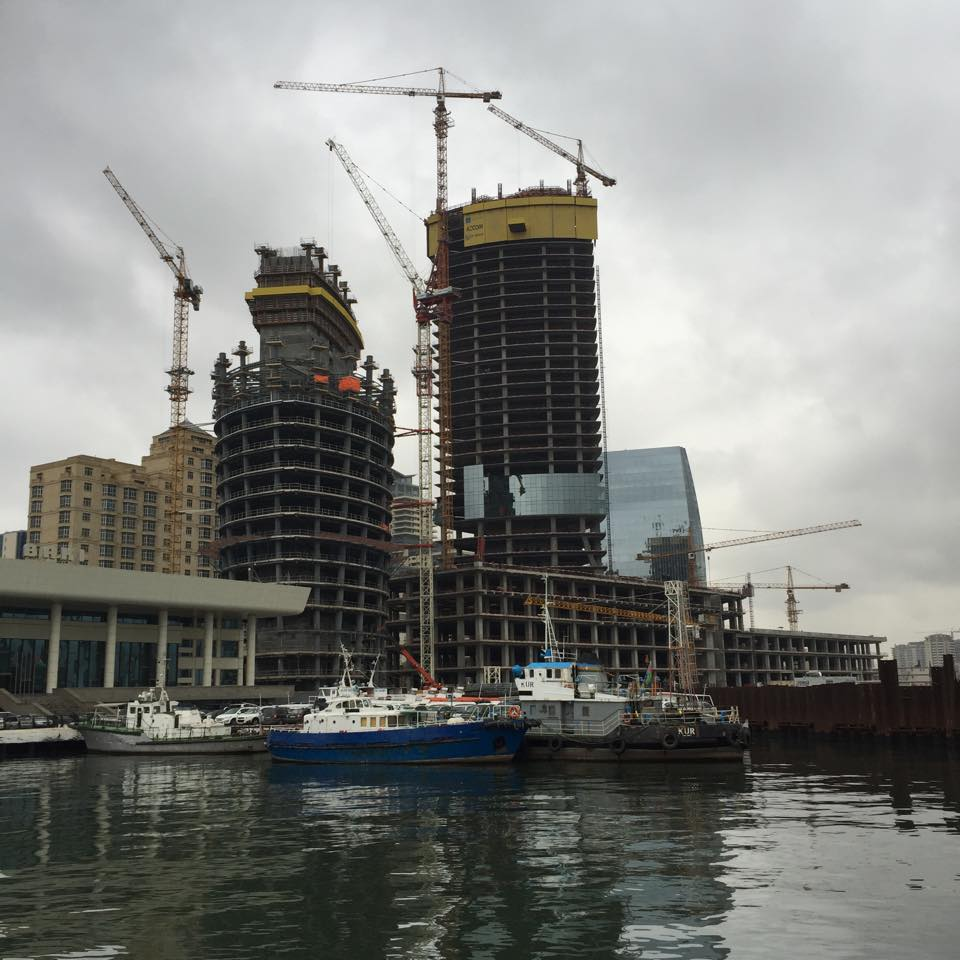
Construction in 2015

The project has since been modified. A trio of high-rise residential buildings were removed to avoid visual overlap with two other buildings (Port Baku Towers and Port Baku Residence). After modification, the project consisted of a hotel ("The Crescent Hotel"), an office tower ("The Crescent City") and a residential tower with a podium ("The Crescent Place"). The previous name of the project, "Caspian Plus", was changed to "The Crescent Development Project".

The Full Moon Bay project was cancelled.

== Project ==
Part of the Crescent Development Project will be located on Baku's waterfront. An offshore part, including "The Crescent Hotel", will be located on an artificial island about 170 meters from the shore. An office tower ("The Crescent City") and a residential tower with a podium ("The Crescent Place") will be built on the shoreline behind "The Crescent Hotel".

=== The Crescent Hotel ===
The Crescent Hotel is an arched building. It is designed to look like a crescent moon with its points on the surface of the Caspian Sea. The crescent shape of the building refers to one of the symbols of Azerbaijan depicted on its national flag. The skyscraper's crescent-shaped configuration will not affect the interior of the hotel, as the building will rely on two multi-storey, column-like towers that will create additional space and act as supports for the hotel. These supporting towers are called the Eastern and Western towers, according to their location. The Crescent Hotel has 32 storeys (28 storeys of the hotel itself above a 4-storey podium). When completed, the hotel will have 230 guest rooms, 74 apartments and 16 villas. The total area is 177,969 m²^{2}, parking is planned for 601 cars. The Crescent Hotel will be connected to the shore and other buildings in the development by a bridge. This hotel is planned to be a 'seven-star' facility.

=== The Crescent City ===
The office tower, "The Crescent City", is a 210-meter skyscraper with 43 above-ground floors. It is being built behind "The Crescent Hotel" on the waterfront next to Baku's seaport and the JW Marriott Absheron. According to the project design, the facade of the building is cylindrical and slightly flattened in the north-south direction. The bottom of the tower is narrow and the tower widens as it approaches the top, which has a concave notch. The shape of The Crescent City is designed to resemble a torch.

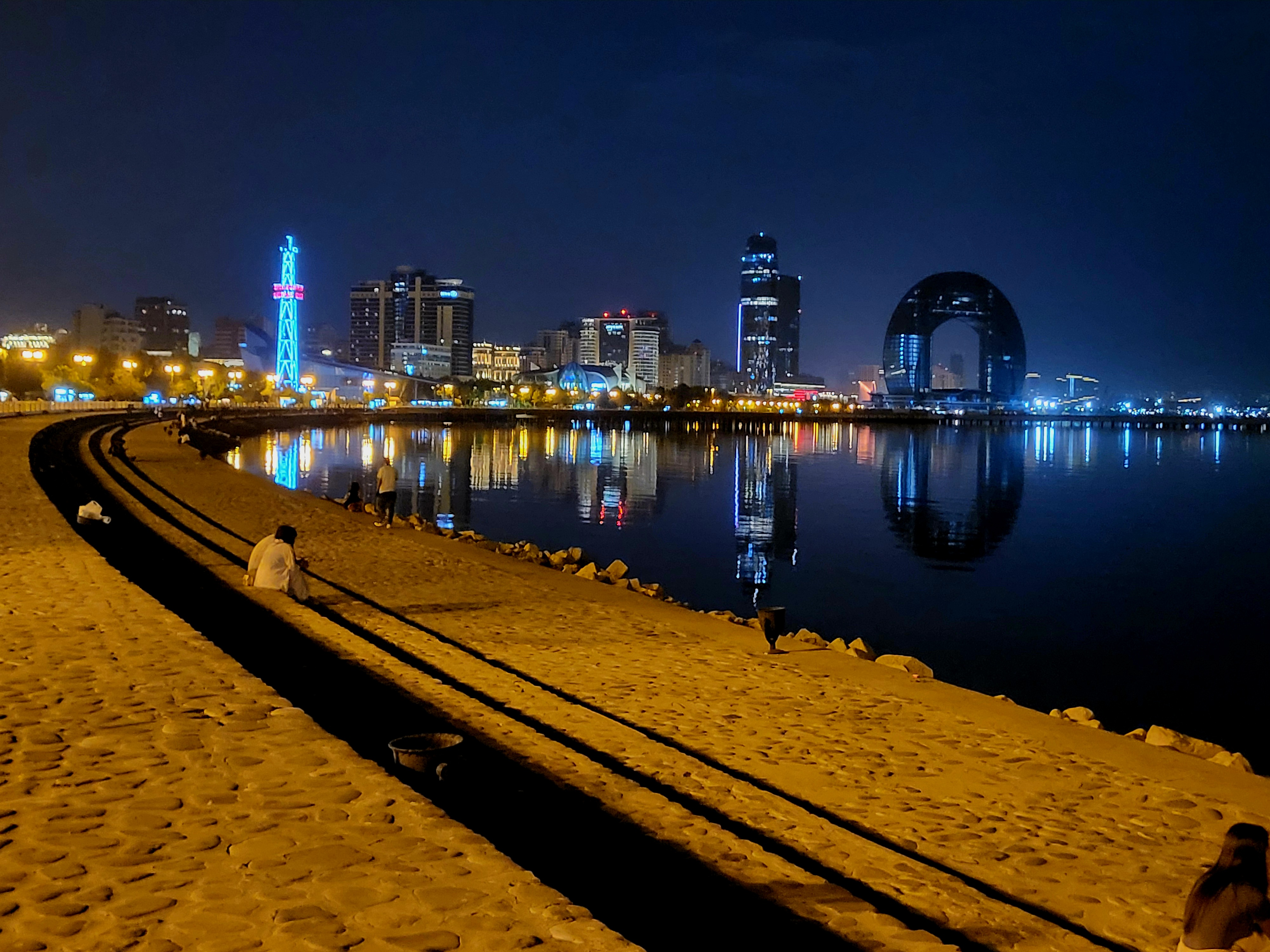
The project at night

=== The Crescent Place ===
The Crescent Place consists of 3 underground levels and 32 above ground levels: a 5-storey podium, 2 levels of townhouses and a 25-storey residential tower with 2 additional penthouse levels. The Crescent Place will be located onshore next to the tower of The Crescent City. This 170 meter high residential building will contain 168 apartments. The total area of the Crescent Place is 273,000 m^{2}, with space for approximately 100 retail outlets and an additional 40 food and beverage units.

== Construction ==
According to a report published by the management company, as of November 2013, almost all of the piling for the project had been completed. Nine percent of the total project had been constructed. Ten percent of the coastal portion of the project had been completed. In July 2015, DSA Architects International was appointed to provide multidisciplinary lead design services for the Crescent Development Project, with construction underway.

=== Site of The Crescent Hotel ===
The site for The Crescent Hotel is located in an area of the Caspian Sea. In May 2012, sheet piling began. These piles were installed in two rows around the perimeter of the future hotel site. A double metal fence was then installed around the site to restrict any additional water entering the area. Once the fence was completed, the water was pumped from the site and filled with sand to create the foundation for the building. As of early 2013, the soil creating the artificial island has been formed, and the foundations for the west and east towers have been completed. The piles constructed for The Crescent Hotel, with a diameter of 1500-2000 mm and a length of 76.1 metere, are the largest ever constructed in Azerbaijan. It was planned to construct 464 piles by the end of 2013. By the beginning of 2015, development of the East and West Towers had begun on the artificial island.

Due to the complex geometry of the building, a number of contractors from around the world were involved in the construction. Many of them faced challenges in achieving their objectives. For example, Derby Design Engineering said that the main challenge was to design a constructible solution for the connecting bridge between the column-like towers. This arch has a span of 90 meters and supports 5 hotel floors which are suspended from the link-bridge truss. According to the Koltay Facades website, the curved sides of the hotel present an exciting challenge for engineers and designers; from floor to floor, the inclination of the glass changes, and so do the components of the reaction forces on the slab, the appearance of the glass, the safety requirements amongst the others.

=== Sites of The Crescent City and Crescent Place ===
Construction of the onshore foundations began in October 2009. For all parts of the shoreline (The Crescent City and The Crescent Place sites), 691 short piles with a diameter of 1.2m and a depth of 26m were installed. For The Crescent City tower, 118 deep piles (diameter 1500 mm, depth of 52-61,5 meters) were constructed.

By November 2013, 4 taps had been installed at The Crescent Place site. The first floors of the podium were visible above the fence. Construction of The Crescent Place residential tower had begun. By early 2015, the 16th to 17th floors of The Crescent City Tower were under construction.

By March 2014, the foundation of The Crescent City Tower was ready for concrete core pouring. By early 2015, the Crescent City Tower was being constructed on 16-17 floors. In August 2015, the concrete core of the building reached the 30th level. In December 2015, the final 43rd floor of Crescent City's concrete core was completed.

=== Completion ===
According to a spokesperson for Ilk Construction, completion of the shell and core of The Crescent Place had been scheduled for January 2015; with completion of the entire project due by the second half of 2017. However, for several years, technical difficulties prevented completion of the arch section connecting the two towers. The main crescent structure was completed in 2024 but without opening to the public.

== Gallery ==
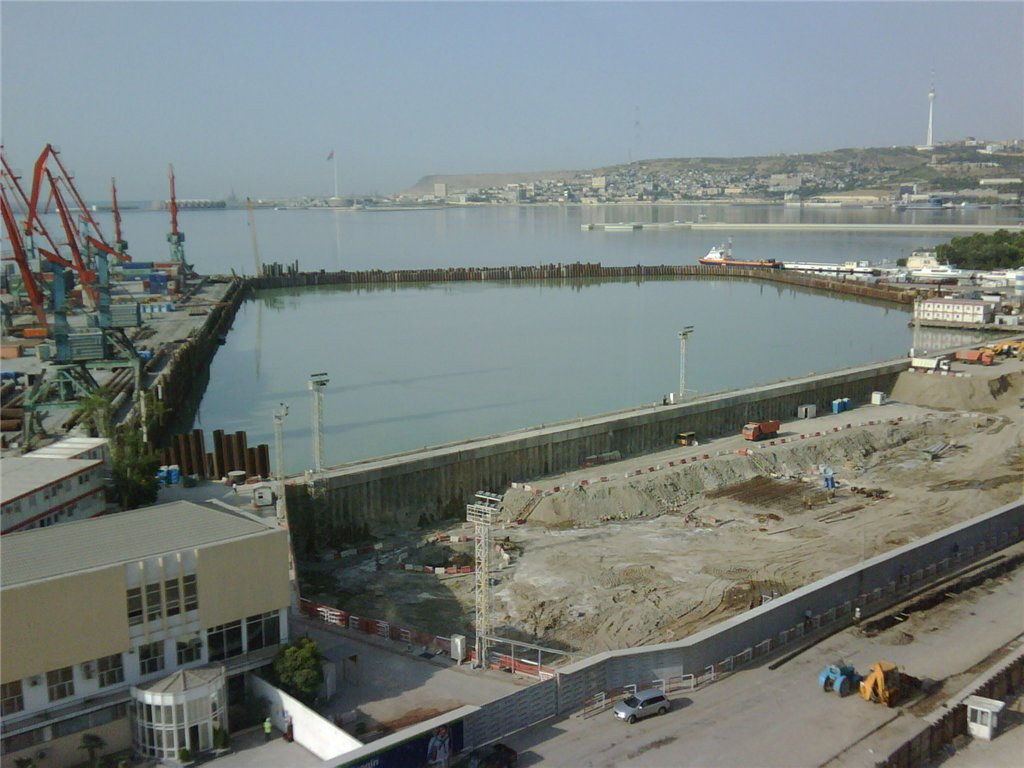
Construction site (01.08.2012): The fenced-off area of the sea designated for The Crescent Hotel could be seen; piling work was underway for the onshore part of the project

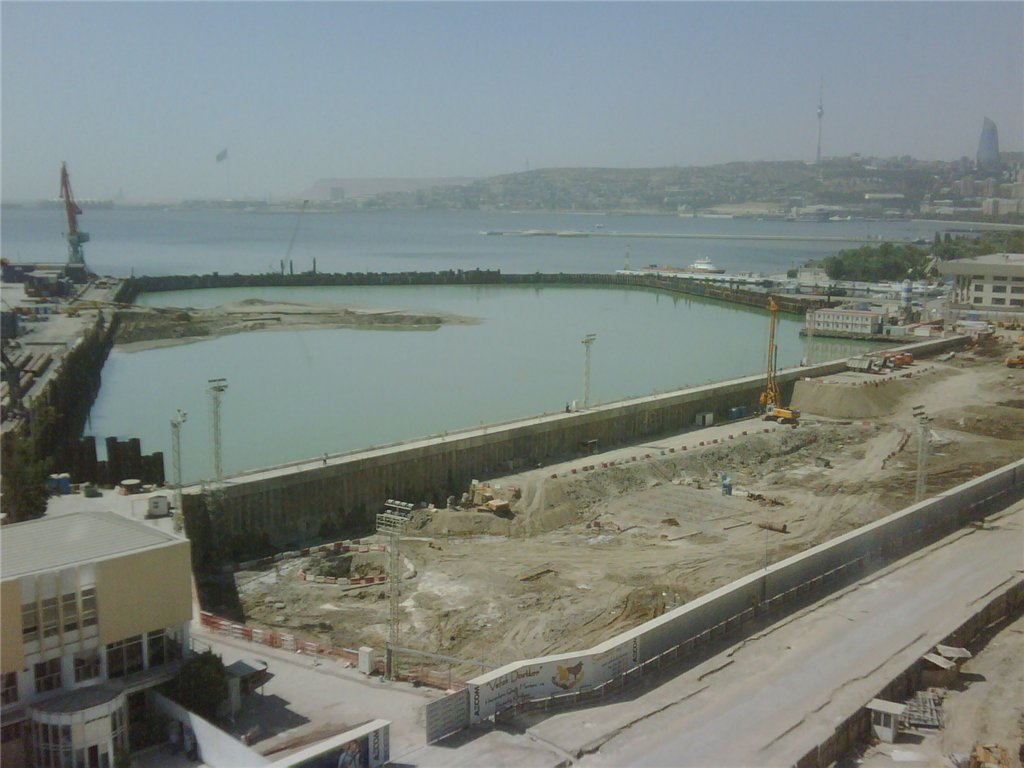
Construction site (17.08.2012): Offshore site was filled with sand in order to create artificial island

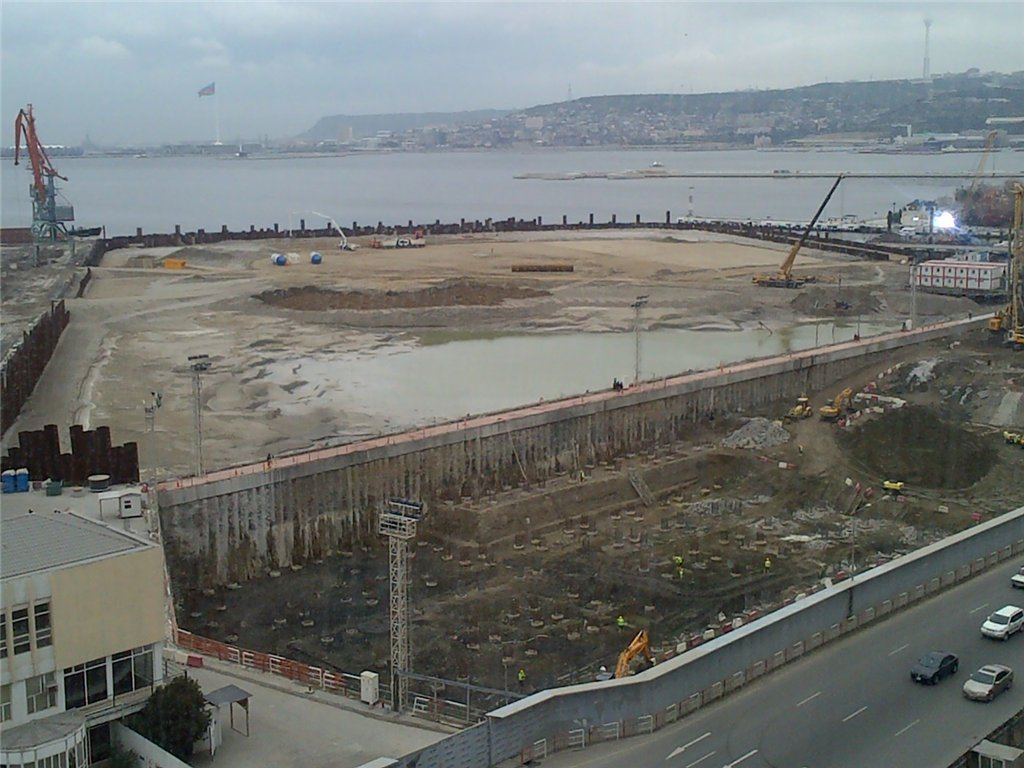
Construction site (01.03.2013): An island had been created, pile testing started on it; piling work for the onshore part was completed

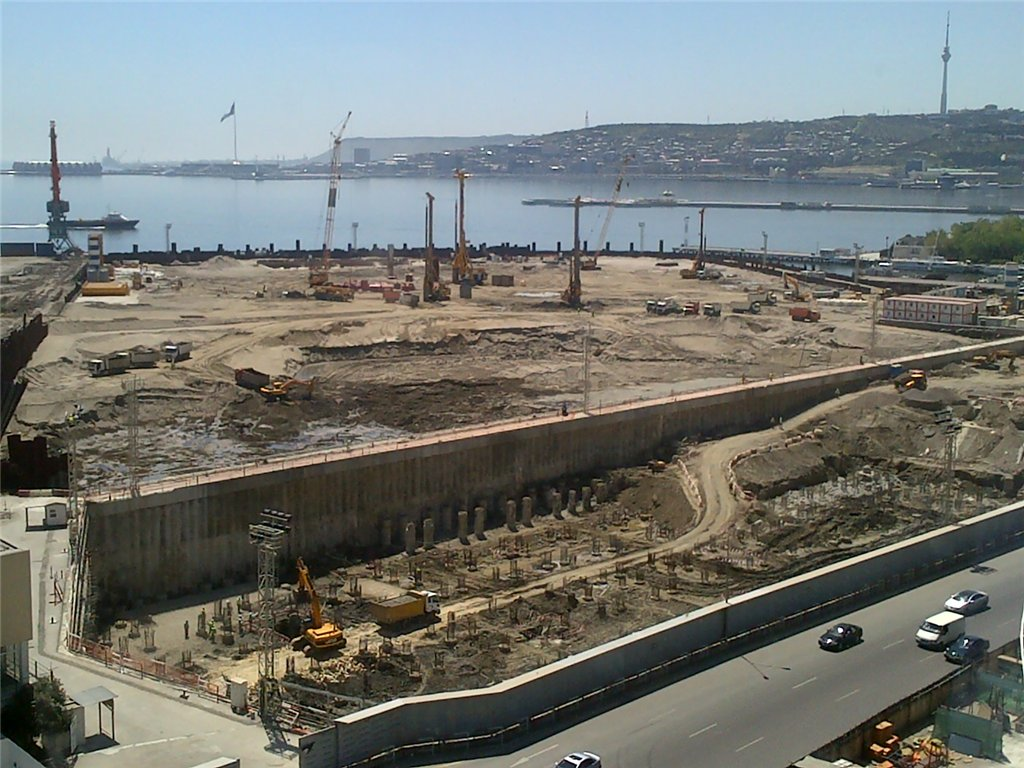
Construction site (30.04.2013): Start of piling on the island; onshore section ready for construction of podium

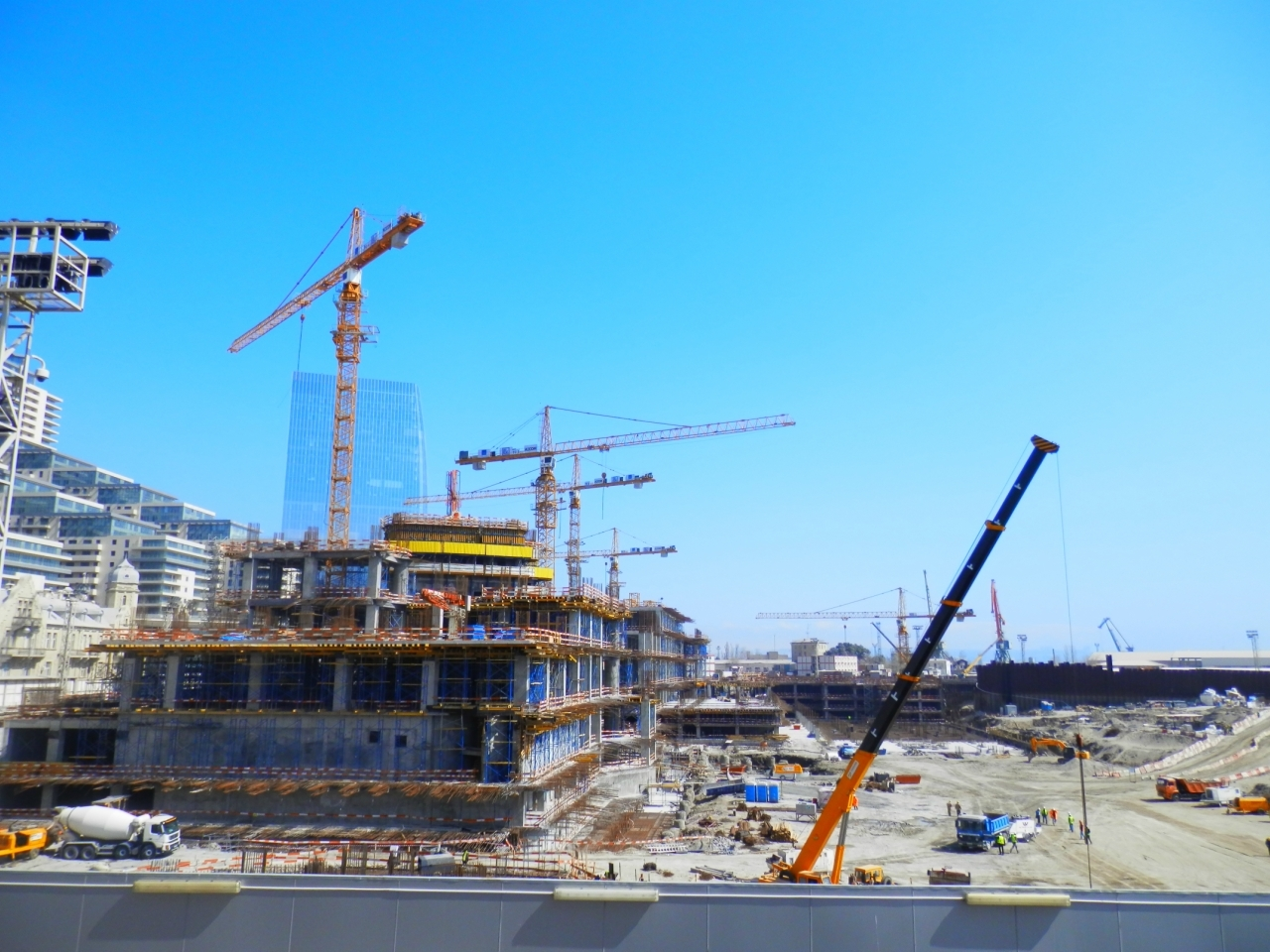
Construction site (18.03.2014): Podium, Crescent Place concrete core rising, car park

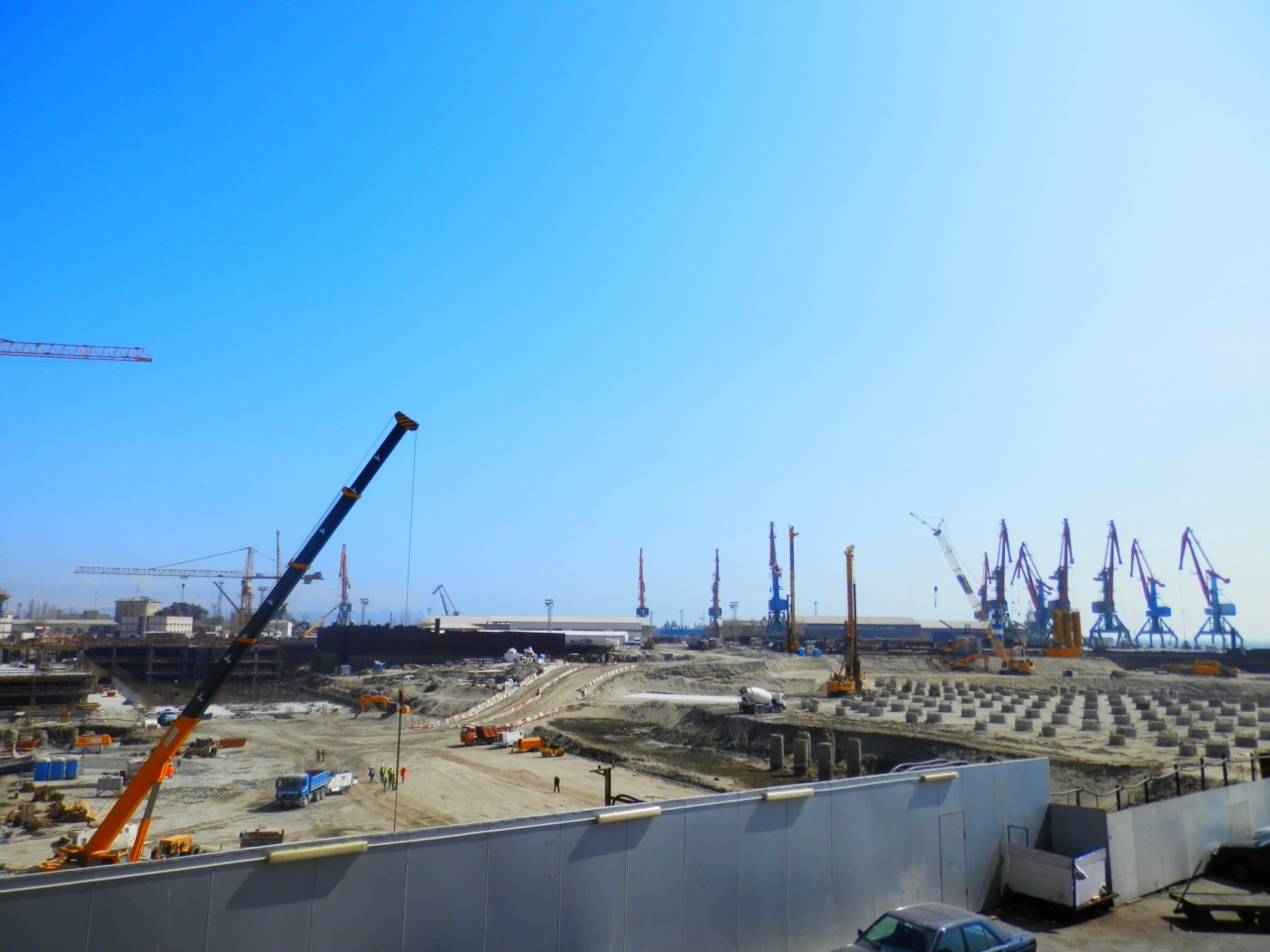
Completion of piling works for The Crescent Hotel on artificial island (18.03.2014)

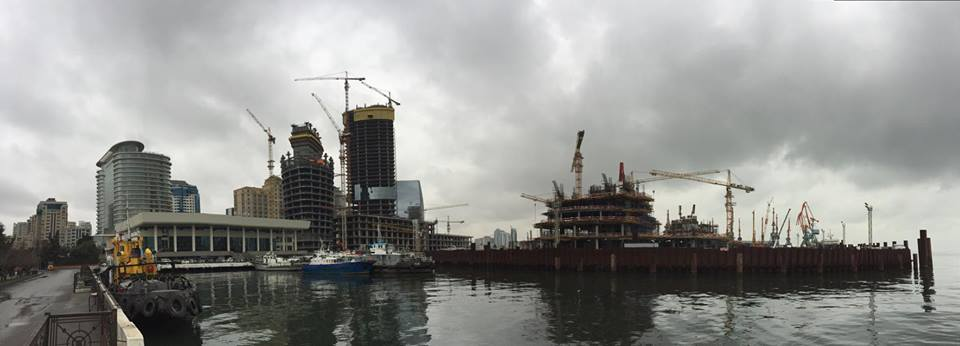
February 2015: General view of the project, Crescent Place topped out, Crescent City built on 18-19 levels, first floors of The Crescent Hotel's towers built on the island

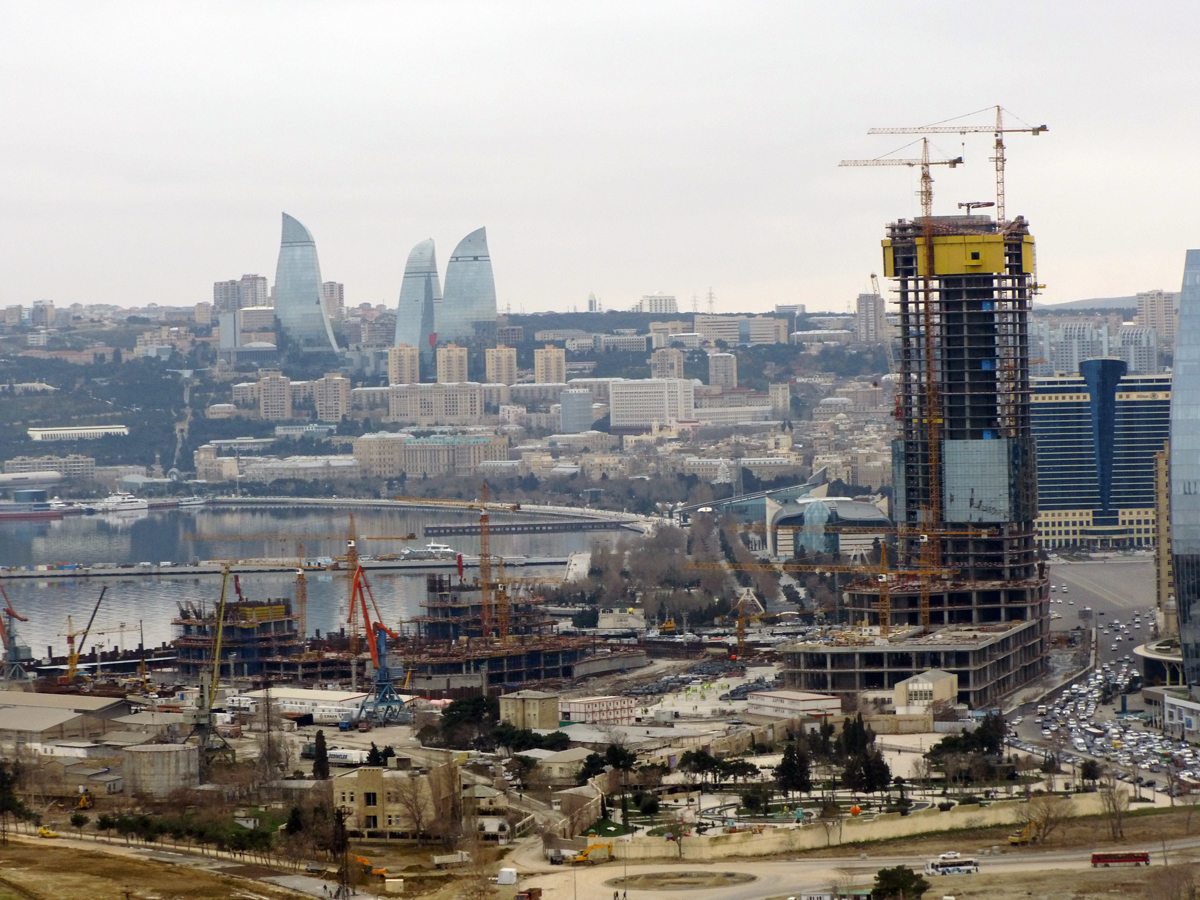
March 2015: View of The Crescent Place and the Crescent Hotel

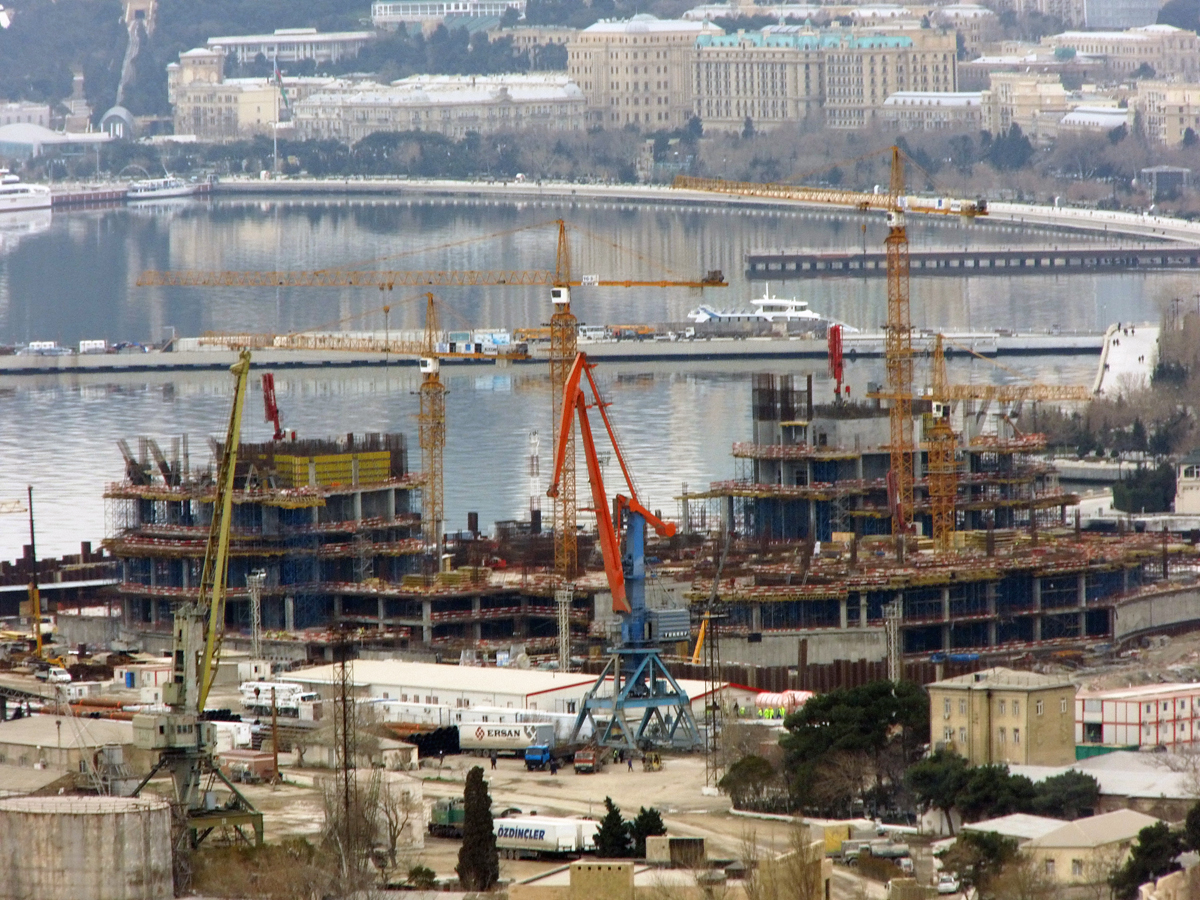
March 2015: Construction of The Crescent Hotel
