= Shah Abbas Mosque (Keshla) =

Mosque in Baku, Azerbaijan

- Azerbaijani: Şah Abbas Məscidi
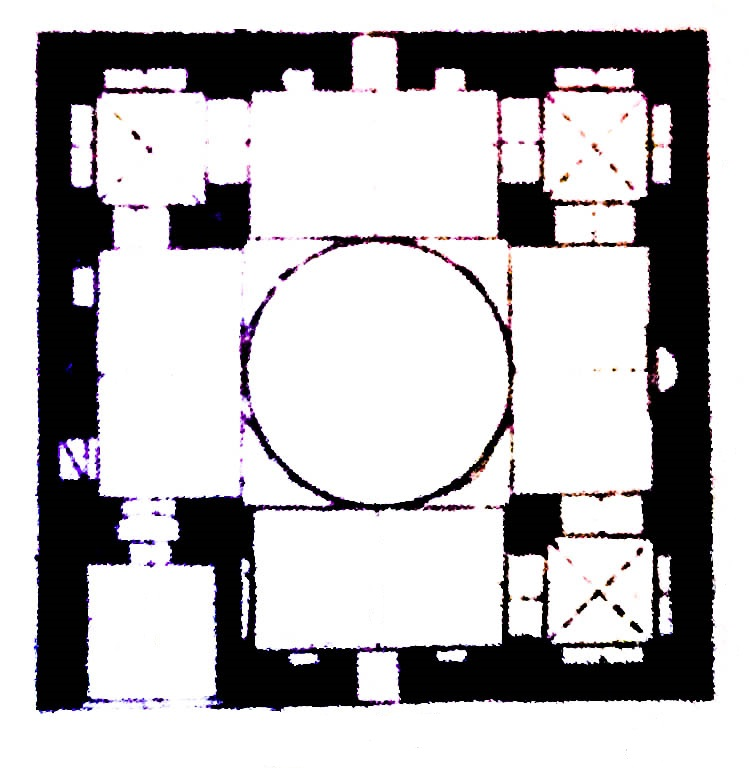
- The floorpan of the mosque

- Location of the mosque in Baku

Religion
- Affiliation: Islam
- Ecclesiastical or organizational status: Mosque (17th century–1928); Profane use (1928–1989); Mosque (since 1989)
- Status: Active

Location
- Location: Baku
- Country: Azerbaijan
- Interactive map of Shah Abbas Mosque
- Coordinates: 40°23′51″N 49°53′41″E

Architecture
- Type: Mosque architecture
- Style: Shirvan-Absheron
- Completed: 17th century

Specifications
- Dome: One (maybe more)
- Materials: Stone

The Shah Abbas Mosque (Azerbaijani: Şah Abbas Məscidi) is a mosque in the Keshla settlement of the Nizami district of Baku, Azerbaijan. The mosque of Keshla village is a monument of the 17th century and was built by the order of the Safavid Persian king Shah Abbas.

== Architectural features ==
According to the plan, the Shah Abbas Mosque in Keshla has a square shape. It repeats the scheme typical for the mosques of the Shirvan-Absheron architectural school, and is similar to the Tuba Shakhi mosque in the Mardakan settlement (1481). In the center of the edifice, the main worship hall is built, consisting of four large arches which are connected to the round dome of the mosque. Small rooms with arched ceilings are built on the sides of the building. These rooms are the ones that give the plan a square shape.

The portal of the mosque is simple in its architectural structure and does not have a stalactite half-dome. The architect tried to link the portal section with the overall volume of the building. To this end, the architect used the method of combining the portal frame with the eaves of the edifice. This technique was also applied during the construction of the Divan Khane. There is an Arabic inscription above the portal.

The altar and pulpit are made of hewn massive stone. The windows of the mosque are made with great skill. The first layer of windows consists of two layers: the first - wood, and the second - hewn stone.

After Soviet occupation in Azerbaijan in 1920, the religious struggle of the Bolsheviks began. Like many other religious institutions, the Shah Abbas Mosque ceased to function and resumed its activities only in 1989.

== See also ==
- Islam in Azerbaijan
- List of mosques in Azerbaijan
- List of mosques in Baku
