= SOCAR Tower =

Building in Azerbaijan

General information
- Status: Completed
- Type: Headquarters
- Architectural style: Structural expressionism
- Location: Heydar Aliyev Avenue, Baku, Azerbaijan
- Coordinates: 40.4055158°N 49.8814638°E
- Construction started: 2010
- Completed: 2016
- Opening: 2016
- Cost: US$ 406.5m
- Owner: SOCAR

Height
- Architectural: 209 m (686 ft)

Technical details
- Floor count: 42 (2 underground + 38 overhead dwelling + 2 overhead attic)
- Floor area: 100,000 m^{2} (1,100,000 sq ft)

Design and construction
- Architects: Heerim Architects & Planners Co. Ltd.
- Developer: SOCAR
- Main contractor: Tekfen Construction and Installation

SOCAR Tower is a skyscraper in Baku, Azerbaijan. It is the 3rd tallest building in Baku and in Azerbaijan. The skyscraper serves as the headquarters of SOCAR (State Oil Company of the Azerbaijan Republic). It is one of Baku's major landmarks, along with the Flame Towers.

Construction began in 2010 and was completed in 2016. It was the tallest building in Baku until it was surpassed by the Port Baku Towers.

== Design ==
Designed by Heerim Architects of South Korea, the building is an example of structural expressionism. The building looks like two towers that curve around each other as they rise, according to skyscraper.com, "the seemingly shorter tower almost looks like it's resting its head on the chest of the taller tower. The taller towers peak slightly, bending over it in a confident, reassuring and comforting manner". The tower is 209 m (686 ft) high and has 42 floors, covering an area of 12,000 m^{2} (130,000 sq ft) and providing 100,000 m^{2} (1,100,000 sq ft) of usage area. The headquarters is primarily office space, but also includes conference and sports facilities, a guest house, retail space and food outlets.

The design of the building is based on a composite system of steel construction (manufactured by the Permasteelisa Group) with reinforced concrete walls. The building is designed to withstand wind speeds of 190 km/h (120 mph) and an earthquake measuring nine on the Richter scale.

The building, designed by the South Korean company Heerim Architects & Planners Co. Ltd, based on the concept of "wind and fire", was built by the Turkish company Tekfen Construction and Installation.

== Gallery ==
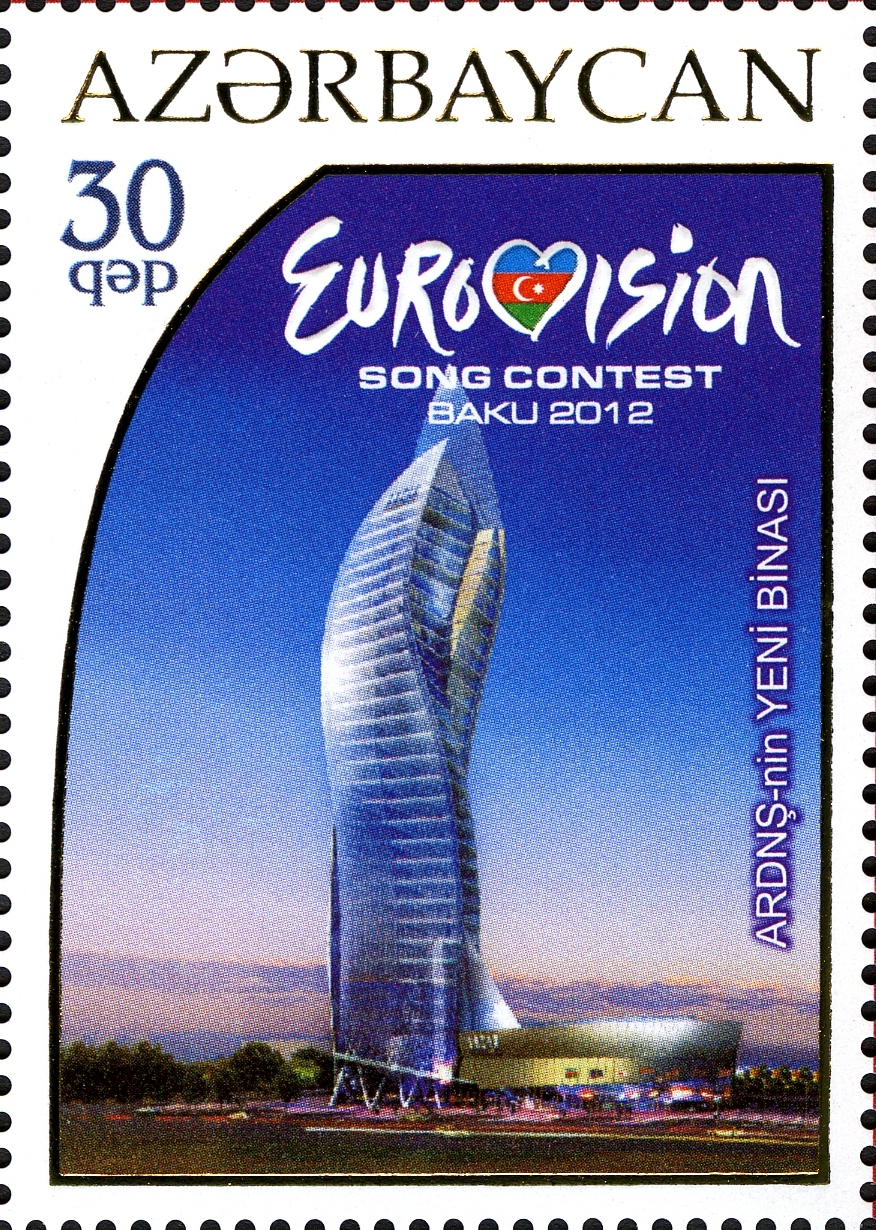
SOCAR Tower on an Azerbaijani stamp

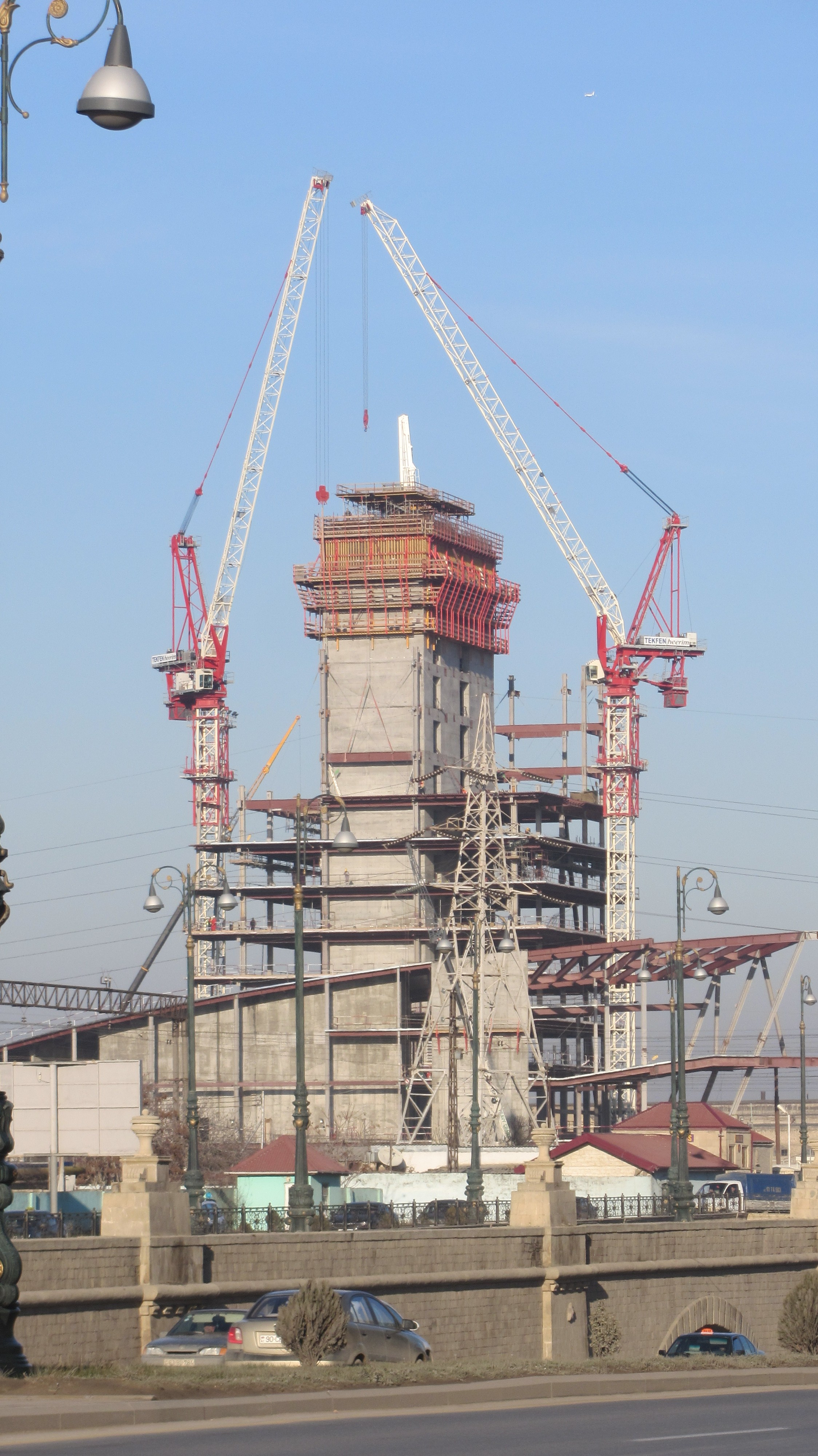
Construction on 12 January 2013; shot 1

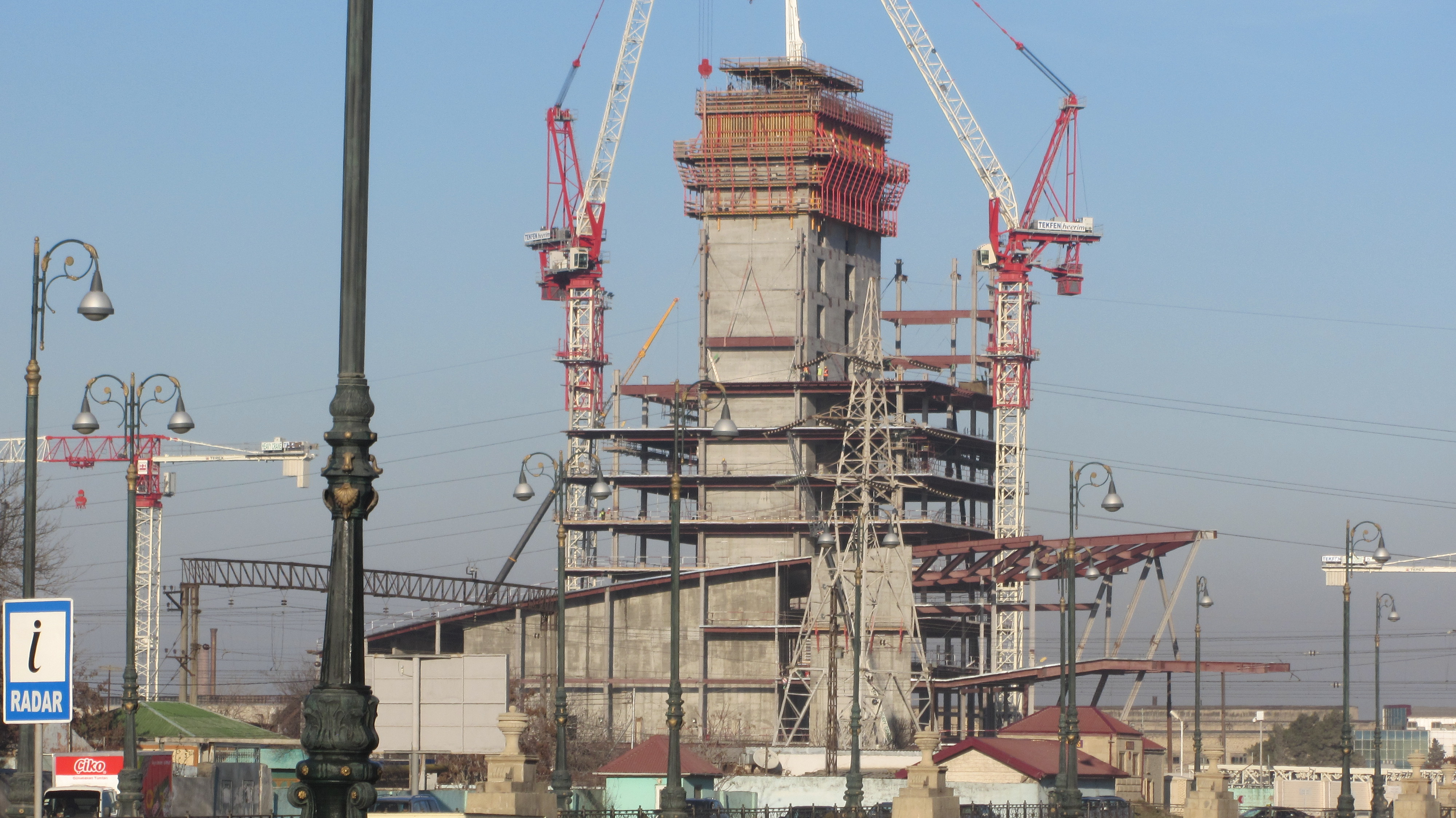
Construction on 12 January 2013; shot 2

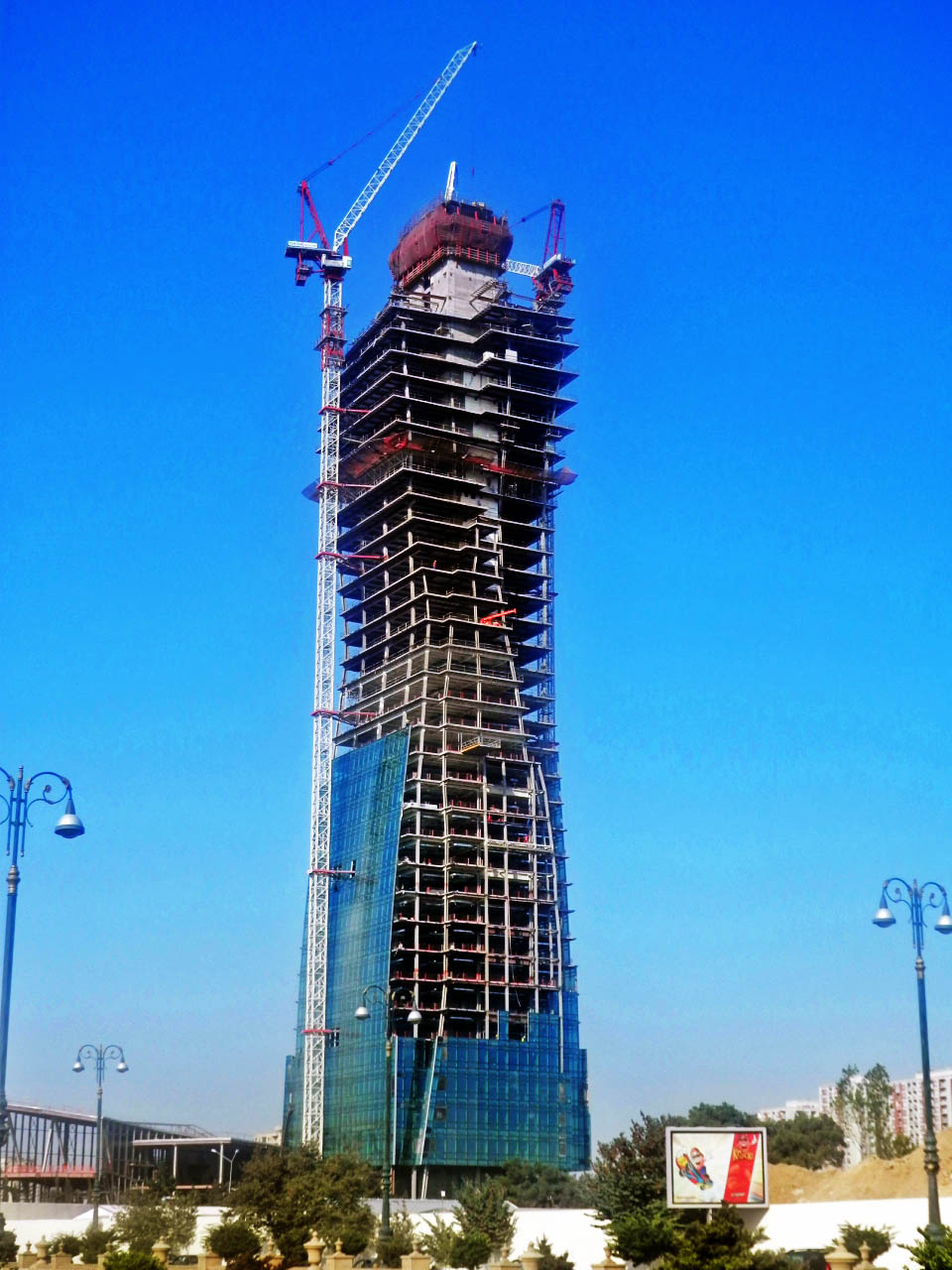
August 2013: Construction of 37th story of the core

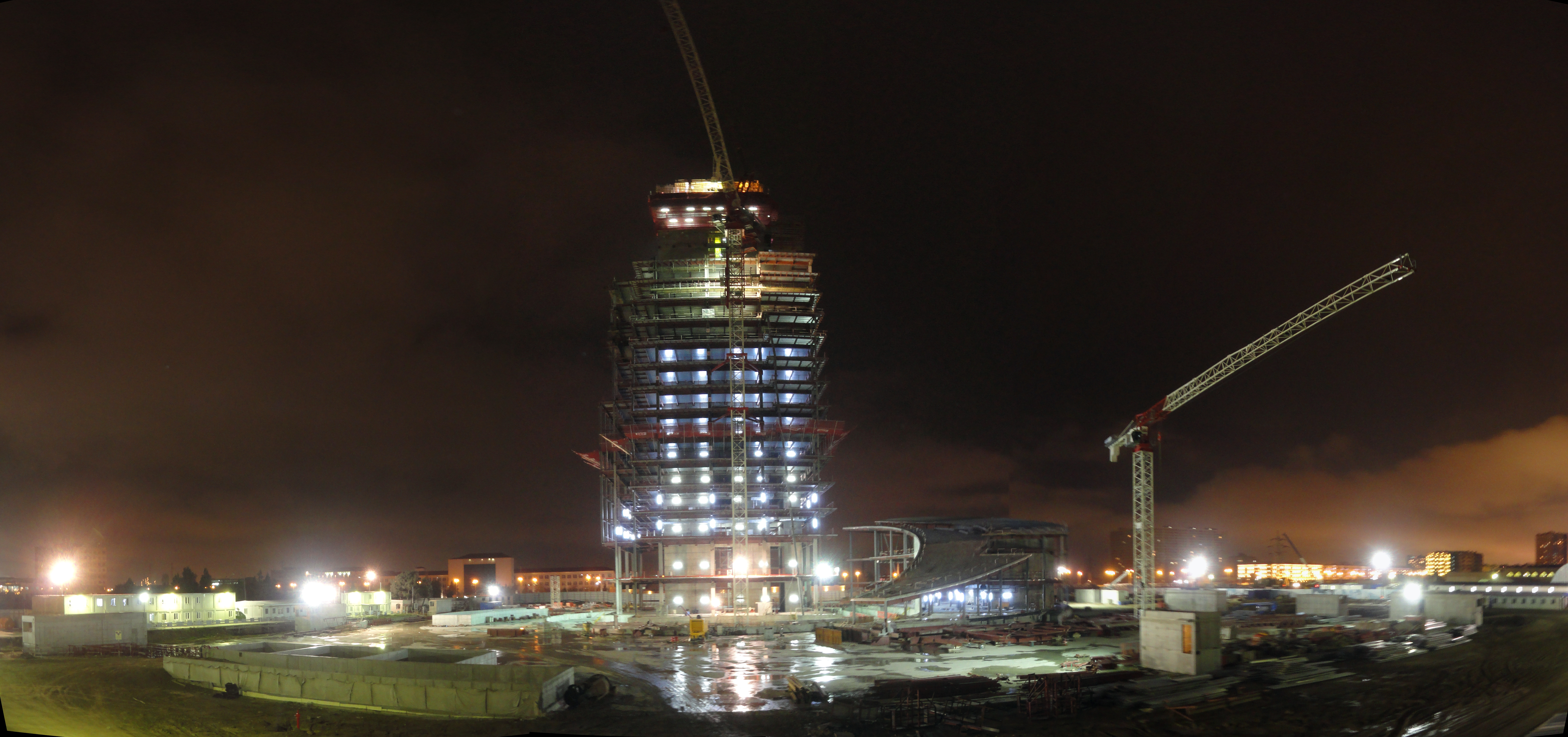
23 February 2013: 19th floor of concrete core construction

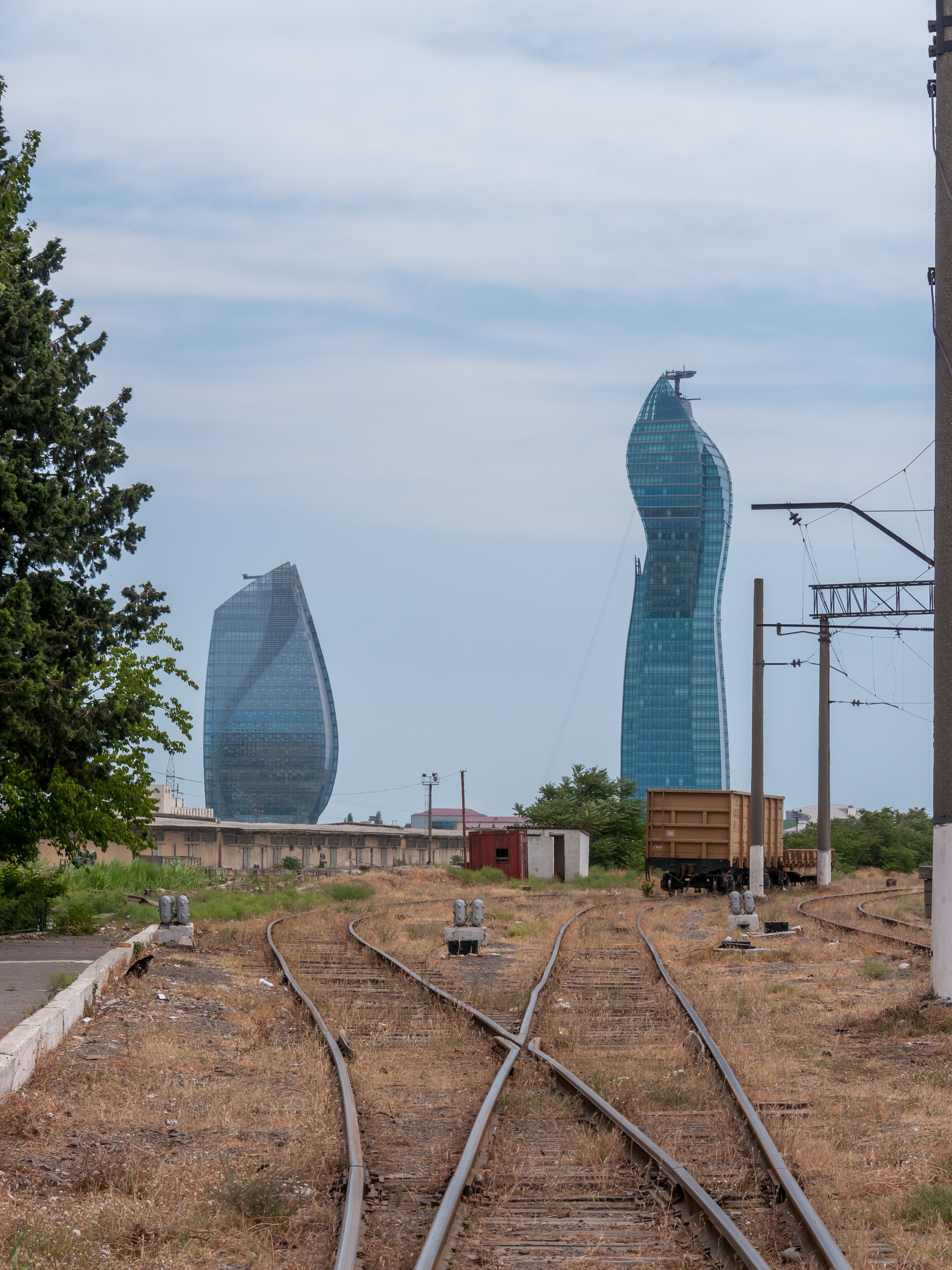
SOCAR Tower (at right) seen from rail yard

== See also ==
- List of twisted buildings
