= Port Baku Towers =

Coordinates: 40.3756°N 49.8600°E

General information
- Type: High-rise office buildings
- Architectural style: High-rise, Glass, Modern architecture
- Location: Baku, Azerbaijan
- Construction started: 2006
- Opening: 2011; 15 years ago
- Owner: Pasha Construction

Height
- Roof: 120 m (390 ft) (Southern Tower) / 167 m (548 ft) (Northern Tower)

Technical details
- Floor count: 32 (Southern Tower) / 37 (Northern Tower)

Design and construction
- Architect: Chapman Taylor Architects
- Main contractor: PASHA Construction LLC

The Port Baku Towers are a pair of high-rise office buildings in Baku, located on Neftchilar Avenue adjacent to the city's seaport. The complex consists of two towers, the North Tower and the South Tower, with 32 and 37 floors, respectively.

== Architecture ==
The buildings are designed in the modern architectural style. The taller tower is designed in the form of a triangular prism with distinct lower and upper bases. Owing to this geometry, the appearance of the South Tower varies depending on the viewing angle. From the eastern and western parts of the city, it appears as a flat rectangular structure, while from the north it takes on a more cylindrical appearance. When viewed from the south of Baku, the sides of the building converge along the edge of the prism.

According to skyscrapernews.com, the form of the South Tower has been compared to that of the Flatiron Building in New York City, a skyscraper constructed in the early 20th century. Unlike the Flatiron Building, however, the upper floors of the Port Baku South Tower gradually taper toward the top, creating a subtle convexity at the center of the structure. This geometric approach reduces the number of structural beams required at higher levels, allowing the facade to maintain a consistent blue cladding that provides high reflectivity during daylight hours and a crystal-like transparency at night.

== Usage ==
The buildings comprise Class A office space, retail outlets, an international spa and wellness center, as well as restaurants and cafés. The complex also includes parking facilities for approximately 1,200 vehicles.

== Gallery ==
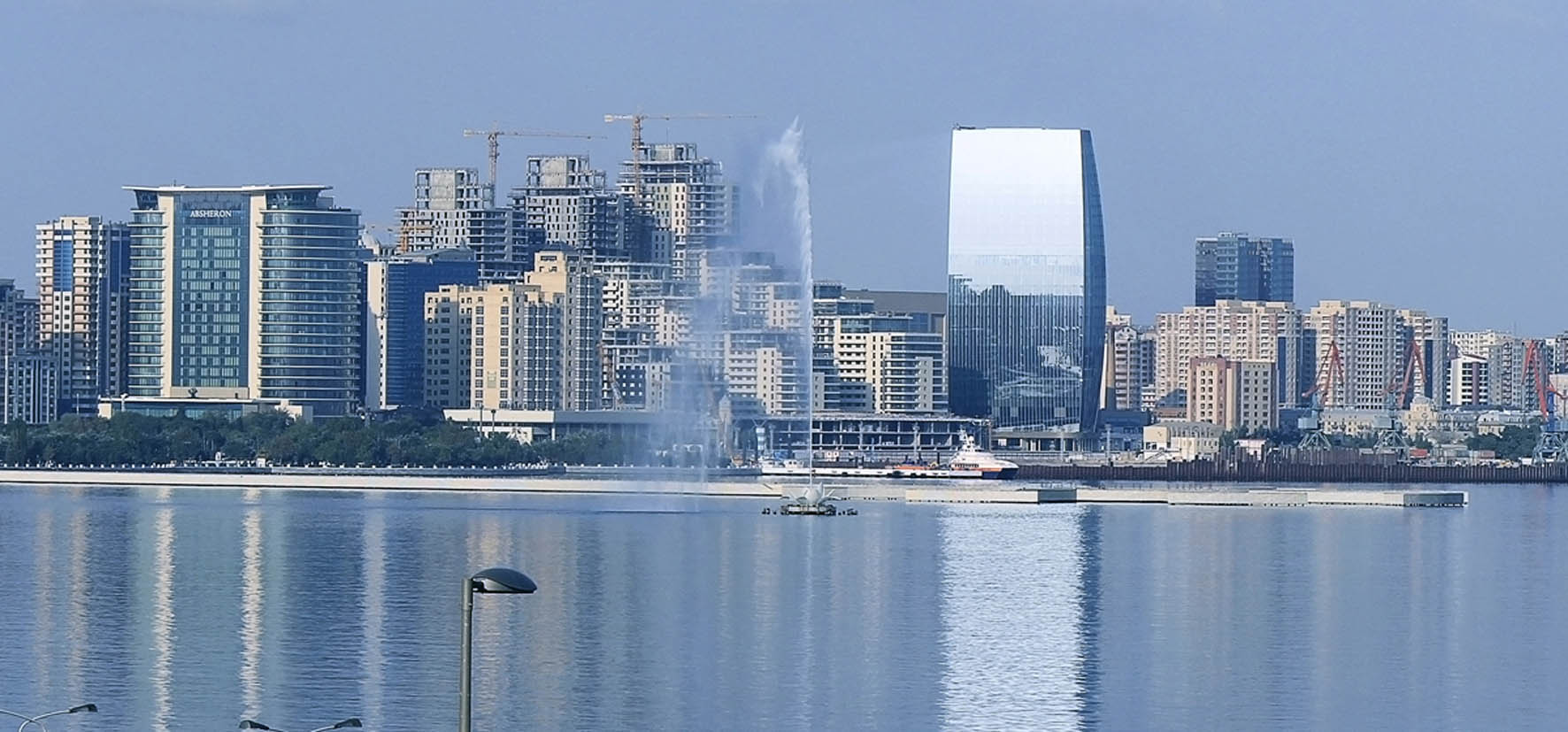
Port Baku South Tower on the right side

Port Baku South Tower seen from Southern Part of Baku
