= Baku Tower =

Skyscraper in Baku, Azerbaijan

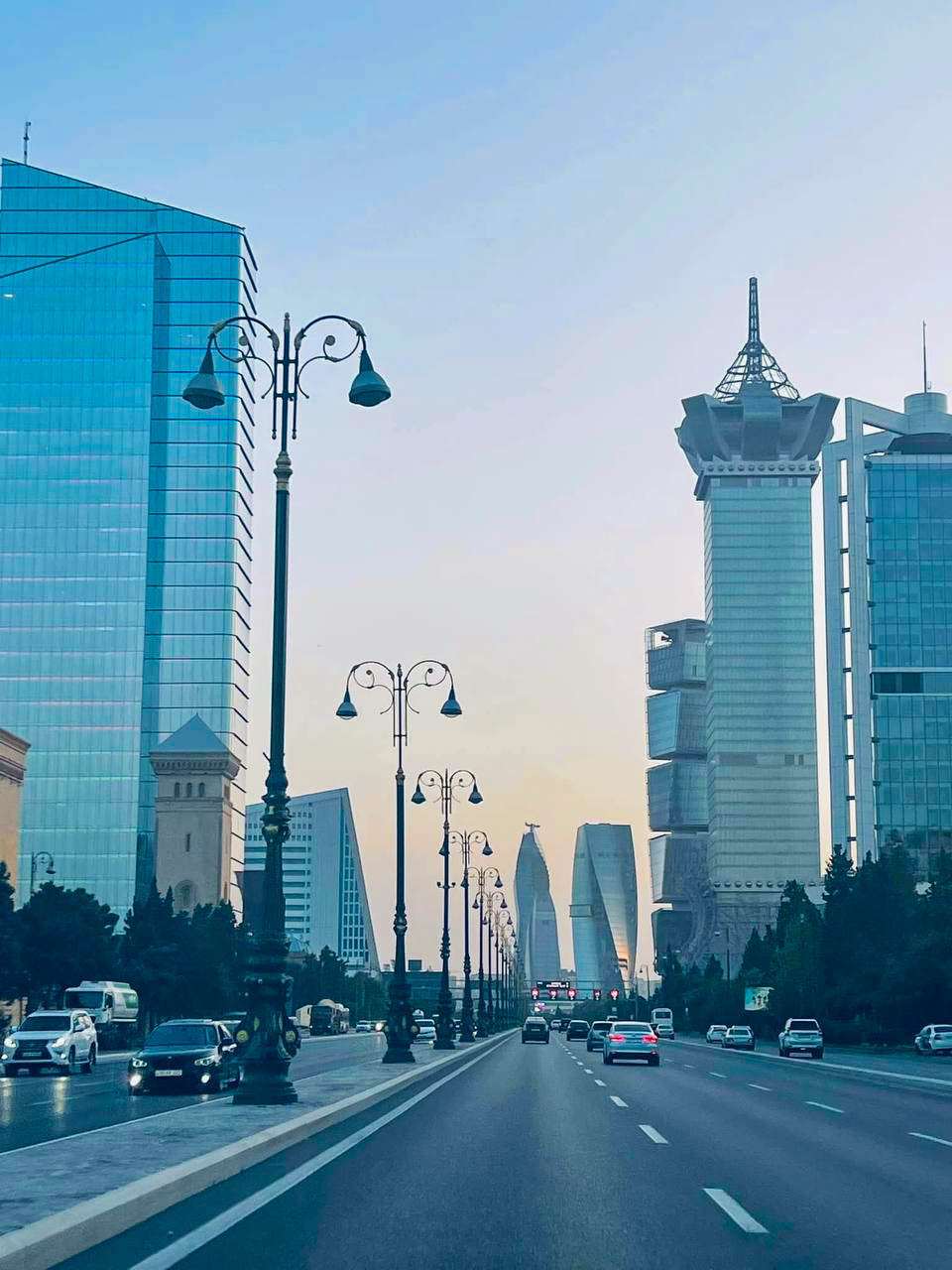
- Baku Tower at Heydar Aliyev Avenue

General information
- Status: Completed
- Location: Baku, Azerbaijan
- Coordinates: 40.4132°N 49.8980°E

Height
- Height: 276.3 m (906 ft)

Technical details
- Floor count: 49

Design and construction
- Architect: Eren Yorulmazer

Website
- www.smts.az/en/projects/baku-tower/

Baku Tower is a skyscraper in Baku, Azerbaijan. Standing at 276.3 m (906 ft) with 49 floors, it is currently the tallest building in Azerbaijan and the Caucasus region, but it will be dethroned by the upcoming 323 m (1,060 ft) tall Cipriani Tower upon its completion in 2031. Construction began in 2014 and was completed in 2020.

The tower is primarily used for office space and is located at 109 Heydar Aliyev Avenue. The building is constructed of reinforced concrete and steel, and the project was led by architect Eren Yorulmazer.
