= Musa (name) =

Name list for Musa

- Pronunciation: /ˈmuːsə/ Arabic: [muːsaː]
- Gender: Male

Origin
- Language: Hebrew
- Meaning: See "Moses" for hypotheses

Other names
- Alternative spelling: Mosa, Moosa, Mousa, Moussa
- See also: Moses in Islam

Musa is a masculine given name of Arabic origin. It is a cognate for "Moses". Notable people with the name include:

== Given name ==
- Musa of Karaman (1279–1356), Beg of Karamanid
- Musa of Parthia, Parthian monarch
- Musa II of Mali (died 1387), mansa of the Mali Empire
- Musa III of Mali, mansa of the Mali Empire
- Musa (magnate), Serbian nobleman
- Musa ibn Abi al-Abbas, Abbasid governor
- Musa Abdul-Aleem (born 1988), American basketball player
- Musa Mirmammad oglu Abdullayev (1927–1979), Azerbaijani medical doctor and academic
- Musa ibn Abi'l-Afiya, Miknasa Berber chieftain
- Musa Danladi Abubakar (born 1958), Nigerian lawyer and jurist
- Musa Adnin, Bruneian businessman and diplomat
- Musa Tsamiya Ado (born 1967), Nigerian politician
- Musa Adyshev (1915–1979), Kyrgyz geologist
- Musa Agah, Nigerian politician
- Musa Ahmad (1921–1993), Malaysian politician
- Musa Ibrahim Ahmadu (born 1953), Nigerian politician
- Musa Khan Ahmadzai (born 1956), Afghan politician
- Musa Ahmed (born 1997), Pakistani-Dutch cricketer
- Musa Halilu Ahmed (born 1976), Nigerian businessman and politician
- Musa Isiyaku Ahmed, Nigerian academic
- Musa Mohamed Ahmed, Sudanese politician
- Musa Akhmadov (1956–2026), Russian playwright, poet, novelist, writer, and magazine editor
- Musa Alami (1897–1984), Palestinian politician
- Musa Faidi al-Alami (died 1881), Palestinian politician
- Musa Habes Almaaytah (born 1954), Jordanian politician
- Musa Aman (born 1951), Malaysian politician
- Musa Nur Amin, Somali politician
- Musa Anter (1920–1992), Turkish writer, journalist, and intellectual
- Musa Araz (born 1994), Swiss footballer
- Musa Hakan Asyalı (born 1969), Turkish scientist
- Musa Audu (born 1980), Nigerian athlete
- Musa Avsever (born 1957), Turkish general
- Musa Aydın (born 1980), Turkish footballer
- Musa Babayo (born 1957), Nigerian banker, businessman, and politician
- Musa Bakare (born 1971), Nigerian swimmer
- Musa Baluku (born 1977), Ugandan militant
- Musa Bamaiyi (1948–2007), Nigerian Army major general
- Musa Mante Baraza (died 2020), Nigerian politician
- Musa Barrow (born 1998), Gambian footballer
- Musa ibn al-Ma'mun al-Bata'ihi (died 1192), Fatimid historian
- Musa Bazhaev (born 1966), Russian businessman
- Musa Bazi (1935–1998), Pakistani Islamic scholar
- Musa Beg, Safavid government official
- Musa Bello (1919–1975), Nigerian monarch
- Musa Bigiev (1873–1949), Russian Islamic scholar
- Musa Bilankulu (born 1985), South African footballer
- Musa Bility (born 1967), Liberian politician and businessman
- Musa ibn Bique, Omani politician
- Musa Bityonɡ (died 1986), Nigerian Army officer
- Musa Umar Bororo, Nigerian politician
- Musa Büyük (born 1980), Turkish footballer
- Musa Çağıran (born 1992), Turkish footballer
- Musa Cälil (1906–1944), Soviet poet and World War II resistance fighter
- Musa Ćazim Ćatić (1878–1915), Bosnian poet
- Musa Çelebi (died 1413), 15th-century Ottoman prince
- Musa Çelik (born 1983), German footballer
- Musa Cerantonio (born 1985), Australian convicted terrorist
- Musa Chaghatay uulu, Kyrgyz poet
- Musa Javed Chohan (born 1948), Pakistani diplomat
- Musa Daggash (1918–??), Nigerian civil servant
- Musa Demi (1878–1971), Albanian revolutionary and writer
- Musa Dibaga (born 2000), Gambian footballer
- Musa Didam (1933–2018), Nigerian traditional ruler
- Musa Drammeh (born 2001), Spanish footballer
- Musa Dube (born 1964), Motswana theologian
- Musa Ecweru (born 1964), Ugandan accountant and politician
- Musa Eroğlu (born 1946), Turkish musician
- Musa Nuri Esfandiari (1894–1972), Iranian diplomat
- Musa Evloev (born 1993), Russian Greco-Roman wrestler
- Musa Fagen-Gawo, Nigerian politician
- Musa Farisoğulları (born 1956), Turkish politician
- Musa Filibus (born 1960), Nigerian Lutheran bishop
- Musa Haji Ismail Galal (1917–1980), Somali writer, scholar, linguist, poet, historian, anthropologist, and meteorologist
- Musa Gareyev (1922–1987), Soviet war hero
- Musa Umar Garo, Nigerian politician
- Musa Gasimli (born 1957), Azerbaijani historian
- Musa Gibril Bala Gaye (1946–2026), Gambian politician, economist, banker, and diplomat
- Musa Geshaev (1940–2014), Russian poet, literary critic, songwriter, and historian
- Musa al-Gharbi, American sociologist
- Musa ibn Abi al-Ghassan (died 1491), Andalusian military leader
- Musa Hacigasimov (1886–1935), Azerbaijani architect and politician
- Musa Hadeib (died 1929), Palestinian politician
- Musa Hajdari (born 1987), Kosovan track athlete
- Musa Haroon (born 1986), Qatari footballer
- Musa Pasha ibn Hasan, Ottoman governor
- Musa ibn Isa ibn Musa al-Hashimi (746–??), Abbasid governor
- Musa Agha al-Hasi (died 1830), Ottoman commander
- Musa Hassan (born 1951), Malaysian police officer
- Musa Bin Jaafar Bin Hassan, Omani diplomat
- Musa Hawamdeh (born 1959), Palestinian-Jordanian poet
- Musa Hilal (born 1961), Sudanese tribal chief and militia leader
- Musa Hitam (born 1934), Malaysian politician
- Musa Hotak, Afghan military leader and politician
- Musa Hoti (1946–2004), Kosovan teacher and activist
- Musa al-Husayni (1853–1934), Palestinian politician
- Musa Ibragimov (born 1996), Russian footballer
- Musa Ibrahim (born 1979), Bangladeshi mountaineer, trekker, journalist, and author
- Musa Ibraimi (born 1978), Macedonian politician
- Musa Ilhan (born 1969), Australian wrestler
- Musa Inuwa (1948–2010), Nigerian politician
- Musa Isah (born 2000), Nigerian-Bahraini athlete
- Musa Jatta (born 2004), Gambian footballer
- Musa Juma (1968–2011), Kenyan singer, musician, and songwriter
- Musa Juwara (born 2001), Gambian footballer
- Musa ibn Bugha al-Kabir (died 877), Abbasid military leader
- Musa Kabiru (born 1986), Nigerian footballer
- Musa Kaleem (1921–1988), American jazz saxophonist and flautist
- Musa Kalimuddin (died 1710/11), Indian Da'i al-Mutlaq of the Dawoodi Bohra sect
- Musa Kallon (born 1970), Sierra Leonean football coach and player
- Musa Noah Kamara (born 2000), Sierra Leonean footballer
- Musa Kamuren, Kenyan Anglican bishop
- Musa Kanu (born 1976), Sierra Leonean footballer
- Musa Karli (born 1990), German footballer
- Musa Khan Kashi (1856–1939), Iranian musician
- Musa Kazanov (born 1936), Bulgarian wrestler
- Musa al-Kazim (745–799), Twelver Shia Imam
- Musa Keligov (born 1963), Russian politician
- Musa Keys (born 2000), South African singer and record producer
- Musa Khamis, Iranian general
- Musa Khan of Bengal (died 1623), Bengali zamindar
- Musa Baytash Khan, Khagan of Karakhanids
- Musa ibn Mus'ab al-Khath'ami (died 785), Abbasid provincial governor
- Musa Khawula (born 1991), South African social media personality and entertainment blogger
- Musa Al-Koni (born 1951), Libyan politician and diplomat
- Musa Konsulova (1921–2019), Ukrainian architect
- Musa Kraja (1938–2017), Albanian educator
- Musa ibn Ulayy ibn Rabah al-Lakhmi (707–779/80), Abbasid Islamic scholar and governor
- Musa Lawan (1943/44–2023), Nigerian politician
- Musa Luliga (born 1954), Tanzanian middle-distance runner
- Musa Mahomedov (born 1970), Ukrainian entrepreneur and politician
- Musa Adam Maihula, Nigerian Islamic scholar
- Musa Lawan Majakura, Nigerian fisherman, teacher, and politician
- Musa Makaniki, Nigerian religious leader
- Musa Mammadov (1932–2019), Azerbaijani politician
- Musa Mamut (1931–1978), Crimean Tatar activist
- Musa Manarov (born 1951), Azerbaijani cosmonaut
- Musa ibn Khalil Mazandarani, Iranian scribe and scholar
- Musa Mazayev (born 1977), Russian footballer
- Musa McKim (1908–1992), American artist and poet
- Musa Mirzayev (1933–2016), Azerbaijani composer
- Musa Mogushkov (born 1988), Russian judoka
- Musa Mohamad (1943–2024), Malaysian politician
- Musa Mohammed (footballer) (born 1991), Kenyan footballer
- Musa Mohammed (politician), Nigerian Army colonel
- Musa al-Mubarqa' (829–909), Arab descendant of the Islamic prophet Muhammad
- Musa Mudde (born 1990), Ugandan footballer
- Musa Dattijo Muhammad (born 1953), Nigerian jurist
- Musa Muhammed (born 1996), Nigerian footballer
- Musa ibn Muhanna (died 1341), Mamluk lord
- Musa Muradov (born 1958), Russian journalist
- Musa Murtazaliev (born 1988), Armenian wrestler
- Musa al-Musawi (1930–1997), Iranian-American Islamic scholar and philosopher
- Musa Mustapha (politician) (born 1975), Nigerian politician
- Musa ibn Faris al-Mutawakkil (died 1386), Marinid Sultan
- Musa Mwariama (1928–1993), Kenyan revolutionary leader
- Musa Naghiyev (1849–1919), Azerbaijani businessman
- Musa Najafi (born 1962), Iranian professor, historian, and author
- Musa Nastuyev (born 1976), Russian-Ukrainian judoka
- Musa Ncube, Zimbabwean politician
- Musa Ndusha (born 1994), Congolese footballer
- Musa Ngum (1953–2015), Gambian singer
- Musa Nizam (born 1990), Turkish footballer
- Musa Sani Nuhu (born 1969), Nigerian diplomat
- Musa ibn Nusayr (640–716), Umayyad general
- Musa Nyatama (born 1987), South African footballer
- Musa Amer Obaid (born 1985), Kenyan runner
- Musa Okwonga (born 1979), British author, podcaster, and musician
- Musa Kassim Omar, Somali surgeon and politician
- Musa Otieno (born 1973), Kenyan footballer
- Musa Muhammad Pali (born 1970), Nigerian politician
- Musa Piroğlu (born 1968), Turkish politician
- Musa al-Qarni (1954–2021), Saudi Islamic scholar, academic, and lawyer
- Musa Qarri (born 1943), Albanian painter
- Musa ibn Musa al-Qasawi (died 862), Andalusian monarch
- Musa Qazimi (1864–1915), Albanian politician and rebel
- Musa Qurbanlı (born 2002), Azerbaijani footballer
- Musa Qurbanov (born 1964), Azerbaijani footballer
- Musa Rajekshah (born 1974), Indonesian entrepreneur and politician
- Musa Ramadani (1944–2020), Kosovan novelist
- Musa Mohammed Sada (born 1957), Nigerian politician
- Musa al-Sadr (1928–??), Lebanese-Iranian Islamic cleric, politician, and revolutionary
- Musa Sarkin-Adar (born 1965), Nigerian politician
- Musa Sayrami (1836–1917), Chinese historian
- Musa Ghiatuddin Riayat Shah of Selangor (1893–1955), Malaysian sultan
- Musa al-Shabandar (1897–1967), Iraqi politician
- Mūsā ibn Shākir, Persian engineer and astronomer
- Musa Shanibov (1936–2020), Russian politician and revolutionary
- Musa Shannon (born 1975), Liberian-American footballer and administrator
- Musa Shehu, Nigerian politician
- Musa Sherif (born 1971), Indian motorsports professional
- Musa Shuaib (1943–1980), Lebanese poet and politician
- Musa Simelane (born 1974), Swazi boxer
- Musa Sirma, Kenyan politician
- Musa Smith (born 1982), American football player
- Musa Sor, Yazidi saint
- Musa Sukwene (born 1986), South African singer
- Musa Suliman (born 2004), Sudanese track and field athlete
- Musa Al-Taamari (born 1997), Jordanian footballer
- Musa Taimazov (1984–2026), Russian Paralympic athlete
- Musa ibn Ka'b al-Tamimi (died 759), Abbasid military commander
- Musa Tarabin (born 1997), Israeli footballer
- Musa Soltan Torkaman, Safavid governor
- Musa Toure (born 2005), Australian footballer
- Musa Trabulsi (1710–1790), Syrian secretary, grammarian, and translator
- Musa ibn Tubi, Sevillan poet
- Musa Mwin Tula, Nigerian Anglican bishop
- Musa Umarov (1953–2022), Russian politician
- Musa ibn ʿUqba (died 758/59), Arab historian, jurist, and traditionalist
- Musa Usman, Nigerian politician
- Musa Uzunlar (born 1959), Turkish actor
- Musa Wahab (1937–2014), Malaysian royal
- Musa Yabghu, Seljuk ruler
- Musa Yaffa (born 1994), Gambian footballer
- Musa Yahaya (born 1997), Nigerian footballer
- Musa ibn Yahya (died 835), Abbasid governor
- Musa Tukur Yakasai, Nigerian academic administrator
- Musa Yakub, Bruneian military officer
- Musa Sudi Yalahow, Somali politician and warlord
- Musa Yar'Adua (1912–1993), Nigerian politician and teacher
- Musa Dogon Yaro (1945–2008), Nigerian sprinter
- Musa Yerniyazov (1947–2020), Uzbek politician
- Musa Sinan Yılmazer (born 1987), Turkish footballer
- Musa Zondi (born 1960), South African politician
- Musa Al-Zubi (born 1993), Jordanian footballer
- Musa ibn Zurara, Abbasid governor

== Surname ==
- Ahmed Musa (born 1992), Nigerian footballer
- Antonius Musa, Roman botanist and physician
- Balkisu Musa (born 1970), Nigerian weightlifter
- Božo Musa (born 1988), Bosnian footballer
- Džanan Musa (born 1999), Bosnian basketball player
- Igor Musa (born 1973), Croatian footballer
- Isaac Musa (died 2008), Liberian military official and politician
- Mansa Musa (1280–1337), Mansa of the Mali empire
- Mario Musa (born 1990), Croatian footballer
- Mírzá Músá (died 1887), brother of Bahá'u'lláh, the founder of the Bahá'í Faith
- Murjanatu Musa (born 2000), Nigerian basketball player
- Petar Musa (born 1998), Croatian footballer
- Quintus Pomponius Musa, Roman magistrate, moneyer, and banker
- Said Musa (born 1944), Belizean politician
- Slaven Musa (born 1971), Bosnian footballer
- Sunusi Musa (born 1978), Nigerian politician
- Željko Musa (born 1986), Croatian handball player

== Derived name ==
Umm Musa is a female name of Semitic origin. Its meaning is mother of Musa.

- Umm Musa (Jochebed), mother of prophet Musa.
- Arwa bint Mansur al-Himyari (734–764) also known as Umm Musa, was the wife of Caliph al-Mansur.
- Umm Musa al-Hashimiyya, was a Qahramana courtier of the caliph's harem during the reign of Caliph al-Muqtadir (r. 908–929).

== See also ==
- Musa of Parthia, queen of Parthia c. 2 BC – AD 4
- Musa Kesedžija, a South Slavic legendary character
- Musa, a character from Winx Club
- Moussa (name)
- Musah (name)
