= Kashani =

Kashani or Qashani (Persian: کاشانی), often shortened to Kashi or al-Kashi (Persian: کاشی), is a surname meaning a person who comes from Kashan, Iran. It is also used as a feminine given name. Notable persons with that name include:

== People ==
=== Surname ===
- Abū Zayd ibn Muḥammad ibn Abī Zayd (died 1219), called Abu Zayd al-Kashani, Persian potter
- Abu al-Qasim Kashani (died after 1324), Persian historian, author of the History of Öljaitü
- Abd al-Razzaq Kāshānī, 14th-century Sufi mystic
- Mahmud ibn Ali al-Qashani (died 1335), Sufi scholar
- Masih Kashani (1577–1656), Iranian physician and poet
- Abbas Hosseini Kashani (1931–2010), Iranian Grand Ayatollah
- Musa Khan Kashi (1856–1939), Iranian Jewish musician
- Abol-Ghasem Kashani (1882–1962), Iranian Ayatollah and politician
- Afdal al-Din Kashani (died c. 1214), Persian poet and philosopher
- Ali Hojjat Kashani (1921–1979), Iranian military officer and politician
- Dariush Kashani, American-Iranian actor
- Eliezer Kashani (1923–1947), an Irgun member in Mandatory Palestine
- Firoozeh Kashani-Sabet, American-Iranian historian
- Habib Kashani, Iranian businessman and football administrator
- Jafar Kashani (1944–2019), Iranian footballer
- Jamshid al-Kashi (c. 1380–1429), Persian astronomer and mathematician
- Khalil Mobasher Kashani (born 1951), Iranian Grand Ayatollah
- Mahmoud Kashani (born 1942), Iranian politician and academic
- Mehran Kashani (born 1969), Iranian engineer and screenwriter
- Mohammed Emami-Kashani (born 1931), Iranian Ayatollah and politician
- Mohsen Fayz Kashani (1598–1680), Iranian poet, philosopher and muhaddith
- Mohtasham Kashani (1500–1588), Persian poet
- Sarmad Kashani (c. 1590–1661), Persian mystic, poet and saint in India of Jewish or Armenian origin
- Shahrum Kashani (1971–2021), Italian-Iranian pop singer

=== Given name ===
- Kashani Ríos (born 1991), Panamanian athlete
