= Mashadi Mirza Gafar Ismayilov =

- Born: Azerbaijani:Məşədi Mirzə Qafar İsmayılov; 1898; Baku, Azerbaijan
- Died: Baku, Azerbaijan
- Known for: Architect

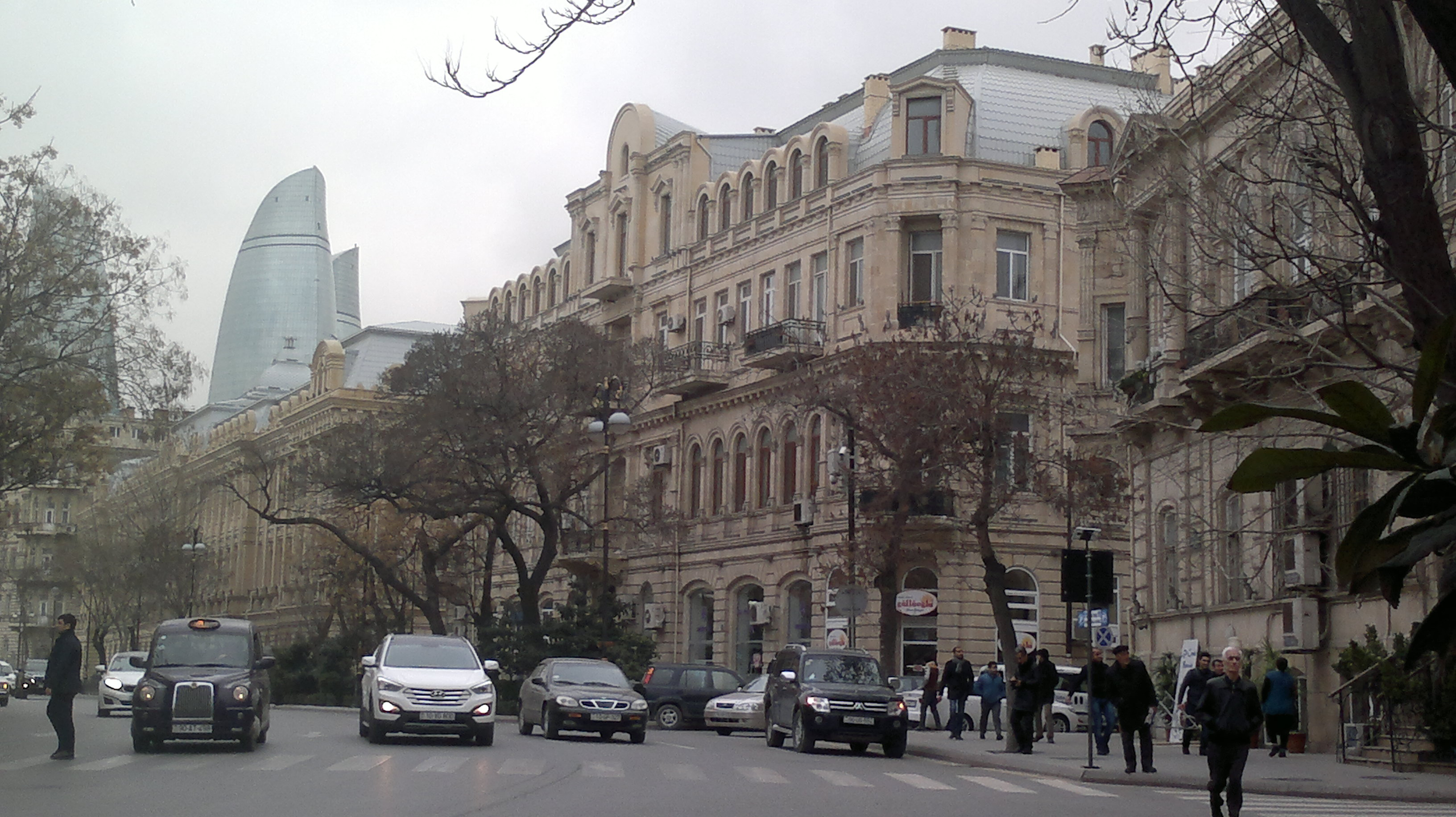
The building designed by Mirza Gafar Ismayilov and where Nariman Narimanov lived for a while.

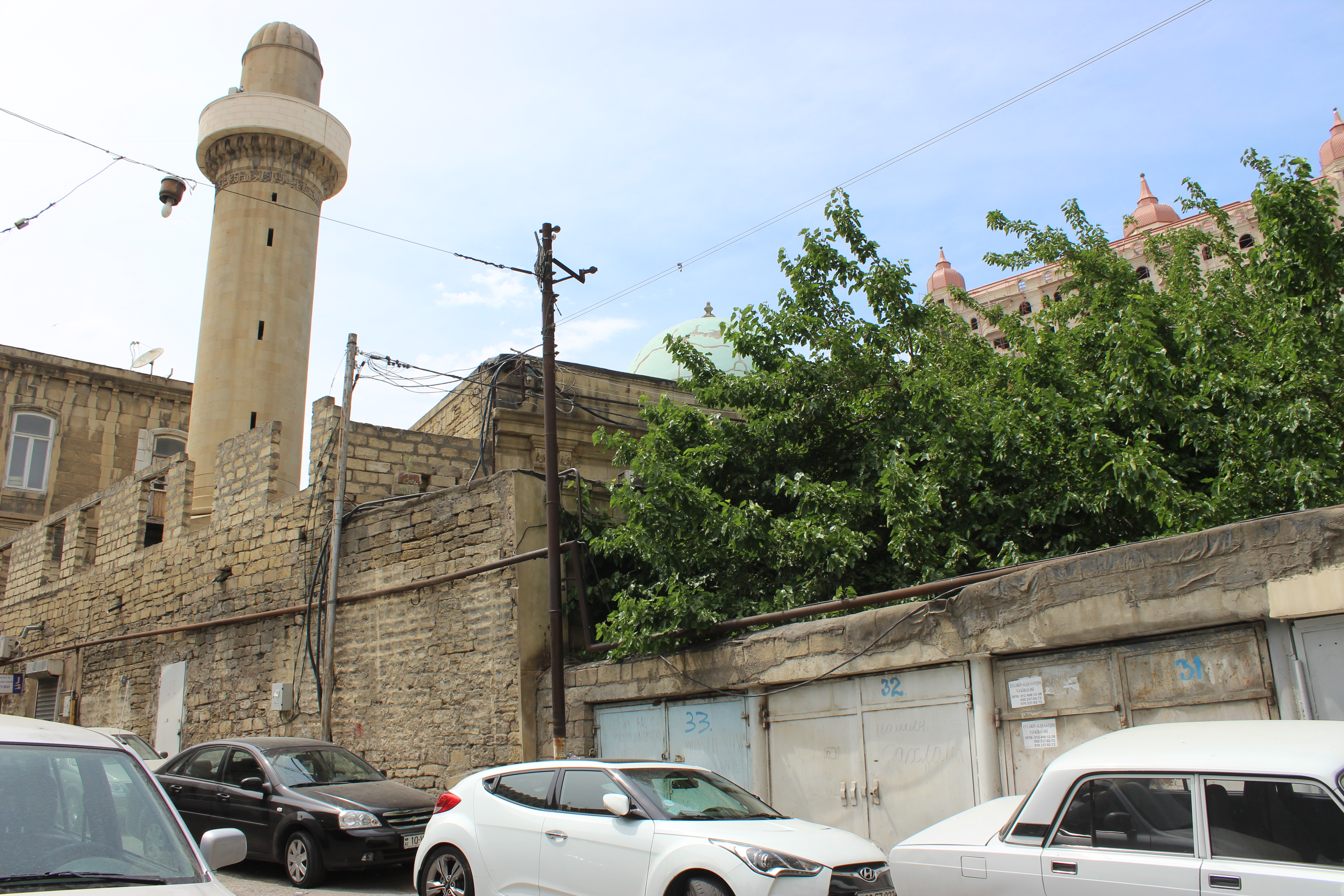
Gasimbey Mosque

Mashadi Mirza Gafar Ismayilov (Azerbaijani:Məşədi Mirzə Qafar İsmayılov) was a notable Azerbaijani architect of the late 19th century, credited with the construction of over a hundred single and two-story residential buildings, numerous shops, a mosque, and a bathhouse.

== Life ==
Ismayilov was a pupil of the renowned Azerbaijani architect Gasim bey Hajibababeyov. Ismayilov dedicated himself to architecture from 1868 to 1898. He is also noted for his proficiency as a skilled draftsman. Ismayilov became the architect for more than 25 houses within the Old City of Baku.

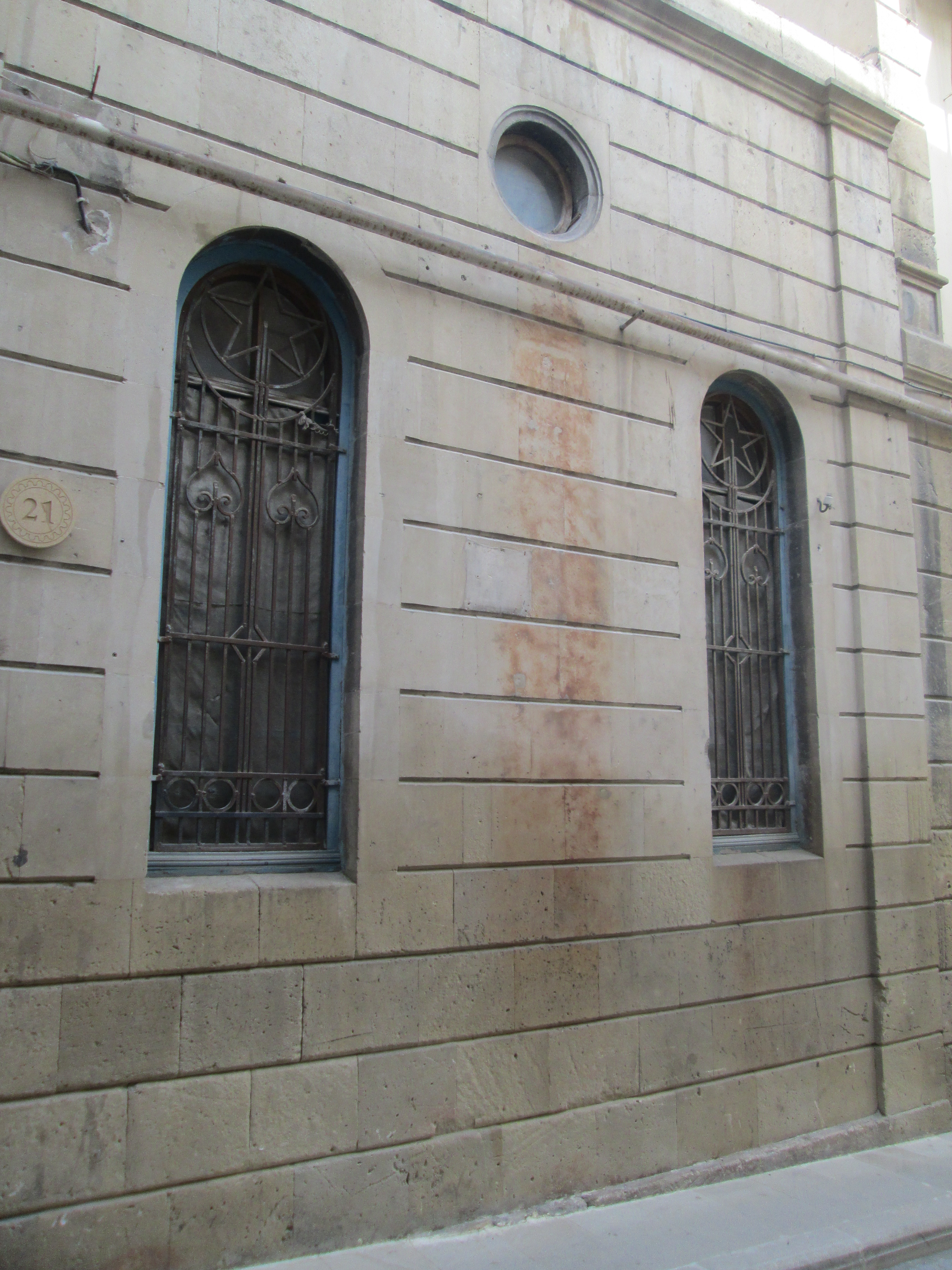
Khanlar Mosque

The mosque of Gasim bey, built in 1898 according to Ismayilov's design on Karantina Street (now Aziz Aslanov), externally resembles the Beyler Mosque in Old Cityr, although it has slight structural differences.

Khanlar mosque was constructed according to the plan of Mashadi Mirza Gafar Ismayilov.

Other architectural works:

- House in Tazapirskaya Street (1885),
- Two-storied house in Surakhanskaya Street (1886),
- Two-storied house in Kolyubakinskaya Street (1887),
- Two-storied house in Gubernskaya Street (1887),
- One-storied house in Persidskaya Street (1887),
- Two-storied house in Tazapirskaya Street (1898),
- Two-storied house in Nikolayevskaya Street (1890) etc.

== See also ==
- Hasan Majidov

== Sources ==
- Эфендизаде, Р. М. (1986). Архитектура Советского Азербайджана. Moskow.
- Фатуллаев, Ш. (1978). Градостроительство Баку XIX—начала XX веков. Leningrad.
- Fətullayev-Fiqarov, Ş. (2013). XIX-XX əsrin əvəllərində Azərbaycanda şəhərsalma və memarlıq. Baku.
