= Educational system =

Structure of all facilities and opportunities to acquire education within a country

The educational system generally is the structure of all institutions and the opportunities for obtaining education within a country. It includes all pre-school institutions, starting from family education, and/or early childhood education, through kindergarten, primary, secondary, and tertiary schools, then lyceums, colleges, and faculties also known as Higher education (University education). This framework also includes institutions of continuous (further) professional and personal education, as well as private educational institutions.

While the education system is usually regulated and organized according to the relevant laws of a country, a country's education system may have unregulated aspects or dimensions. Typically, an education system is designed to provide education for all sections of a country's society and its members. It comprises everything that goes into educating the population. Systems may be pluralistic or restrictive, such that all education needs to fit within one system. The Catholic Church issued a Declaration on Christian Education in 1965 which warned against any kind of "school monopoly", which it considered to be "opposed to the native rights of the human person, to the development and spread of culture, to the peaceful association of citizens to the pluralism that exists today in ever so many societies".

Educational systems may be structured in either centralized or decentralized formats. Comparative case studies indicate that centralized educational systems, such as that of South Korea, provide more favorable educational outcomes than decentralized systems, such as those in Brazil and South Africa.

The United Nations Educational, Scientific and Cultural Organization (UNESCO) recognises nine levels of education in its International Standard Classification of Education (ISCED) system, from Level 0 (pre-primary education) through Level 8 (doctoral). UNESCO's International Bureau of Education maintains a database of country-specific education systems and their stages.

== See also ==
- Business School
- System
- Education
- Educational equity
- Educational stage
- International Standard Classification of Education

== Bibliography ==
- Kallen, Denis (1996) Evaluating and reforming education systems. Paris, Organisation for Economic Co-operation and Development OCLC 34560025
- Helmut Fend: Die sozialen und individuellen Funktionen von Bildungssystemen: Enkulturation, Qualifikation, Allokation und Integration. In: Hellekamps, S./Plöger, W./Wittenbruch, W. (Hrsg.): Handbuch der Erziehungswissenschaft. Bd. 3: Schule. Paderborn u. a. 2011, S. 41–53.
- Průcha, Jan. (1999) Vzdělávání a školství ve světě. 1. vyd. Praha: Portál, 320 s. ISBN 80-7178-290-4. S. 16
- Peeter Mehisto, Fred Genesee (2015) Building Bilingual Education Systems, Cambridge University Press,
- Michael Belok, Krishna Gopal (1979) Educational Systems: Occidental and Oriental. Anu Prakashan
- García Garrido, José Luis. (ed.) Diagnosis of the Educational System. Madrid, Instituto Nacional de Calidad y Evaluación (España) 2000
- Sam Kaplan (2006), The Pedagogical State: Education and the Politics of National Culture in Post-1980 Turkey, Stanford University Press
- Clyde Chitty (1999) The education system transformed. Tisbury : Baseline Book OCLC 493660401
- EURYDICE:European Unit (1988) The Greek education system, Brussels, Published for the Commission of the European Communities, Directorate-General [for] Employment, Social Affairs and Education OCLC 19918107
- Musa Kraja (1998, 2006) Pedagogjia. Tiranë, OCLC 45276951
