= Eberechi Dick =

Nigerian monarch

Eze Udo I of Mgboko Ngwa Amaise Kingdom
- Reign: 1997
- Born: Eberechukwu N. Dick; Mgboko Ngwa, Obingwa, Abia State
- Issue: Prince Ugochukwu Bobby Dick
- Religion: Christianity
- Occupation: Businessman

Chairman Abia State Traditional Rulers Council
- In office 2013–2019
- President: Goodluck Jonathan
- Governor: Theodore Orji
- Succeeded by: HRM Eze Joseph Ndubuisi Nwabekee

Chancellor Federal University of Technology, Minna
- In office 2014–2020
- Succeeded by: Oba Aladetoyinbo Ogunlade Aladelusi

Chairman South East Council of Traditional Rulers
- In office 2018–2021
- Succeeded by: Obi Alfred Achebe

Chancellor Federal University of Agriculture, Zuru
- Incumbent
- Assumed office 2021

Eze Eberechi N. Dick // is a Nigerian monarch. He is the Eze Udo I of Mgboko Ngwa Amaise Kingdom in Obingwa Local Government Area of Abia State. He served as Chairman of Abia State Traditional Rulers Council from 2013 to 2019 and Chairman South-East Council of Traditional Rulers from 2015 to 2020. He served as the chancellor Federal University of Technology, Minna from 2018 to 2021 and currently the chancellor of Federal University of Agriculture, Zuru.
