= Ohanze =

Town in Obingwa, Nigeria

- Town
- Etymology: Igbo: Oha nze ("General Public")
- Location in Nigeria
- Coordinates: 5°7′0″N 7°28′0″E
- Country: Nigeria
- State: Abia State
- LGA: Obingwa

Government
  - Type: Monarchy
  - Council: The Palace Council

Ohanze// is a town in Obingwa local government area of Abia State. It served as a major commercial center during slave trade era in Nigeria.

== Notable people ==
- Nkechi Ikpeazu – First Lady of Abia State
- Acho Nwakanma – former Deputy Governor of Abia State
