= Musa Hawamdeh =

Palestinian poet

Musa Hawamda
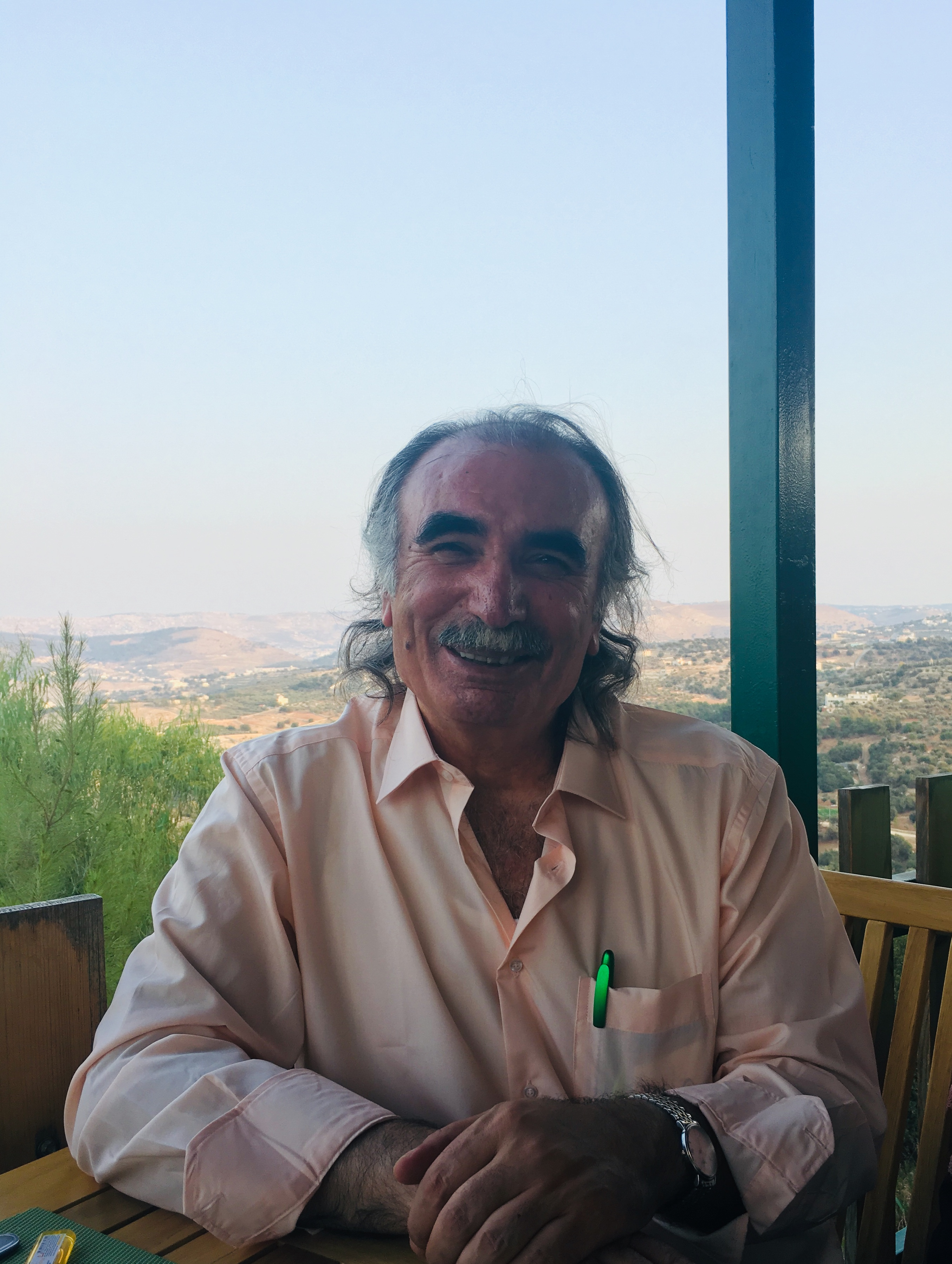
- Musa Hawamdeh on August 31, 2018.
- Born: 1959 (age 66–67); Hebron, Palestine
- Education: University of Jordan in 1982

Musa Hawamda (Arabic: موسى حوامدة; born 1959) is a prominent Palestinian-Jordanian poet, recognized in the anthology of Palestinian poetry and Arabic love poetry. He is a member of the Jordanian Writers Association and the Arab Writers Union, also holding a position in the administrative body of the Arab Internet Writers Union. Hawamdeh has participated in various Arab and European festivals, with his poems translated into multiple languages, including English, Persian, French, German, Swedish, Romanian, Kurdish, Bosnian, and Turkish.

Hawamdeh was born in Al-Sammu'i town in Hebron governorate. He studied high school in Hebron and was arrested more than once when he was a student there. He went to the University of Jordan and studied in the Arts College. He was arrested in the second year and imprisoned in solitary for three months and he got suspended of the university for one year then he came back to study and graduated from the Department of Arabic Language in 1982.

Filmmaker Nasser Omar directed a documentary highlighting Musa's poetic journey, broadcast as part of the program "These Others" on Orbit Channel and various satellite channels.

== Career ==
Hawamda began to publish his poems in the supplement of Al-Dustour Al-Thaqafi newspaper in the early 1980s when he was student and published his first poetry collection entitled Shaghab (1988 in Amman). He was banned from traveling and working until the beginning of the democracy era in Jordan. this when he joined Al-Sha`ab newspaper, then the Al-Dustour newspaper, then editing manager at Al-Arab Al-Youm newspaper. he is working currently as editing manager of the Cultural Department in the Jordanian constitution.

== Works ==
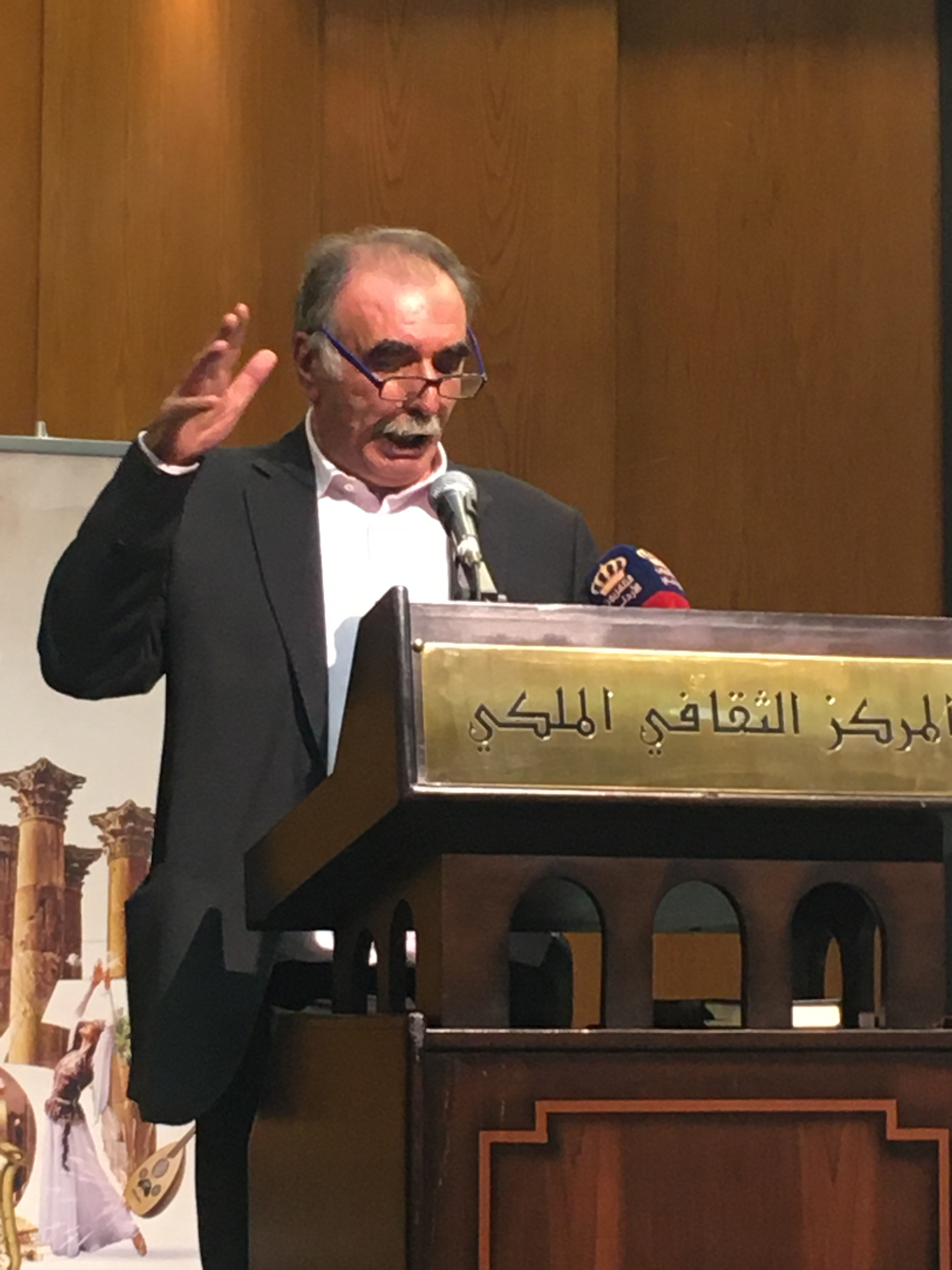
Hawamdeh recites poetry at the Royal Cultural Center, Amman.

- Shaghab was the first poetry collection published in 1988.
- In 1988, he published his second poetry collection Tazdadeen Samaa Wa Basaateen which are love poems.
- In 1999, he published his third poem collection Shajaray Aala (by the Arab Foundation for Studies and Publishing in Beirut), which led to the anger of the Islamic extremists who would justify killing him. The diwan was confiscated by the Ministry of Media of Jordan in March 2000 and submitted to the legal courts on May 5. At the same year he complied to the legal court and tried five times because the Court of Appeal refused to reject the case. After the legal courts finished of the case at the end of 2001, The Ministry of Media represented by Press and Publication of Department filed a new case against him. After several months in July 2002, The court announced his aquatically on the charge of insulting religions and violating the publications law, but the Attorney General appealed the verdict against him.

A decision was issued to imprison him for three months by the Amman Criminal Court for violating the Press and Publication Law, on his famous book Shajari Alaoui, which was confiscated in Jordan.

- The Arab Foundation for Studies and Publishing published his fourth poetry book (The Journeys of Moses in the Last Era) after the Publications Department removed many poems from it.
- In 2004, he published his fifth poetry collection from The Sea Side by the Arab Foundation for Studies and Publishing in Beirut.
- In 2007, his sixth poetry book was published by Dar Al-Shorouk, titled Sulalatay Alreeh Wa Unwanay Almatar. It is the poem for which it won two French prizes in 2006, namely the award of the French Cultural Foundation in Nancy and the Laplum Prize from the Terranova Poetry Festival.
- the Cultural Palaces Authority in Cairo issued for him, and as part of a series of Arab Creativity, an anthology of poetry entitled Sulalatay Alreeh Wa Unwanay Almatar, and Other Poems in 2010. Mawta Yajuroon Alsamaa by Arabesque House in Cairo in 2011, and the Egyptian General Book Authority reprinted the same collection in 2012.
- A second edition of Mawta Yajuroon Alsamaa on the Egyptian General Book Authority in Egypt 2012 as part of the Arab Creativity Series.
- A third edition of Sulalatay Alreeh Wa Unwanay Almatar within the Family Library Project / Ministry of Culture / Amman 2013.
- Body of the Sea, a robe for the poem, Dar Noon Emirates 2015.

He has three prose books in satirical literature like: Hikayat Al-Sumoo (2000 by Daar Alshouroo in Ram Allah and Amman). It was translated by Laila Al-Tai Melton for the English magazine Banipal in the latest issue devoted to modern Palestinian literature.

== Awards ==
Musa received several literary awards, including the Jordanian Writers Association award in 1982 for his poem "Al-Faraqat" (Gaps). In 2006, he was honored with the prestigious "La Plume" (The Pen) award from the French Oriani Foundation. He also received the Tyrnova French Festival award and the Australian Migrant Poetry award in 2011.

In addition to his awards, Musa actively participated in various Arab and European poetry festivals, contributing to anthologies such as Unwanan Li Buzoogh Alshams Wa Azifan, which was issued in Persian by the translation of the Iranian poet Musa Paidge.

== Influence ==
Musa Hawamdeh's literary impact is evident through translations, critical analyses, and recognition in both Arabic and international literary circles. Several renowned figures, including the late poet Baland Al-Haidari, Salah Fadl, Ali Bader, Jafar Hassan, Naim Araidi, Wijdan Al-Sayegh, Jalal Barjas and others have engaged with and written about Musa's poetry. Notably, a book titled "Shi'riyat Al-Tamarrud: Muqarabat Naqdiyah fi Dawawin Al-Sha'er Musa Hawamdeh" edited by Ahmed Al-Lawndi and published by Egyptian Metabook in 2023 analyzes and critiques Musa's poetic collections. Additionally, there have been master's theses and critical books, such as "Hudur Al-Mawt wa Iqa' Al-Ghaib fi Shi'r Musa Hawamdeh" by Ahmed Shahab. A master's thesis on his poetry presented by the Iraqi student, Abdul-Khaleq Farhan Ali Al-Khatouni, entitled Technical Structures in Musa Hawamdeh's Poetry at the University of Mosul 2013 AD.

Director Nasser Omar directed a movie about has poetic experience in Hauolaa Alakharoon, which was broadcast on Orbit and other TV channels.
