= Federal University of Agriculture, Zuru =

Public university in Zuru, Nigeria

- Other names: FUAZ
- Former names: College of Agriculture, Zuru
- Type: Public
- Established: 2020; 6 years ago
- Founders: Federal Government of Nigeria
- Accreditation: National Universities Commission (NUC)
- Visitor: President, Federal Republic of Nigeria
- Chancellor: Eze Eberechi N. Dick (JP)
- Vice-Chancellor: Prof. Ibrahim Rakson Muhammad (2025–present)
- Registrar: Abdulaziz Yusuf Bazata
- Location: Zuru, Kebbi State, Nigeria; 11.40674°N 5.24066°E
- Campus: Rural
- Website: www.fuaz.edu.ng

Federal University of Agriculture, Zuru is a public university located in Zuru, Kebbi State, Nigeria, and operated by the Federal Government of Nigeria.

== History ==
Originally established as the College of Agriculture, Zuru, the institution was affiliated with Ahmadu Bello University, Zaria. The college came under the supervision of the National Board for Technical Education in 1977. Following a bill introduced by Senator Bala Ibn Na'allah, the Nigerian Senate approved its upgrade to a university in April 2019, and it began full operations in September 2020.

In 2020, President Muhammadu Buhari appointed Prof. Musa Isiyaku Ahmed as the pioneer vice-chancellor. In February 2025, the Governing Council appointed Prof. Ibrahim Rakson Muhammad as the second substantive Vice-Chancellor, and he officially assumed office in March 2025.

== Academic Structure ==
FUAZ currently operates the following academic colleges:

- College of Agriculture
- College of Science
- College of Veterinary Medicine

These colleges offer a range of undergraduate programmes and are foundational to the university's agricultural and scientific focus.

== Library ==
The University Library supports teaching, learning, and research. Its E-Library platform provides access to global databases such as JSTOR and ScienceDirect, with digital automation enabling efficient information retrieval.

== Research and Institutional Development ==
In March 2025, following his appointment, Prof. Ibrahim Rakson Muhammad established the Coordinating Office for Research, Excellence, Development, and Institutional Transformation (CREDIT). The CREDIT office is a strategic initiative designed to strengthen research leadership, innovation management, grant acquisition, and institutional transformation at FUAZ.

== Strategic Vision ==
The university envisions becoming a hub for excellence in agriculture, technology, and rural transformation. Strategic priorities include:

- Strengthening academic governance and research leadership
- Enhancing staff capacity through development programmes
- Improving operational systems via digital transformation
- Pursuing funding diversification and internationalization opportunities

== Vice-Chancellors ==
- Musa Isiyaku Ahmed (2020–2025)
- Ibrahim Rakson Muhammad (2025–present)

== Chancellors ==
- Eze Eberechi N. Dick (JP) (2021–present)
