= Nkechi Ikpeazu =

Nigerian politician

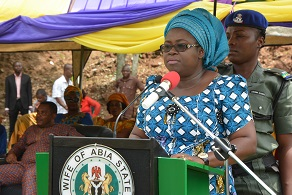
- Born: Ile-Ife, Nigeria
- Education: Enugu State University of Science and Technology
- Occupation: Politician
- Title: Founder and President of Vicar Hope Foundation
- Spouse: Okezie Ikpeazu

Nkechi Caroline Ikpeazu (née Nwakanma) was the First Lady of Abia State from 29 May 2015 to 29 May 2023, as wife of the former Governor of Abia State located in the southeast of Nigeria. She is also the Founder and President of Vicar Hope Foundation, a non-profit organisation that has Special Consultative Status with the United Nations Economic and Social Council(ECOSOC)

== Early life and education ==
Nkechi Ikpeazu was born in Ile-Ife. She hails from Ohanze Isiaha in Obingwa LGA of Abia State. She attended Community Primary School Ohanze; Girls High School, Aba; Teacher Training College Ihie; Alvan Ikoku College of Education Owerri; Enugu State University of Science and Technology Enugu; University of Nigeria Nsukka; the National Open University of Nigeria; and the Abia State University, Uturu. She possess an NCE in Business Studies, a bachelor's degree in Cooperatives and Rural Development, a post graduate Diploma in Management and a master's degree in management. She has completed a doctorate at the Abia State University, Uturu.

== Career ==
Nkechi has worked as a teacher, an accounts executive with Camway Ventures Lagos, a banker with Lobi Bank from 1986 to 1996, and as Registrar of Cooperatives with Abia State Government.

Nkechi is a sports promoter and the major backer of the women football premier league club side, Abia Angels FC.

== Charitable work ==
Through her NGO, the Vicar Hope Foundation, VHF, she has built several homes for indigent persons. The Vicar Hope Foundation VHF is also involved in providing better healthcare for mother and child, and in battling cancer, diabetes, and sickle cell diseases. VHF has completed two sickle cell hospital/cancer diagnosis and treatment centres in Umuahia and Aba and offers subsidized treatment to patients. The Foundation also runs a GBV Response Desk that offers interventions and referral for prevention and protection.

== Personal life ==
Nkechi is married to the former Governor of Abia State, Dr. Okezie Ikpeazu, who hails from Umuobiakwa, Obingwa LGA. Together they have two boys and two girls. Ikpeazu is a Deaconess of the Seventh Day Adventist Church and professes a close relationship with God.

== See also ==
- List of first ladies of Nigerian states
