= Mgboko Ngwa =

City in Obingwa

Mgboko Ngwa Mgboko Ngwa Amaise
- Town
- Nickname: Mgboko
- Motto(s): Peace and Unity
- Mgboko Ngwa, Obingwa, Abia State, Nigeria.
- Coordinates: 5.15°N 7.45°E
- Country: Nigeria
- State: Abia State
- Local Government: Obingwa

Government
  - King: Eze Eberechi Dick

Mgboko Ngwa is a town in Obingwa local government area of Abia State, Nigeria.
