= Khanlar Mosque =

Former mosque in Baku, Azerbaijan

- Azerbaijani: Xanlar Məscidi
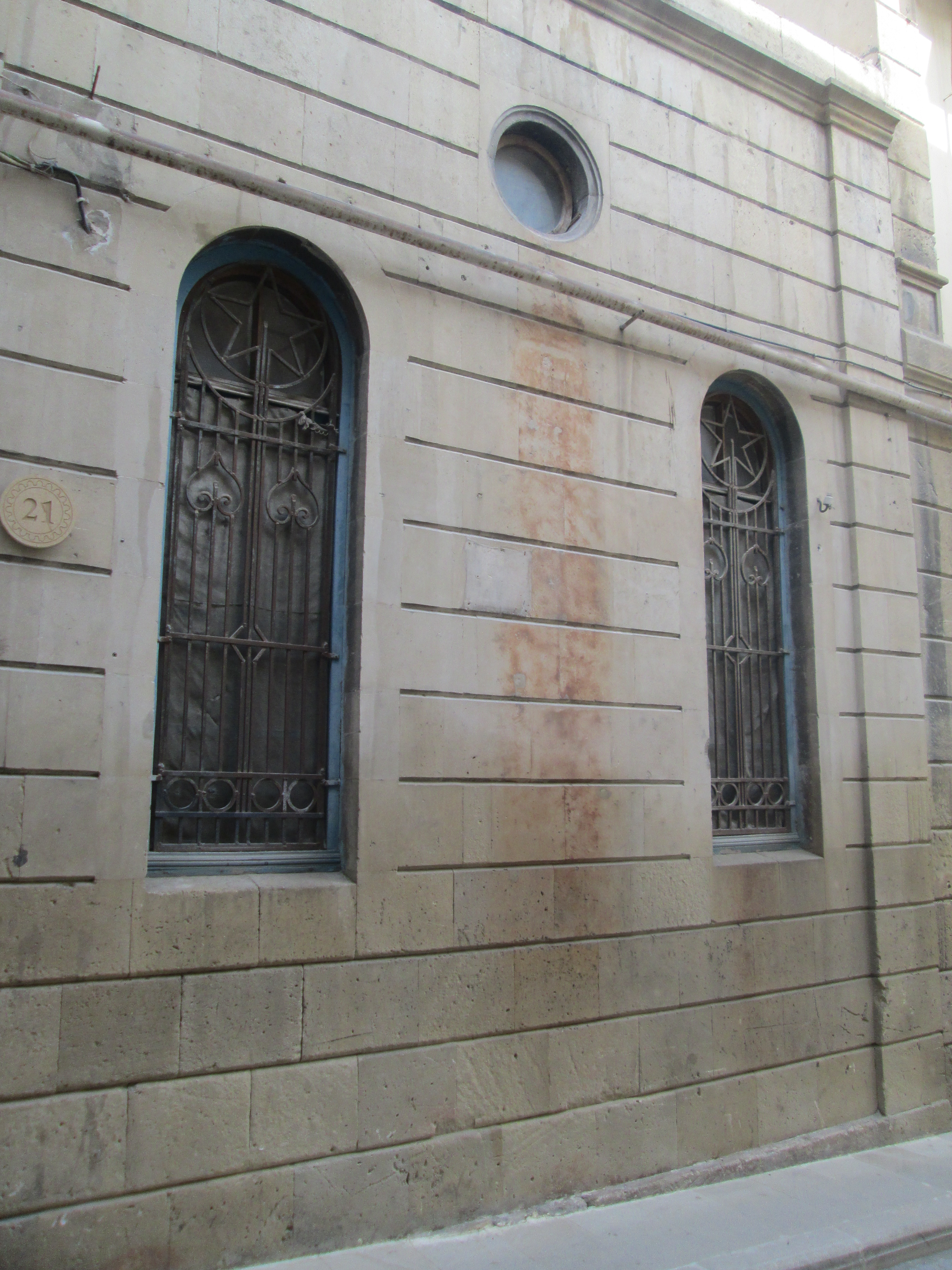
- Exterior of the former mosque, in 2014

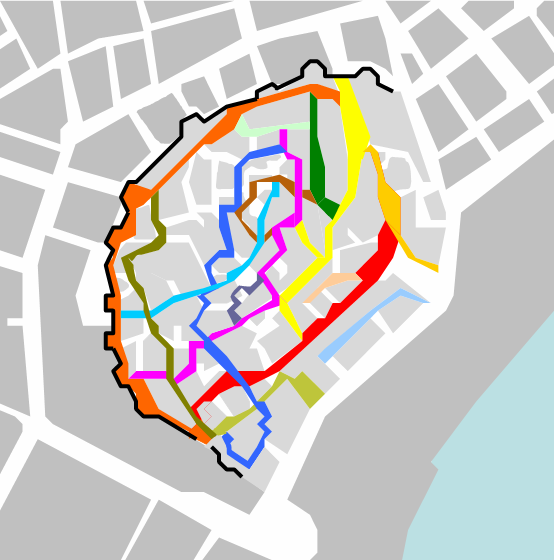
- Location of the former mosque in the Baku Old City

Religion
- Affiliation: Islam (former)
- Ecclesiastical or organisational status: Mosque (19th century–1928); Profane use (1928–1992); Residence (since 1992)
- Status: Abandoned (as a mosque); Repurposed (as a residence)

Location
- Location: Firdousy Street, Old City, Baku
- Country: Azerbaijan
- Coordinates: 40°22′5.23″N 49°50′8.12″E

Architecture
- Type: Mosque architecture
- Dome: Several

The Khanlar Mosque (Azerbaijani: Xanlar məscidi) is a former mosque and historical architectural monument, located on Firdousy Street, in the Old City of Baku, Azerbaijan.

Completed at the end of the 19th century, the former mosque was designated as a nationally significant immovable historical and cultural monument by the decision No. 132 of the Cabinet of Ministers of the Republic of Azerbaijan on August 2, 2001.

After the Soviet occupation, the mosque ceased its religious activities and is currently used as a residential building.

== About ==
The mosque was constructed at the end of the 19th century upon the commission of the Khanlarov brothers, located near their houses in Old City, Baku. It was constructed according to the plan of Mashadi Mirza Gafar Ismayilov.

After the Soviet occupation in Azerbaijan, official measures to combat religion began in 1928. In December of the same year, the Azerbaijan Communist Party Central Committee transferred many mosques, churches, and synagogues to the balance of educational clubs for use in enlightening directions. If there were 3,000 mosques in Azerbaijan in 1917, by 1927, this number had reduced to 1,700, and by 1933, it was down to 17.

After the restoration of Azerbaijan's independence, the mosque was included in the list of nationally significant immovable historical and cultural monuments by the decision No. 132 of the Cabinet of Ministers of the Republic of Azerbaijan on August 2, 2001.

The former mosque has been used as a residential building since 1992.

== Architecture ==
The former mosque is situated in an elongated rectangular shape within residential neighborhoods. It is divided into three sections at the entrance. The central section is completed with a dome, while the sides are covered with domes as well. Along the length of the prayer hall, protective windows with ornate motifs and a richly decorated mihrab are present. The interior is adorned with abundant floral motifs.

== See also ==
- Islam in Azerbaijan
- List of mosques in Azerbaijan
- List of mosques in Baku
