= Hasan Majidov =

Azerbaijani politician (1914–1978)

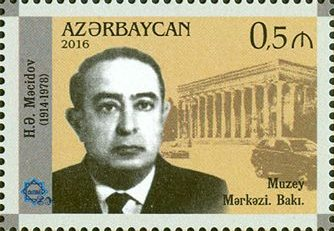
- Postage stamps were issued dedicated to the 80th anniversary of the Union of Architects of Azerbaijan
- Born: 12 December 1914; Baku, Russian Empire
- Died: 11 January 1978 (aged 63); Baku, Azerbaijan SSR
- Citizenship: Russian Empire; Azerbaijan Democratic Republic; Soviet Union
- Occupation: Architect

Hasan Majidov (Azerbaijani:Həsən Əli oğlu Məcidov; b. 12 December 1914, Baku, Russian Empire - d. 11 January 1978, Baku, Azerbaijan SSR) was an Azerbaijani architect, chairman of the Azerbaijan SSR State Construction and Architectural Affairs Committee (1959-1960), honored builder of the Azerbaijan SSR (1960).

== Life ==
Hassan Majidov was born in 1914 in Baku. He began his education at the Azerbaijan Industrial Institute and graduated from the Faculty of Architecture and Construction in 1937. Afterward, he started working as an architect at the State Design Institute.

During the Second World War, he fought in the ranks of the Red Army and was discharged in 1946 due to injuries. From February 1948, he worked as the head of the 2nd architectural workshop at the "Azdövlətləyihə" Institute. Since 1954, Hassan Majidov became an associate professor of architectural structures at the Azerbaijan Polytechnic Institute.

Hassan Majidov became a member of the Azerbaijan Architects Union Executive Committee and was nominated as a candidate for membership in the Azerbaijan Communist Party Baku Committee at the XXX and XXXI Baku City Party Conferences.

Based on Hassan Majidov's project, the Museum Center was built in 1960 in commemoration of the 90th anniversary of V.I. Lenin's birth, and in 1961, it was opened as a branch of the V.I. Lenin Museum in Moscow. Hassan Majidov was the author of several other projects in Azerbaijan, such as the Baku Airport building, "Baku" Hotel, the building of the State Musical Drama Theater in Nakhchivan (1964), Dzerzhinsky Cultural Palace (1948, now Cultural Center of the State Security Service), the Baku metro station “Mashadi Azizbekov” (1972; in 2011 renamed “Koroglu”), residential buildings, a cinema, a club and other buildings.

He was a deputy of the Supreme Council of the Azerbaijan SSR of the 5th convocation (1959-1962). In 1960 he was awarded the title of Honored Builder of the Azerbaijan SSR.)

Died on January 11, 1978, in Baku.

== Awards ==
- Medal "For Courage" (1943)
- Medal "For the Defence of the Caucasus"
- Medal "For the Victory over Germany in the Great Patriotic War 1941–1945"
- Order of the Badge of Honour
- Honored builder of the Azerbaijan SSR (1960)

== Memory ==
On December 15, 2014, in connection with the 100th anniversary of Hasan Majidov, a memorial plaque with the name of the architect was unveiled on the wall of the Museum Center in Baku, the author of which he was the author of the project.

In May 2016, postage stamps were issued dedicated to the 80th anniversary of the Union of Architects of Azerbaijan. One of the stamps depicts Hasan Majidov and the building of the Baku Museum Center.

== See also ==
- Architecture of Baku
- Musa Hacigasimov
