= Museum Center (Baku) =

Coordinates: 40.3697°N 49.8426°E

The Museum Center
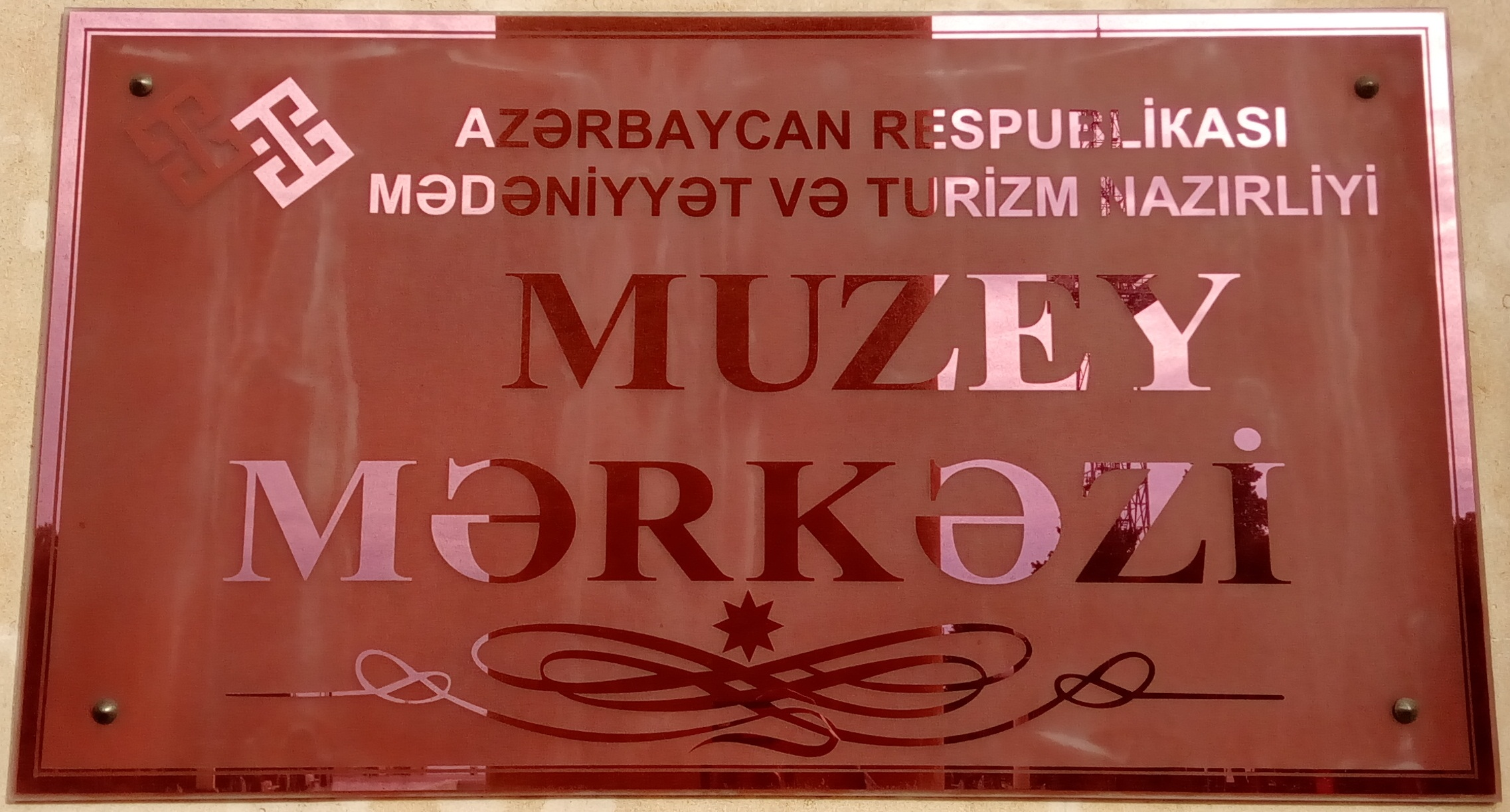
- Established: 1991
- Location: Neftchilar ave 123a, Baku, Azerbaijan
- Type: Museum center
- Director: Liana Vezirova
- Architect: Hasan Majidov
- Owner: Ministry of Culture and Tourism of the Republic of Azerbaijan
- Website: Museumcenter.az

The Museum Center of the Ministry of Culture and Tourism of the Republic of Azerbaijan is a building located in Baku, Azerbaijan near Boulevard. The classical and conceptual art exhibitions of modern Azerbaijan, anniversary and personal exhibitions of famous artists, debut creativity of new artists are demonstrated here.

The Museum Center of the Ministry of Culture and Tourism of the Republic of Azerbaijan includes:

- Azerbaijan State Museum of Musical Culture
- Azerbaijan State Theatre Museum
- Independence Museum of Azerbaijan
- Azerbaijan State Museum of History of Religion
- An art gallery
- A circular ceremonial hall
- An assembly hall

== History ==
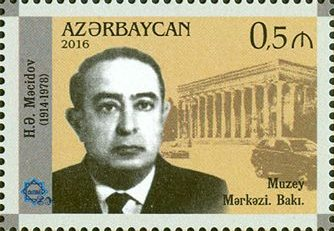

The Baku branch of the V.I.Lenin Center Museum was founded on the basis of the Museum of History of Azerbaijan Bolshevik Organizations named after I.V.Stalin on August 4, 1954, based on the decision of the Soviet Communist Party and opened in April 1955 to the public. With four memorials, historical-revolutionary museums (Museum of Nina's Secret House, Meshadi Azizbekov's House-Museum, Sergey Kirov's House Museum, Union of Oil Industry Workers and museum of “Gudok Newspaper”), it was one of the ideological business centers of promoting Leninism in the republic and educating laborers on the example of Lenin's life and activity. More than 9,000 different exhibits, including Lenin's manuscripts, were presented at the exposition. The new building for the museum was built on the site of the former Petrov Park in 1957 by Azerbaijani architect Hasan Majidov for the 90th anniversary of V.I Lenin and commissioned in 1961 as a branch of the Moscow Museum named after V.I Lenin. In 1991, after the collapse of the USSR, the building was transferred to the Ministry of Culture of the Republic of Azerbaijan and renamed to the Museum Center. Director of the Museum Center is Liana Vezirova.

== Structure ==
The building of the Museum Center consists of four floors. On the ground floor there is a foyer and a museum kiosk. The assembly hall and the State Museum of Musical Culture of Azerbaijan are on the second floor. On the third, there are the Museum of Independence of Azerbaijan and the Azerbaijan State Theater Museum named after Jafar Jabbarly. The Directorate, the Round Hall, the Art Gallery, the Information Center, and the Russian Museum Information Survey Center are located on the fourth floor.

== Art Gallery ==
The Art Gallery consists of five halls, the total area of which is 400 m^{2}. Since its inception, the gallery has been used as an exhibition space. In 1961, the gallery hosted the first exhibition, which was dedicated to Yuri Gagarin, the first man to go into space. In the late 1980s, the Komsomol Museum of the Komsomol Central Committee was opened in the gallery. In 1991, the gallery reverted to its original appearance.

Since 2006, the gallery has held such exhibitions such as “The Wings of Time, The Seasons”, “Autumn Colors”, “Spring. Woman. Love”, “Impression of Summer”, “Harmony of Winter”, and “Rainbow of Love”. The Gallery also hosted the exhibition of five destinations by German photographer Klaus Wikrat, the solo exhibition by Bulgarian artist Emil Stoychev, the photo illumination “Illumination” by the representative of the school of contemporary American photography Tuba Oztekin Coymen.

== Round Hall ==
The area of the Round Hall is 230 m^{2} and located under the glass cupola of the building. Presentations, official receptions, ceremonial opening, collegiums of the Ministry of Culture and Tourism, signing of agreements on cultural cooperation, and fashion shows of Azerbaijani designers are usually held in the round hall.

== Cooperation ==
The Museum Center of the Ministry of Culture and Tourism of the Republic of Azerbaijan closely cooperates with the museums of Russia, Georgia, USA, France, and Germany.

Various kinds of events, conferences of international organizations of UNESCO, UN, TURKSOU, seminars, memorial evenings to famous people, press conferences, etc. are held in the museum center. The Department of Cultural Development and International Relations was opened in the Museum Center in 2005 and the purpose of creating this department was the development of new cultural programs.

A delegation of Norwegian Museum of Archaeological Museum in Stavanger visited Azerbaijan on September 23, 2007. The sides signed the agreement on "Cooperation between the museums of Azerbaijan and Norway". The project was based on the "Caravan - Fireside Land of Azerbaijan" exhibition by Azerbaijani and Norwegian sides and was based on mutual interest in further development and strengthening of ties and cooperation between museums of Azerbaijan and Norway and facilitating future cultural relations and cooperation between the two countries.

== See also ==
List of museums in Azerbaijan
