= Abayi Okoroato =

Abayi Okoroato Abayi Umu-Okoroato
- Village
- Abayi Umu-okoroato
- Nickname: Abayi
- Motto: Peace and Unity
- Abayi Okoroato, Obingwa, Abia State, Nigeria.
- Coordinates: 5°50′56″N 7°58′04″E
- Country: Nigeria
- State: Abia State
- Local Government: Obingwa

Government
  - Chairman: Elder Isaac Eze Samuel.
  - King: Eze Nwaiaraije Eneogwe

Abayi Umu-okoroato is a Village in Obingwa local government area of Abia State, Nigeria.

== History ==
Abayi Okoroato is domiciled in Obingwa, Abia State, South-east geopolitical zone of Nigeria.

The village is made up of eight Kindreds:

- Umu-Alioha
- Umu-Onyeike
- Umu-Uje
- Umu-Imegwu
- Umu-Atali
- Umu-Naocha
- Umu- Diji
- Umu-Nwagbaghioso

The current estimated population of Abayi Okoroato is put at 56,426 inhabitants. The area populace made up of people from the Ngwa sub-division of the Igbo ethnic group.

The Ngwa dialect of the Igbo Language is commonly spoken in the area while the religion of Christianity is widely practiced in the area. Popular festivals held in Obingwa LGA include the New Yam festival.

== Economy ==
Trade is an important aspect of the economy of Abayi Okoroato with the area hosting markets such as Ahia Eke market where a plethora of commodities are bought and sold. Farming is also a key feature of the economic activities undertaken by the people of Abayi Okoroato with crops such as yam, cassava, cocoyam, and vegetables grown in large quantities within the area.

Palm oil production is one of the key source of income for the people of Abayi Okoroato. Except for personal palm plantations, all palm trees belong to the village, and is sold out to outsiders or the villagers to generate revenue for the Village.

== Dominant churches ==
The dominant churches in Abayi Okoroato are mostly the orthodox churches, including, Seventh-Day Adventist church (S.D.A). United Evangelical Church (U.E.C). Church of Christ (C.o.C). Apostolic Christian Church (A.C.C)
