= Mgboko =

- Town
- Interactive map of Mgboko
- Location in Nigeria
- Coordinates: 5°9′15.26″N 7°27′25.44″E
- Country: Nigeria
- State: Abia State
- Local Government Area: Obingwa

Government
  - Type: Local government
- Time zone: UTC+1 (WAT)
- Climate: Aw

Mgboko is a town located in and serving as the administrative headquarters of the Obingwa local government area of Abia State, Nigeria.

In 2024, construction of the 19.1-kilometre Itungwa-Mgboko-Amaise-Amairi- Omoba-Abiaba-Nkwo-Elechi Road started.
