= Vicar Hope Foundation =

Private foundation founded by Nkechi Ikpeazu

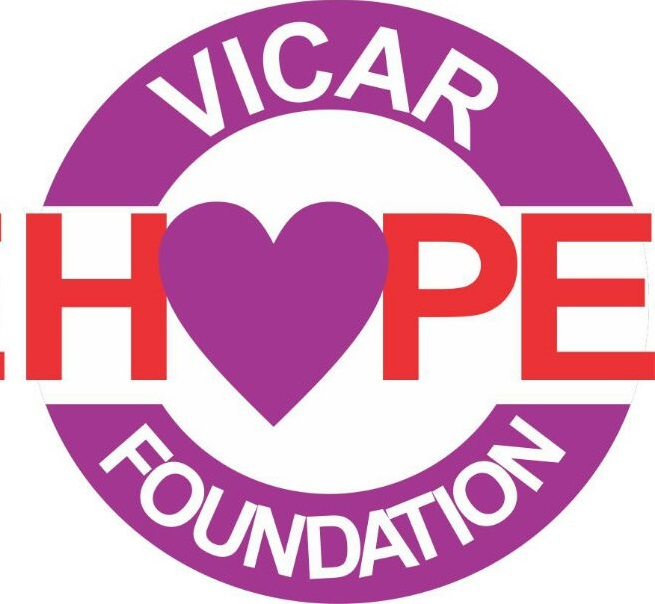

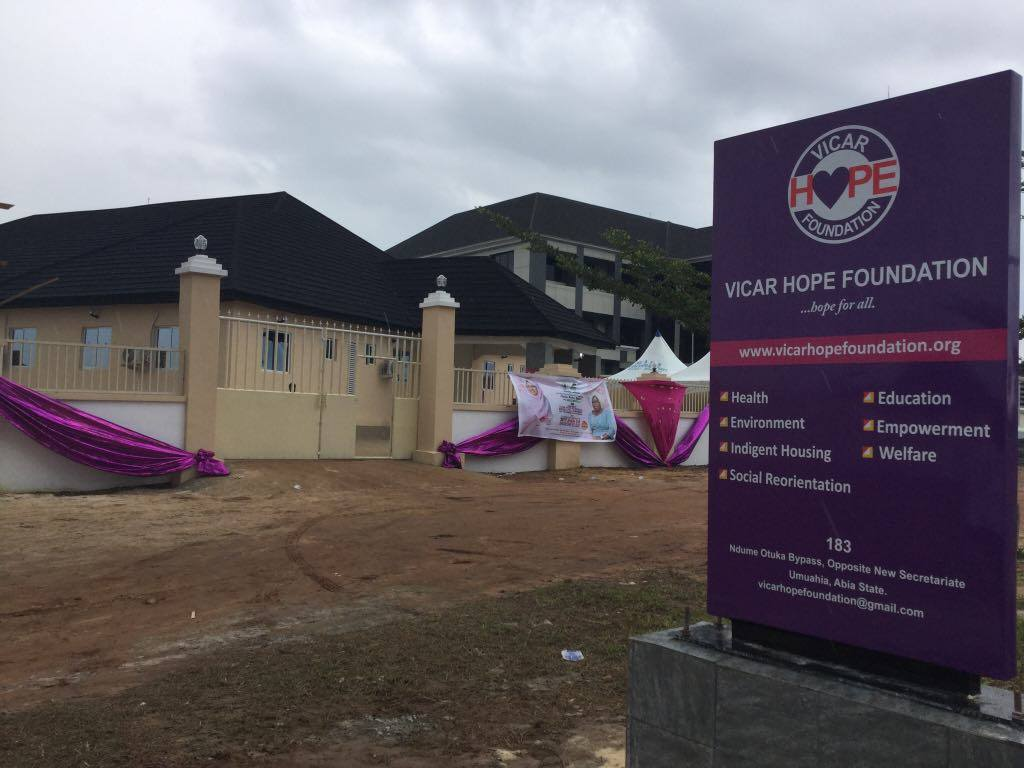
- Vicar Hope Foundation headquarters in 2019
- Abbreviation: VHF
- Formation: November 2015; 10 years ago
- Founders: Nkechi Ikpeazu
- Type: Non-governmental Organization
- Legal status: Non-profit
- Headquarters: 183 Ndume Otuka Bypass, Umuahia, Abia State, Nigeria.
- Coordinates: 5°31′14″N 7°30′42″E
- Region served: Abia State, Nigeria.
- Method: Donations, grants
- Key people: Nkechi Ikpeazu (President); Edith Nwosu (Vice President); Anthony Enwereji(Trustee, Secretary); Kate Ndukauba(Trustee); Raymond Aliga(Trustee); Chika Ojiegbe(Trustee & Assistant General Secretary); Edith Ugboaja(Trustee); Chukwuemeka Nwakanma(Trustee); Jachimike Ikpeazu(Trustee)
- Website: www.vicarhopefoundation.net

Vicar Hope Foundation(VHF), is a non-governmental organization founded by Mrs. Nkechi Ikpeazu and registered in Nigeria as a not-for-profit. It has a nine-member board of trustees. It was incorporated on 11 November 2015. The Foundation has Special Consultative Status with the United Nations Economic and Social Council(ECOSOC)

Vicar Hope Foundation is involved in health, education, gender based violence, climate and environment, poverty reduction, skills acquisition and development for the indigent, housing for indigent people, welfare, youth and women empowerment. It has headquarters in Umuahia, Abia State, Nigeria where it runs a youth centre and also operates one of its two medical centre that focuses on sickle cell disorder, care for elderly people, maternal and childcare. The second medical and diagnostic centre is located in the city of Aba, Nigeria.

== Programmes of the Foundation ==
=== Health ===
The Foundation runs deworming of school kids in community schools. and promotes sensitization and awareness on preventable diseases as ‘’’diabetes and ‘’’cancer’’’ while its medical centres provides early detection services for breast cancer including screening and examination. Vicar Hope Foundation piloted a collaboration of the State Ministry of Health, Nestle Nutrition Institute of Africa, and Nigeria Society for Neonatal Medicine to train 100 medical personnel drawn from private and public health institutions. Medical doctors, nurses, midwives, community health extension workers and a couple of local birth attendants were amongst persons who benefited from the two-day intensive training course on NEONATAL RESUSCITATION AND ESSENTIAL NEWBORN CARE, a critical intervention procedure applied in the first minute after birth which is critical for helping the baby to start breathing especially where medical facilities are unavailable in rural Africa. The Foundation also support indigent new mothers. The Foundation operates two medical centres that provide care for the elderly, sickle cell disorder and maternal and child care. The Sickle Cell Care department of the Centre apart from disease management and care also offers counselling and outreach services. It is the most functional in a region that has a combined population of about 16 million people. Its location gives it proximity to the rural areas of Abia State, where there is minimal presence of specialized health centres. It also makes it accessible to rural dwellers that form the bulk of people who are most vulnerable to multiple economic and physical effects of sickle cell disease. The Foundation sponsored the passage of a legislation in the State Legislature that seeks to reduce the prevalence of sickle cell disorder.

=== Education ===
The Foundation has constructed classroom blocks and donated school furniture and books to rural communities in Bende Local Government Area and Obingwa Local Government Area. It also delivers scholarships to students through its subsidiary programme, ISLEF.

=== Climate and Environment ===
==== UN Habitat’s Urban Thinkers Campus ====
Working with the Abia State Government, professional and community-based organizations, Vicar Hope Foundation put together an Urban Thinkers Campus, an activity of the UN Habitat’s New Urban Agenda that featured workshops, discussions, and activities in 2017, setting the stage for many engagements between the UN-Habitat and Abia State Government, leading up to concrete actions to tackle key urban challenges such as housing, transportation, environmental sustainability, climate change and social inclusivity in Abia State. The Urban Thinkers Campus is as a platform for individuals, organizations, and stakeholders to come together and discuss urban issues, share ideas, and collaborate on solutions for sustainable urban development and slum recovery.

=== Gender Based Violence ===
VHF GBV Response Programme assists survivors entering the referral pathways to access appropriate health, legal and psycho-social support and services. . This Focal Desk provides support for rapid response to GBV as they occur. Vicar Hope Foundation is also committed to developing strategies and guidelines while collaborating with implementing partners to organize trainings and public awareness programs and enhanced partnership with key stakeholders to curb GBV. Vicar Hope Foundation coordinated a stakeholder movement that led to the introduction of the Abia State Violence Against Persons Prohibition(VAPP) Law. VHF Founder, Nkechi Ikpeazu led a coalition of groups to the State House of Assembly to advocate for its passage

=== Youth and Women Empowerment ===
The Foundation maintains a hub for young people at its headquarters. It also utilizes a programmatic approach to engaging with young people and women, organizing boot camps and workshops that create growth opportunities The organization runs Springboard an initiative to train and empower indigent people with skills and equipment to make them self-reliant. It draws inspiration from “GOAL1” and “GOAL5” of the Sustainable Development Goals. It is funded by Vicar Hope Foundation and partners. Vicar Hope Foundation has at various times distributed empowerment equipment to help rural people start up small businesses.

=== Housing for Indigent ===
The Foundation runs a programme named Widows-Indigent Shelter Scheme (WISS) which has provided homes for over 180 persons as at October 1, 2023.
