= Musah =

Male name

Musah is a male given name and surname:

== Given name ==
- Musah Mohammed (born 2002), Ghanaian footballer
- Musah Nuhu (born 17 January 1997), Ghanaian professional footballer

== Surname ==
- Abdul-Aziz Ayaba Musah, Ghanaian member of parliament
- Ahmed Musah, Ghanaian politician
- Alhassan Musah, Ghanaian politician
- Baba Abdulai Musah (born 18 December 1996), Ghanaian professional footballer
- Kojo Musah (born 15 April 1996), Danish sprinter
- Matbali Musah, Malaysian politician
- Samira Musah, American biomedical engineer and professor
- Suley Musah (born 6 May 1979), retired Ghanaian professional footballer
- Yunus Dimoara Musah (born November 29, 2002), American professional football player

== See also ==
- Musa (name)
