= Khalil Mobasher Kashani =

20th and 21st-century Iranian grand ayatollah

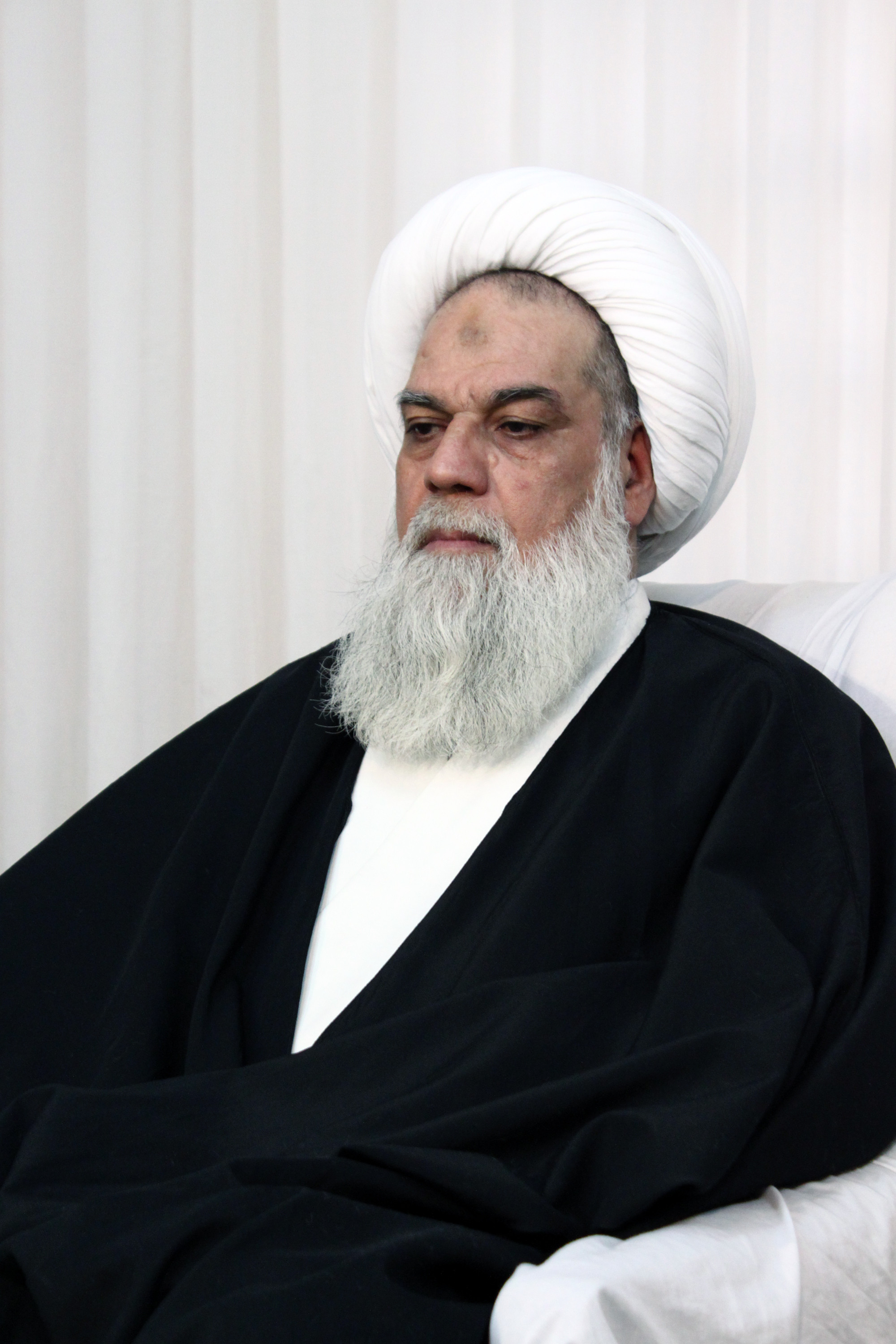
- Grand Ayatollah Khalil Mobasher Kashani
- Title: Grand Ayatollah

Personal life
- Born: 1951 (age 74–75)
- Era: Modern era
- Region: Iran

Religious life
- Religion: Islam
- Jurisprudence: Ja`fari

Grand Ayatollah Khalil Mobasher Kashani (Persian: خلیل مبشر کاشانی) (born 1951) is an Iranian Twelver Shi'a Marja.

He studied in seminaries in Qum, Iran under Grand Ayatollah Mohammad-Reza Golpaygani and Jawad Tabrizi.

== See also ==
- List of maraji
