= Musa Beg =

Armeni-Iranian politician

Musa Beg was an official in late Safavid Iran, who served as controller of the assay (mo'ayyer ol-mamalek) in 1713–14 under Shah Sultan Husayn (r. 1694-1722). He was of Armenian descent, his grandfather having converted to Islam.
