= Mahmud ibn Ali al-Qashani =

Maḥmūd ibn ʿAlī al-Qāshānī (Arabic: محمود بن على بن محمد القاشانى) a Sufi scholar and Islamic author from Kashan, Persia. He died in 735 H.E. / 1335 A.D.

== Works ==
- Lubab al-Qut Min Khaza'in al-Malakut, completed in 1320s.
- Sharh Ta'iyah ibn al-Farid (The commentary on Ibn Farid's poem "Ta'iyah")
- Sharh al-Khamariyah (The commentary on Ibn Farid's poem "al-Khamariyah")
- Misbah al-Hidayah wa Miftah al-Kifayah
