= Musa Halilu Ahmed =

Nigerian businessman

Musa Halilu-Ahmed
- Born: May 13, 1976 (age 50); Gembu (Mambila Plateau), Adamawa, Nigeria
- Education: Yelwa Government Secondary School; Kaduna Polytechnic
- Occupations: Politician, business tycoon
- Spouse: Hajiya Amina Musa Halilu

Musa Halilu-Ahmed OFR, also known as Dujima or Musa Yola (born May 13, 1976), is a Nigerian businessman and politician. He is the Dujuma of Adamawa State, a highly revered traditional title that dates back to the old Borno Empire during the 18th century in Nigeria. He is the Chairman of TILT Group, a multinational conglomerate headquartered in Nigeria with diversified investments spanning key business sectors of the African economy, including energy, construction, engineering, agriculture, and technology.

== Early life and education ==
Musa was born in the ancient city of Gembu (Mambila Plateau) located in former Gongola State (later divided into Adamawa and Taraba states) to Alhaji Halilu Ahmadu Chiroma and Mama Hauwa Halilu. As a child born into a devout Muslim family, Musa started his early Qur’anic education at the age of four and was later enrolled at Musdafa primary school in Yola between 1983 and 1988.

After completing his primary school education, he proceeded to Yelwa Government Secondary School in Yola for his secondary school education, which he completed in 1994. Shortly afterwards, he gained admission into Kaduna Polytechnic where he studied for an Ordinary National Diploma (OND) degree in Management Studies between 1999 and 2001.

In 2005, he successfully completed his Higher National Diploma (HND) program from Kaduna Polytechnic the same institution he received his OND. In accordance with the mandatory one-year National Youth Service Corps (NYSC) scheme for all Nigerian graduates, Musa participated in the NYSC in 2006. Striving to get the best out of the NYSC year, Musa studied for a Diploma in Information Communication Technology at the National Institute of Technology.

== Career ==
Presently, Musa holds the position of Chairman at TILT Group and occupies board seats in multiple companies spanning diverse industries. His involvement encompasses Construction, Real Estate, Energy, Agriculture, Technology, Supply Chain Management, and Venture Capital.

== Politics ==
Musa has played roles and served in various capacities in different key political parties in Nigeria over the course of the last two decades. He has been involved in various stages of the evolution, growth and survival of several notable political parties they include: The All Nigerians Peoples Party (ANPP), Congress for Progressive Change (CPC), and the All Progressives Congress (APC).

He played an active role in the build-up towards the 2015 Presidential election in Nigeria. Musa was involved in different strategic areas where he contested for the post of National Delegate and emerged successful, a convention that saw the historic rise of President Muhammadu Buhari as the then Presidential candidate of the APC. In spite of contributing immensely to the triumph of the ruling political party APC at the 2015 Presidential election, Musa took a back seat in the political space and went back to his flourishing business realm in the private sector.

In May 2018, Musa served as the chairman of the All Progressives Congress Ward Congress Committee for Oyo State. He led a seven-man committee sent from the capital city Abuja to midwife the congress held across the 351 wards in Oyo State

== Honours ==
On March 31, 2018 Musa Halilu-Ahmed was officially conferred and turbaned as the Dujima of Adamawa state by the Lamido of Adamawa, His Royal Highness Muhammadu Barkindo Aliyu Musdafa. The traditional title is bequeathed to philanthropists who have demonstrated exceptional leadership in civic and charitable responsibility.
