= Musa Isiyaku Ahmed =

Nigerian academic

- Born: Borno State
- Citizenship: Nigerian
- Occupation: Lecturer

Musa Isiyaku Ahmed is a Nigerian academic. He is the first and current vice-chancellor of Federal University of Agriculture, Zuru in Kebbi State. Prof. Ahmed is Fellow College of Veterinary Surgeons Nigeria, Fellow Institute of Human and Natural Resources, Affiliate member Computer Professional Council (CPN), Nigeria Computer Society (NCS) and member, Academia in Information Technology Professionals (AITP). Prof Ahmed hails from Borno State in Nigeria. He was formerly Professor in the Department of Veterinary, Parasitology and Entomology at the University of Maiduguri in Borno State.
