= Musa Khawula =

South African blogger and social media personality

- Born: 1991 (age 34–35); South Africa
- Occupations: Social media personality, blogger
- Years active: 2010s–present
- Known for: Celebrity gossip commentary and online entertainment reporting

Musa Khawula (born 1991) is a South African social media personality and entertainment blogger who publishes celebrity gossip, social commentary, and entertainment industry updates, primarily on the platform X (formerly Twitter). He gained public recognition through his rapid reporting style and outspoken commentary on public figures, and more recently, being mentioned by Witness F at the Madlanga Commission.

== Legal issues and arrest ==
In March 2023 Khawula was arrested for stabbing and killing Wandile Khambule in quarrel outside the deceased's home. Khawula later claimed it was in self-defense and that he was in a relationship with Khambule.

Khawula has faced several legal challenges linked to statements published on social media platforms. In January 2025, he was arrested in Dundee, KwaZulu-Natal after a warrant was issued in connection with charges under the Cybercrimes Act 19 of 2020, as well as charges of crimen injuria and hate speech.

The charges related to social media posts concerning businessman Zee Nxumalo, his spouse, as well as the ANC secretary, Fikile Mbalula, which prosecutors alleged impaired the complainant's dignity.

In separate civil proceedings, the Johannesburg High Court ruled that certain statements published by Khawula about political and business figures were unlawful and ordered damages to be paid.

== Madlanga Commission ==
Khawula's arrest was later discussed during testimony before the Madlanga Commission, which was established to investigate allegations of corruption, criminal networks, and political interference within South Africa's law-enforcement structures.

During proceedings, a protected witness referred to as Witness F alleged that police deputy minister Cassel Mathale and deputy national police commissioner Gen Shadrack Sibiya were put under political pressure to arrest Khawula following social media posts he made accusing Fikile Mbalula, Cat Matlala, Zee Nxumalo and business figures of corruption. The individuals named in these allegations denied wrongdoing.

The commission also heard testimony that a police arrest warrant for Khawula had been shared with alleged organised-crime figure Vusimuzi “Cat” Matlala, reportedly in an attempt to assist authorities in locating him. The matter raised concerns regarding the handling of confidential police documentation.

Additional testimony alleged that law-enforcement officials had contacted Khawula directly and asked him to stop publishing allegations relating to Matlala and associated individuals.

== See also ==
- Digital journalism
- South African Police Service
