= Musa Ndusha =

Congolese footballer (born 1994)

Personal information
- Full name: Tchitchi Musa Ndusha
- Date of birth: 12 August 1994 (age 32)
- Place of birth: Goma, Zaire
- Position: Midfielder

Youth career
- 2012–2014: DC Virunga

Senior career*
Years	Team	Apps	(Gls)
2014–2016	Renaissance	33	(9)
2016–2017	Simba	31	(7)
2017	Buildcon	19	(7)
2018	Slutsk	24	(0)
2020–2021	Bukavu Dawa		
2021–2023	Bumamuru		
2023–2024	Vita Club		

International career
2013	DR Congo U20	1	(0)
- * Club domestic league appearances and goals as of 3 December 2024

Musa Tchitchi Ndusha (born 12 August 1994) or known as Chichi Musa, is a Congolese professional footballer who plays as a midfielder for Vita Club. He has played in Renaissance in Congo, Simba in Tanzania, Buildcon in Zambia, Slutsk in Belarus.

== Career ==
=== Simba ===
In July 2016, Ndusha joined Simba from Renaissance. However it took some long time without featuring for Simba due to the claims which arose from Renaissance indicating that Ndusha was still contracted with them however Simba decided to open a FIFA trial, leaving the scenes to show the player has no contract with the Renaissance at the end FIFA allowed him to play for Simba He made his debut for Simba on 8 August 2016 against AFC Leopards in a friendly match played in National Stadium Dar es Salaam, Simba won 4–0. In December 2016, Simba released Ndusha.

=== Buildcon F.C ===
In 2017, Ndusha joined Buildcon. On 29 March 2017, he made his debut for Buildcon against TP Mazembe. The match ended 0-0.

=== Slutsk ===
He joined Slutsk in 2018 and making his debut against FC Gomel on 31 March 2018 at Stadyen im. Alexander Prokopenko (Babruysk (Bobruisk))
