= Wijdan Al-Sayegh =

Iraqi writer and poet

Wijdan Alsayegh
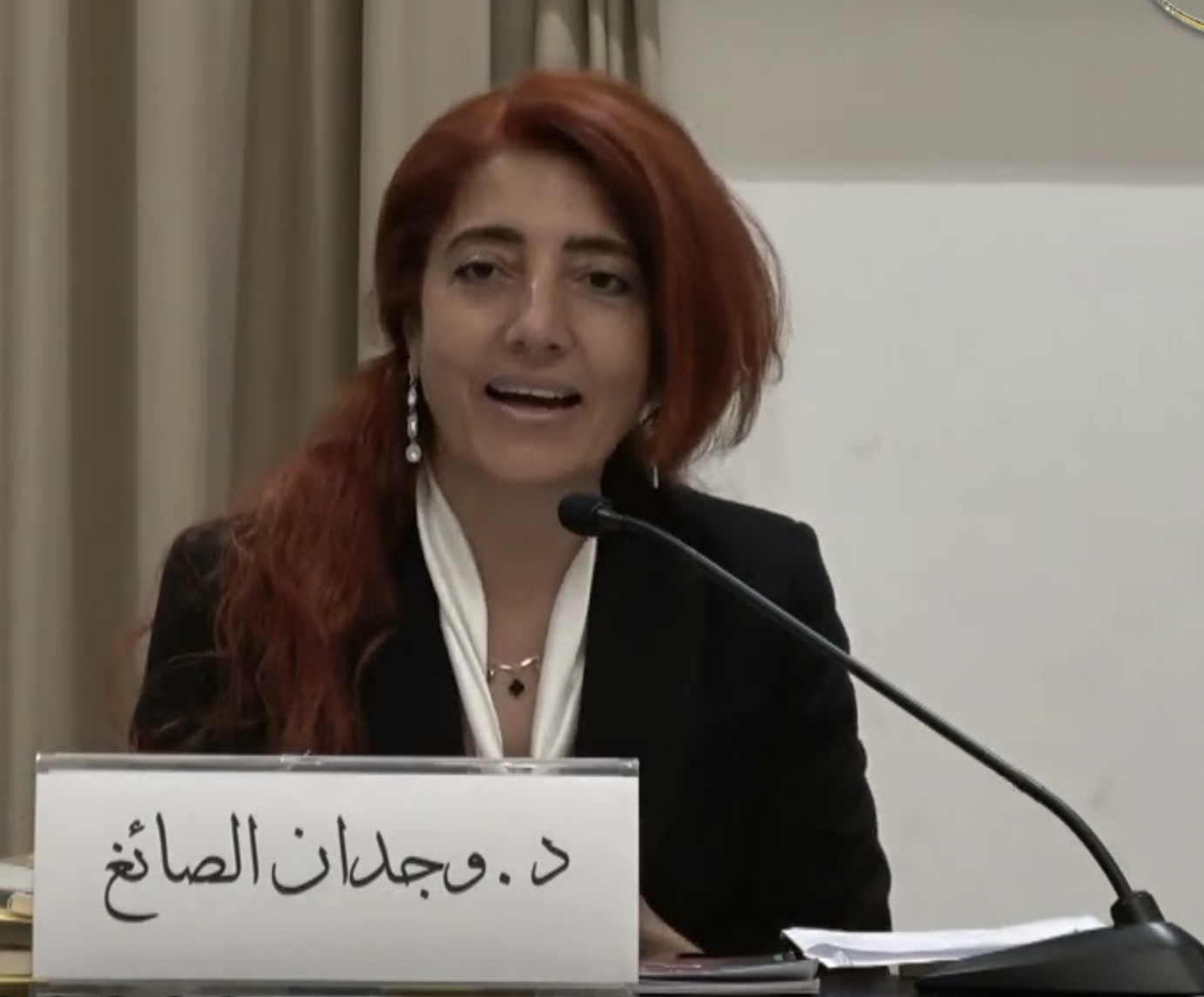
- Born: 1967 (age 57–58); Baghdad, Iraq
- Education: University of Mosul (MA 1992, PhD 1995)
- Awards: Laureate of Women's Literary Creation, Sharjah, November 1998; Al-Afif Cultural Award for Literature, Sana'a, April 2003

Wijdan Alsayegh (Arabic: وجدان الصائغ) is an Iraqi writer, poet, and critic born in Baghdad in 1967. She earned a master's degree with a grade of excellence in 1992 from University of Mosul on her thesis (the Rhetorical image in the poetry of Omar Abu Risha). Local and Arabic magazines have published tens of her poetry and studies and she is currently the managing editor of the New Poetry Magazine – Middle Eastern studies department in Michigan, United States. Wijdan Alsayegh is the president of the Arab American Poetry House Association.

== Early life ==
The Iraqi poet, writer, and critic Wijdan Al-Sayegh was born in Baghdad in 1967. She earned a master's degree with a grade of excellence in 1992 from University of Mosul on her thesis (the Rhetorical image in the poetry of Omar Abu Risha). She also earned a doctorate degree from the same university in rhetorical criticism in 1995 on her dissertation (Imagery in the poetry of al-Akhtal al-Saghir). She also earned a diploma in media studies in 2001 from the University of Colorado in the United States. Al-Sayegh started teaching in 1992 and supervised numerous M.A theses of which the last were Character Portrayal in Muhammed al-Shurafi's Literature, Heritage in the Poetry of Hassan al-Sharafi, and the Poetry of Umara al-Yamani: A Stylistic Reading, College of Arts, Thamar University, 2005–2006. Arabic and local magazines published tens of her poems and studies, and she is currently the managing editor of the New Poetry Magazine and the Arabic Journal – middle eastern studies department in Michigan, United States. She was a member of the evaluative committee of the President of Yemen's Prize for Poetry for the years 2004, 2005, and 2006 and a member of the Al Owais Cultural Award for Poetry committee in the years 2015 and 2016.

== Works ==
- The Rhetorical Image in the Poetry of Omar Abu Risha, Dar al-Hayat, 1997.
- The Rhetorical Image in Feminist Texts from the United Arab Emirates, the Egyptian-Lebanese Corporation, 1999
- The Sparkle of Creation and the Hearth of Disclosure: Readings in Contemporary Texts, Ubadi Foundation for Studies and Publication, Sana’a, 2001
- The Lotus Flower: Readings in the Poeticism of Ali Abdullah Khalifa, Dar El Ilm Lilmalayin, 2002
- The Rhetorical Image in Modern Arabic Poetry, Arab Foundation for Studies and Publication, Beirut, 2003
- The Throne and the Hoopoe: Exegetical Analogies of Images in Yemeni Poetic Discourse, Al-Afif Foundation, Sana’a, 2003
- Feminist Scriptures: Readings in Feminist Texts, Union of Yemeni Writers, Sana’a, 2003
- The Female and the Mirrors of the Text: Arabic Feminist Literature, Ninawa House, Damascus, 2004
- Poets from Dilmun, Ministry of Culture, Sana’a, 2004
- The Poem and the Interpretative Space, Ministry of Culture, Sana’a, 2004
- The Feminist Arabic Poem: Reading through the Disciplines, Ministry of Culture, Sana’a, 2005
- Arabic Feminist Narrative: Reading through the Disciplines, Ubadi Foundation, Sana’a, 2006
- The Carbuncle Rose: The Formation of Misery in the Contemporary Poem, Ubadi Foundation, 2006
- The Swallow and the Spring: Readings in Yemeni Poetry, Dhamar University Press, Dhamar, 2006
- Pearl Necklaces: Readings in the Contemporary Poem, Aden University Press, Aden, 2006

== Awards ==
- Laureate of Women's Literary Creation, Sharjah, November 1998, for her book the Rhetorical Image in Feminist Texts from the United Arab Emirates
- Al-Afif Cultural Award for Literature, Sana’a, April 2003, for her book the Throne and the Hoopoe: Exegetical Analogies of Images in Yemeni Poetic Discourse
- Her book The Lotus Flower was selected for distribution at the Bahraini Cultural Forum in its new location, January, 2002
- She got awarded the Testimonial Plaque of the Mu’assasat al-Muthaqqaf al-‘Arabi for her career as a critic, Cairo, 2004
