= Gasimbey Mosque =

Mosque in Baku, Azerbaijan

- Azerbaijani: Qasımbəy Məscidi
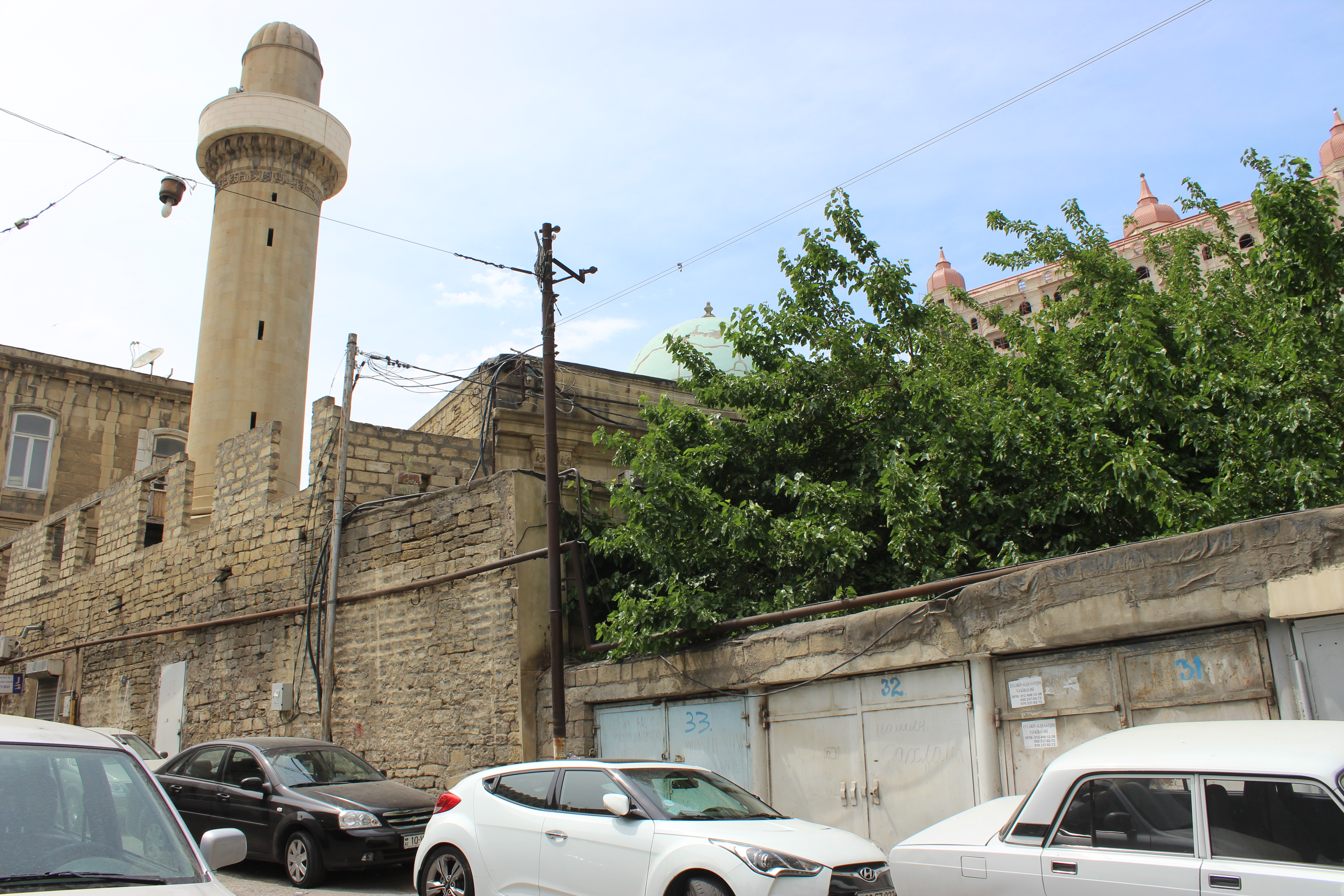
- The mosque in 2017

- Location of the mosque in Baku

Religion
- Affiliation: Islam
- Ecclesiastical or organisational status: Mosque (1896–1928); Profane use (1928–1992); Mosque (since 1992)
- Status: Active

Location
- Location: 23 Hazı Aslanov Street, Baku, Yasamal raion
- Country: Azerbaijan
- Coordinates: 40°22′21″N 49°49′57″E

Architecture
- Type: Mosque architecture
- Groundbreaking: 1892
- Completed: 1896

Specifications
- Interior area: 250 m^{2} (2,700 sq ft)
- Dome: One
- Dome dia. (outer): 6.0 m (19.7 ft)
- Minaret: One
- Minaret height: 31 m (102 ft)
- Site area: 330 m^{2} (3,600 sq ft)
- Inscriptions: Many

The Gasimbey Mosque is a mosque and historical architectural monument, located in the city of Baku, Azerbaijan.

Completed in 1896, the mosque was included in the list of local significant immovable historical and cultural monuments by decision No. 132 of the Cabinet of Ministers of the Republic of Azerbaijan on August 2, 2001.

Abandoned during Soviet occupation, after Azerbaijan regained its independence, the building resumed its purpose as a mosque.

== About ==
The Gasimbey Mosque was constructed in Baku between 1892 and 1896. It is located at 23 Hazı Aslanov Street in the Yasamal district. The architect of the mosque is Mashadi Mirza Ghafar Ismayilov, and it was commissioned by Gasım bey.

Following the Soviet occupation, official anti-religious campaigns began in 1928. In December of the same year, the Central Committee of the Communist Party of Azerbaijan transferred many mosques, churches, and synagogues to the balance of educational clubs for secular purposes. If there were approximately 3,000 mosques in Azerbaijan in 1917, by 1927, the number decreased to 1,700, and by 1933, it was reduced to 17.

After Azerbaijan regained its independence, the mosque was included in the list of local significant immovable historical and cultural monuments by decision No. 132 of the Cabinet of Ministers of the Republic of Azerbaijan on August 2, 2001. It resumed its activities in 1992. Currently, the Gasimbey Jumu'ah Mosque, registered with the state, operates as a religious community.

== Architecture ==
The total area of the mosque is 330 m^{2} (3,600 sq ft), with an interior area of 250 m^{2} (2,700 sq ft). It features a minaret that is 31 m (102 ft) tall. The lower part of the minaret is rectangular with a width of 2.5 m (8 ft 2 in) and a height of 6.0 m (19.7 ft). The minaret is constructed with oriented stones, and the lower section is adorned with triple-arched stalactites. Arabic script Quranic verses are inscribed on the lower part, and the minaret is crowned with a metal dome.

On the left side of the main entrance door of the mosque, there are five window openings shaped like mihrabs (prayer niches) in the wall. These windows are made of wood and are 3.0 m (9.8 ft) in height. An alcove above the entrance door of the main prayer hall is intended for women. There is a wooden platform for entry into the prayer hall.

The prayer hall is supported by four large columns, each with a diameter of 1.0 m (3 ft 3 in), made of solid stone blocks connected by twelve ornamental bricks. The diameter of the dome is 6.0 m (19.7 ft), and it contains eight rectangular windows.

Both the dome and the bricks are adorned with intricate geometric and floral patterns. Circular Arabic script "Shahada" is carved on the joint part of the dome and the bricks. This inscription is repeated seven times. The mihrab is located in the central part of the mosque, with the "Jumu'ah" chapter inscribed on three sides of it.

== See also ==
- Islam in Azerbaijan
- List of mosques in Azerbaijan
- List of mosques in Baku
