= Musa Najafi =

Institute for Humanities and Cultural Studies of Iran

Personal details
- Born: 1962 (age 63–64) Isfahan, Iran
- Education: PhD in political science
- Alma mater: Institute for Humanities and Cultural Studies
- Occupation: Head of the Research Institute of Culture and Islamic Revolution Civilization; Head of the Group of Islamic Revolution Theorizing; Founder of the House of constitutional theory (Isfahan)
- Profession: Professor, researcher, historian

Musa Najafi (Persian: موسی نجفی, born 1962 in Isfahan) is an Iranian professor, historian, and author. He is the director of the Department of Political Thought and Philosophy at Islamic Azad University and directs the Ph.D. group in political science at Imam Khomeini Educational Research Institute, with a focus on issues in Iran. Najafi also heads the Research Institute of Culture and Islamic Civilization and Revolution, where he is head of the Department of Islamic Revolution Theory. Najafi is a former faculty member of the Department of the Political science at Tehran University.

He presented and debated with a committee a theory of the evolution and the formation of the national identity of Iran, considering the period from pre-Islamic times until today. Najafi won an Iranian Book of the Year Award for Levels of Political Philosophy in Islamic Civilization, which was recognized by Iran's Secretariat of Islamic Scholars in 2003.

== Education ==
Najafi holds a bachelor's and master's degree in political science from Tehran University and a Ph.D. in political science from Iran's Institute for Humanities and Cultural Studies. His Ph.D. thesis was titled "Levels of Political Philosophy in the Context of the Rise of Islamic Culture and Civilization", advised by Reza Davari Ardakani.

== Bibliography ==
- Ta ammulat-i siyasi dar tarikh-i tafakkur-i Islami
- Andishah-`i siyasi va tarikh-i nahzat-i Hajj-i Aqa
- Muqaddimah-i tahilili-i tarikh-i tahavvulat-i siyasi-i
- Andishah-i dini va sikularism
- Ta`mulat-i siyasi dar tarikh-i tafakkur-i Islami
- Mutun mabani va takvin: andishah- i tahrim dar tarikh-i
- Mutun, mabani, takvin: Andishah-i tahrim dar tarikh-i siyasi-i Iran : tahqiq piramun-i mutun, fatavi, madarik-i tarikhi-i andishah-i tahrim ya muqavamat-i manfi dar yak qarn tarikh-i siyasi-i Iran
- Andishah-i siyasi va tarikh-i nihzat-i bidargaranah-i Nur Allah Isfahani
- Hawzah-i Najaf va falsafah-i tajaddud dar Iran (Gharbshinasi)
- Tarikh-i tahavvulat-i siyasi-i Iran
- Ta°amul-i diyanat va siyasat dar Iran (Gharbshinasi, gharbgirayi va gharbsitizi-i Iraniyan)
- Andishah-i siyasi va tarikh-i nahzat-i Hajj Nur Allah Isfahani (Zu°ama-yi mashrutiyat)
- Maratib-i Zuhur-i falsafah-i siyasat dar tamaddun-i Islami
- Muqaddimah-i tahlili-i tarikh-i tahavvulat-i siyasi-i Iran: Din, dawlat, tajaddud : takvin-i huviyat-i milli-i nuvin-i Iran az °asr-i Safaviyah ta dawran-i mu°asir
- Andishah-i dini va sikularism dar hawzah-i ma°rifat-i siyasi va gharbshinasi: Dahahha-yi nukhustin yaksad sal-i akhir-i Iran
