= Musa Mante Baraza =

Nigerian politician

State Representative
- Constituency: Dass

Personal details
- Died: 2020
- Occupation: Politician

Musa Mante Baraza was a Nigerian politician and a member of the Bauchi State House of Assembly, where he represented the Dass constituency. He died in August 2020. At the time of his death, he was recuperating from COVID-19 in his village, Baraza, when he was tragically killed by unknown gunmen.
