= Musa Adam Maihula =

Musa Adam Maihula (known as Sheikh Musa Adam Maihula) is a Nigerian Islamic cleric. He is the Chief Iman of Umar bin Khaddab Mosque in Gombe. Maihula is recognized as one of the Salafi preachers in the northeastern Nigeria.

== Early life and education ==
Maihula started his Islamic studies in Numan, Adamawa State before his parents moved to Gombe, where he completed his secondary school education.

He often cited Sheikh Muhammad Auwal Adam Albani as his scholar, who taught him Hadith and Aqeedah.

== Mosque leadership ==
Maihula serves as Chief Imam of Masjid Umar bin Khaddab, located in Federal Low-cost Gombe. He conducts Friday sermons and annual Tafseer sessions.

== Public dissemination ==
His audio lectures, sermons and Quranic commentaries are distributed through online platforms.

== Civic engagement ==
Maihula was appointed by Gombe State Governor, Muhammadu Inuwa Yahaya, to serve on the state's 2023-2024 Quran Recitation Competition.

He is an advocate for media literacy and information verification. During an anti-misinformation workshop organized by the fact-checking organization Alkalanci, Maihula urged fellow religious leaders to verify information rigorously before delivering sermons.
