= Musa Trabulsi =

Arab Orthodox scholar

Musa al-Trabulsi (scholarly: Mūsā Ṭrābulsī; c. 1710 – c. 1790) was an 18th-century Arab Orthodox secretary, grammarian, translator and man of letters associated with Patriarch Sylvester of Antioch. He is especially known for the corpus of correspondence preserved under his name, which sheds light on the administration, literary culture and confessional debates of the Patriarchate of Antioch in the Ottoman period.

Mūsā belonged to the Nawfal family of Tripoli and is identified in manuscript evidence as Ibn al-Naḥū al-Ṭrābulsī. His mother, Maryam, was the sister of Ilyās Fakhr, the logothete of the Patriarchate of Antioch, making Mūsā a nephew of Fakhr. The dates of his birth and death are not directly recorded, but modern reconstruction places his life approximately between 1710 and 1790. This estimate is based on his appointment as patriarchal secretary in 1732, the latest dated letter in his collection from 1787, and a 1791 ownership note referring to him as deceased.

In 1732, after Sylvester returned to Damascus, Mūsā entered his service as secretary. In this role, he drafted letters on behalf of the patriarch, taught Arabic to Orthodox boys preparing for clerical life, and accompanied Sylvester on pastoral and fund-raising journeys across the patriarchate, including travel through Anatolia and eastern Ottoman territories such as Erzurum and Diyarbakır. His correspondence also shows him to have been active in Damascus, Beirut and other centers of Orthodox literary and ecclesiastical life.

Mūsā was trained in Arabic grammar and literature and had a strong command of Ottoman Turkish. This multilingual competence made him valuable not only as a secretary but also as a translator and teacher in a multilingual Ottoman Christian environment. In the 1750s he was involved in the Orthodox press in Beirut and may have overseen some of its operations alongside Yūsuf Mark. After Sylvester’s death in 1766, he remained a respected elder in Damascus and continued to participate in ecclesiastical correspondence, manuscript endowment and the supervision of younger clerics.

== Works ==
Mūsā is associated with two authored works and at least one major translation. These include Risāla ʿabqarīya, written in the context of anti-Catholic controversy; Baʿḍ dībājāt wa murāsalāt li-ajl manfaʿat ṭālibīhim, a collection of model letters connected with Arabic epistolography; and an Arabic translation of the Ottoman Turkish version of Judasz Tadeusz Krusiński’s Tārīkh al-suyyāḥ. His literary activity also included proofreading, copying and assisting in the circulation of polemical Orthodox texts together with figures such as Ilyās Fakhr, Sophronios of Kilis and Yūsuf Mark.

== Historical significance ==
Mūsā’s main importance lies in the corpus of correspondence associated with him, which constitutes one of the most important surviving documentary collections for the 18th-century Antiochian Orthodox Patriarchate. Through these letters, historians have reconstructed networks of secretaries, translators, teachers, printers and clergy who shaped Orthodox intellectual and ecclesiastical life in Ottoman Syria and beyond. Musa Trabulsi has also been researched by the TYPARABIC project team (AdG 2019 - Horizon 2020 - Contract no. 883219).

== Sources ==
- Ibrahim, Habib (15 December 2025). The Correspondence of Mūsā Ṭrābulsī (1732–1787): Critical Edition, English Translation, and Introduction. Berlin/Boston: De Gruyter. doi:10.1515/9783111649276. ISBN 978-3-11-164223-9. OCLC 1545081162.
- Feodorov, Ioana (2023). Arabic Printing for the Christians in Ottoman Lands: The East-European Connection. Berlin/Boston: De Gruyter. doi:10.1515/9783110786996. ISBN 978-3-11-078684-2. OCLC 1408682807.
- Haddad, Rachid (2006). "La correspondance de Ṭrābulsī, secrétaire du patriarche d'Antioche Sylvestre de Chypre". In Canivet, Pierre; Rey-Coquais, Jean-Paul (eds.). Mémorial Monseigneur Joseph Nasrallah. Damascus: Institut français de Damas. pp. 257–288.
- Al-Mṭīrī, Falāḥ Zayd Thwīnī (2019). Kitāb Mir’āt al-ʻibra fī ʻajā’ib al-qudra li-Mūsā bin Jirjis Abī Nawfal al-Naḥawī al-Ṭrābulsī (Master's thesis). Jordan: Jāmiʻat al-Bayt.
- Sabev, Orlin (2025). The Müteferrika Press: Arabic Typography in an Ottoman Context. Berlin/Boston: De Gruyter. doi:10.1515/9783111386621. ISBN 978-3-11-138662-1. OCLC 1513138836.
