= Musa Khan Kashi =

Iranian traditional musician

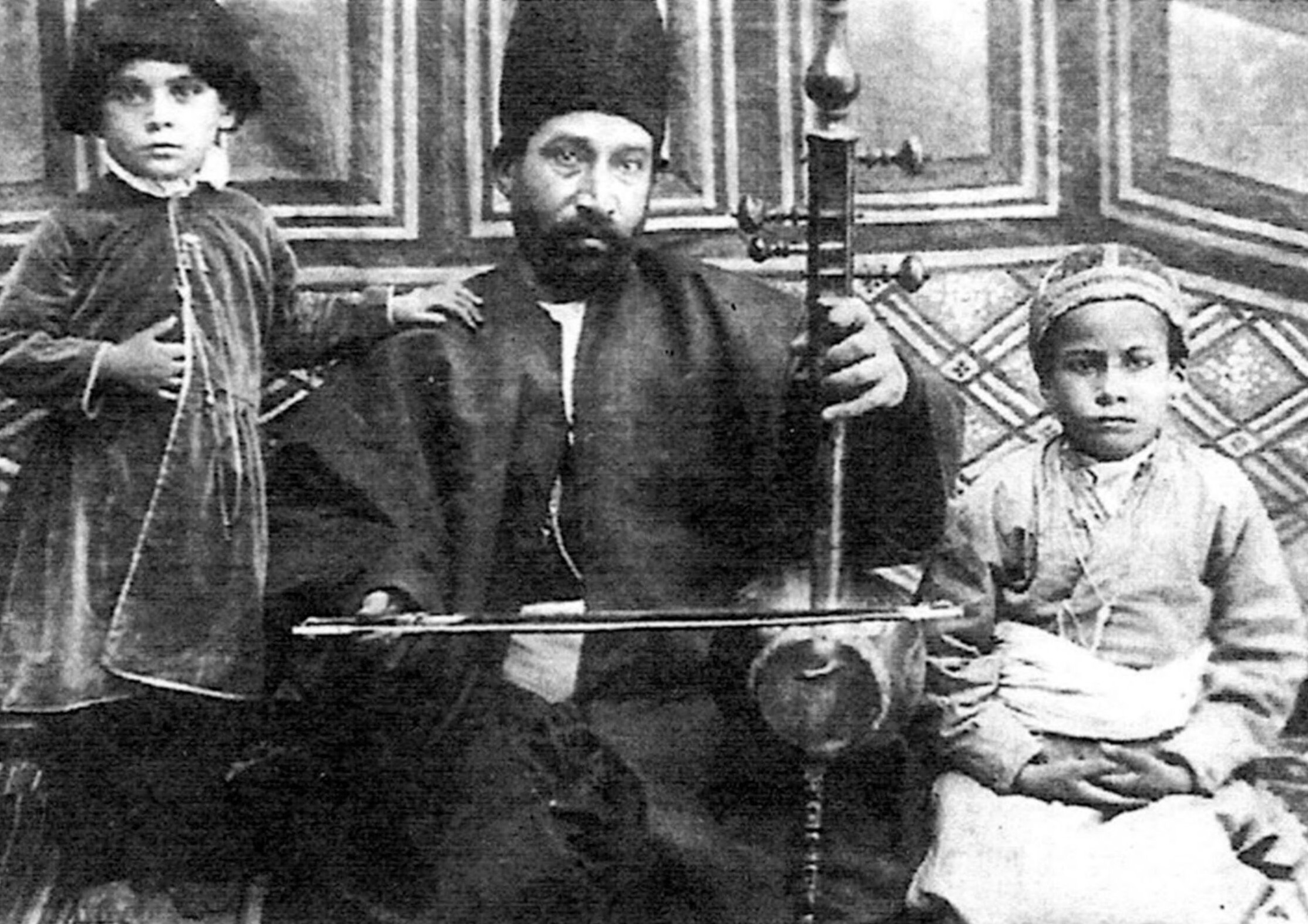
- Musa Khan Kashi with his children, Eshaq (left) and Khalil (right). Taken in Kashan, dated c. 1897
- Born: 1856; Kashan, Qajar Iran
- Died: 1939 (aged 82–83); Kashan, Pahlavi Iran
- Occupations: Musician, kamancheh player
- Known for: Inventing the six-stringed kamancheh
- Children: Musa Khanzadeh

Musa Khan Kashi (Persian: موسی خان کاشی; 1856–1939) was an Iranian Jewish musician of Persian traditional music and kamancheh player.

Musa Khan was born in Kashan, which at the time had many Jewish residents, including several musicians. For almost twenty years, he worked in the court of Mass'oud Mirza Zell-e Soltan, the governor of Isfahan. It was the latter that rewarded Musa Khan with the title of "Khan". In Isfahan, Musa Khan became the teacher of Baqer Khan Rameshgar, who would later become one of the greatest kamancheh players of the 20th century.

Musa Khan later worked in the court of Jalal ol-Dowleh Qajar, the governor of Yazd. There Musa Khan quickly helped end the forced requirement for the local Jews to wear identifying patches through his close ties to Jalal ol-Dowleh. Later, at the invitation of Naser al-Din Shah Qajar (r. 1848–1896), Musa Khan played in the court of Tehran.

Traditionally, kamanchehs had three strings, and Musa Khan became renowned for using a six-stringed version. Although Baqer Khan used a six-stringed kamancheh, this variant was abandoned by later kamancheh players. From the middle of the 19th century and onwards, kamanchehs started to be used with fourth strings.

Musa Khan died in 1939 in Kashan. His son Musa Khanzadeh was also a prominent musician.

== Sources ==
- Sarshar, Houman (2009). "Judeo-Persian Communities xi. Music (2)". In Yarshater, Ehsan (ed.). Encyclopædia Iranica (Online ed.). Encyclopædia Iranica Foundation. ISBN 978-1934283325.
- Sarshar, Houman (2012). "Kāši, Musā Khan". In Yarshater, Ehsan (ed.). Encyclopædia Iranica (Online ed.). Encyclopædia Iranica Foundation. ISBN 978-1934283332.
