= Obingwa =

Coordinates: 5.1554°N 7.4571°E

Obingwa Obiomangwa
- LGA
- Interactive map of Obingwa
- Country: Nigeria
- State: Abia State
- Capital: Mgboko

Government
  - Type: Democratic

Area
  - Total: 395 km^{2} (153 sq mi)

Population (2006)
  - Total: 181,894
  - Density: 460/km^{2} (1,190/sq mi)
- Time zone: UTC+1 (WAT)
- Postal code: 453

Obingwa is a Local Government Area of Abia State, Nigeria. Its headquarters are in the town of Mgboko.

It has an area of 395 km^{2} and a population of 181,439 at the 2006 census.

The postal code of the area is 453.

== Geography ==
The average annual temperature in Obingwa LGA is 27 degrees Celsius (80 degrees Fahrenheit), and it has a total size of 395 square kilometres (153 square miles). The wet season and the dry season each have their own separate seasons in the LGA. Obingwa LGA is reported to have an average humidity level of 60%.

== Economy ==
The Obingwa LGA's economy is heavily reliant on trade, and the region is home to various markets where a wide range of goods are bought and sold, including the Ehere Modern market. With crops including yam, cassava, cocoyam, and vegetables cultivated in huge quantities in the area, farming is another important aspect of the economic activities carried out by the residents of Obingwa LGA.

== Populated areas ==
- Mgboko
- Abayi Okoroato
- Abala-Ibeme
- Mgboko Ngwa
- Ohanze
- Owoelu
- Ndiakata
- Nlagu
- Oberete
- Umuoha
- Obete-Ukwu
- Onicha-Ngwa
- Umuiroma
- Akpaa Mba-ato
- Ovom Ama-Asaa
- Ovom 1

== See also ==
- List of villages in Abia State
