= Musa Hacigasimov =

Architect and politician from Azerbaijan

Musa bey Mirzə Həmdulla bey oglu Hacigasimov (Azerbaijani:Musa Hacıqasımov; August 16, 1886, Qasimkend, Dagestan, Russian Empire - July 20, 1935, Leningrad, Soviet Union) was an Azerbaijani architect and politician who held positions in the Azerbaijani Soviet Socialist Republic (1925-1930) and Leningrad (1933-1935).
