= Musa Kraja =

Albanian educational theorist (1938–2017)

Musa Kraja (3 October 1938 in Shkodër – 13 June 2017 in Tirana) was a notable figure in Albanian education. He was an educator, doctor of pedagogical sciences, university professor, and an author of pedagogical works and biographical monographs. His contributions were recognized with the title of "Distinguished Teacher" (Mësues i Merituar).

== Biography ==
Born on 3 October 1938, in Shkodër, Albania, Musa Kraja received his early education and pedagogical training in his hometown. He pursued higher studies in language and literature (1966) and history-geography (1968) at the Higher Pedagogical Institute in Shkodër. Later, he completed his university studies in history-geography at the Faculty of History and Philology, University of Tirana (1970). His academic journey continued with postgraduate studies in philosophy, and he earned various scientific degrees: candidate of pedagogical sciences (1984), docent (1986), doctor of pedagogical sciences (1993), assistant professor (1994), and university professor (2000). Musa Kraja also conducted research abroad, including in Switzerland and Turkey.

== Publications ==
- Portrete mësuesish dëshmorë (Portraits of Fallen Teachers), 1967 OCLC 7577636
- Migjeni Mësues (Migjeni the Teacher), 1973
- Ndrec Ndue Gjoka, 1974
- Për forcimin e punës edukative në shkollë (Strengthening Educational Work in Schools), 1981
- Mësuesi në kohën e Partisë (Teacher during the Party Era), 1986 OCLC 466801420
- Probleme shoqërore pedagogjike (Social-Pedagogical Issues), 1986
- Mati Logoreci: Jeta dhe puna (Mati Logoreci: Life and Work), 2001 OCLC 163224558
- Pedagogjia (Pedagogy), 1998, 2002 OCLC 474112925
- Idetë dhe veprimtaria pedagogjike e Harry T. Fultzit ne Shqipëri (The Pedagogical Ideas and Activity of Harry T. Fultz in Albania), 2000 OCLC 1220902197
- Vizione pedagogjike për zonat rurale (Pedagogical Visions for Rural Areas), 2003
- Bijë të Lunxhërisë për arsimin shqiptar (The sons of Lunxhëria for Albanian Education), 2002 OCLC 163382713
- Pedagogjia e zbatuar (Applied Pedagogy), 2008

== See also ==
- Education in Albania
